= List of birds of Kentucky =

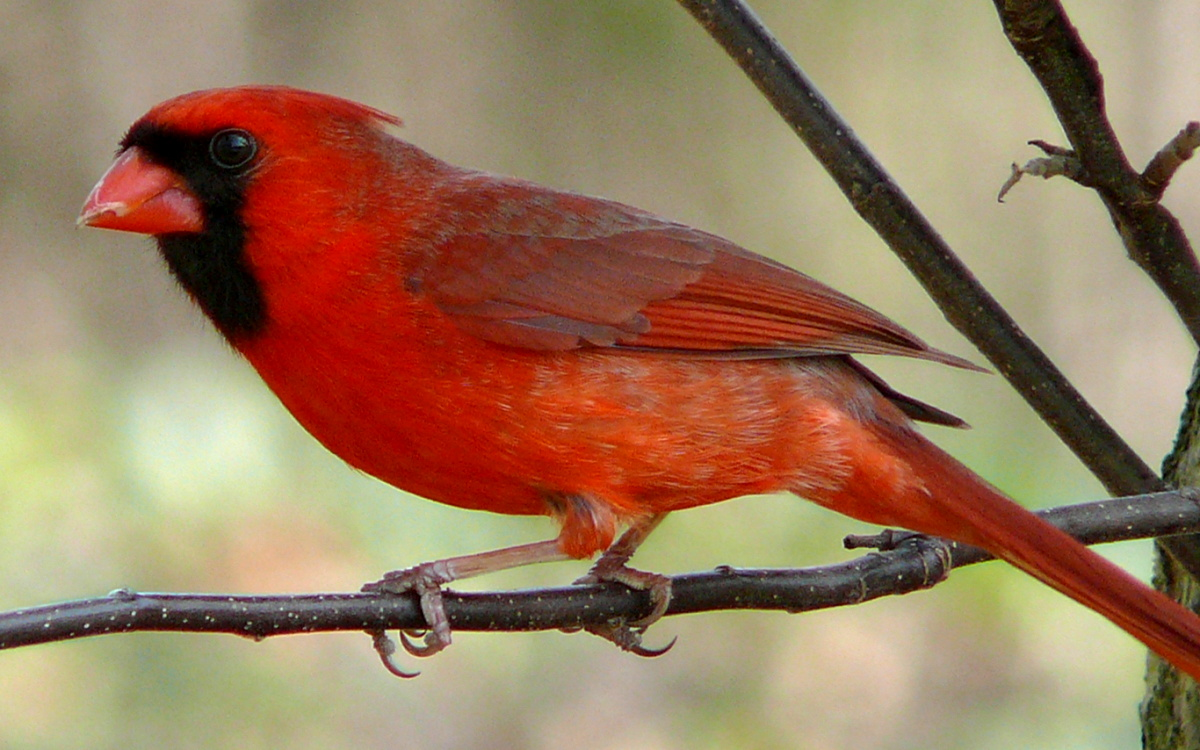
The northern cardinal is the state bird of Kentucky.

This list of birds of Kentucky includes species documented in the U.S. state of Kentucky by the Kentucky Bird Records Committee (KBRC) of the Kentucky Ornithological Society through January 2023. Another accidental species has been documented since that date. Of the 394 species, 108 are classed as accidental and six were introduced to North America. Four are extinct and three have been extirpated. An additional nine species are hypothetical as defined below. Birds that are considered probable escapees, although they may have been sighted flying free, are not included. Three additional accidental species have been added from another source.

This list is presented in the taxonomic sequence of the Check-list of North and Middle American Birds, 7th edition through the 62nd Supplement, published by the American Ornithological Society (AOS). Common and scientific names are also those of the Check-list, except that the common names of families are from the Clements taxonomy because the AOS list does not include them.

The following tags are used to designate some species:

- (A) Accidental - A species on the Kentucky review list, for which the KOS requires documentation
- (E) Extirpated - a species which no longer occurs in Kentucky but exists elsewhere
- (X) Extinct - a recent species that no longer exists
- (I) Introduced - a species established solely as result of direct or indirect human intervention
- (H) Hypothetical - species with only sight records or questionable reports, which also require documentation

== Ducks, geese, and waterfowl ==
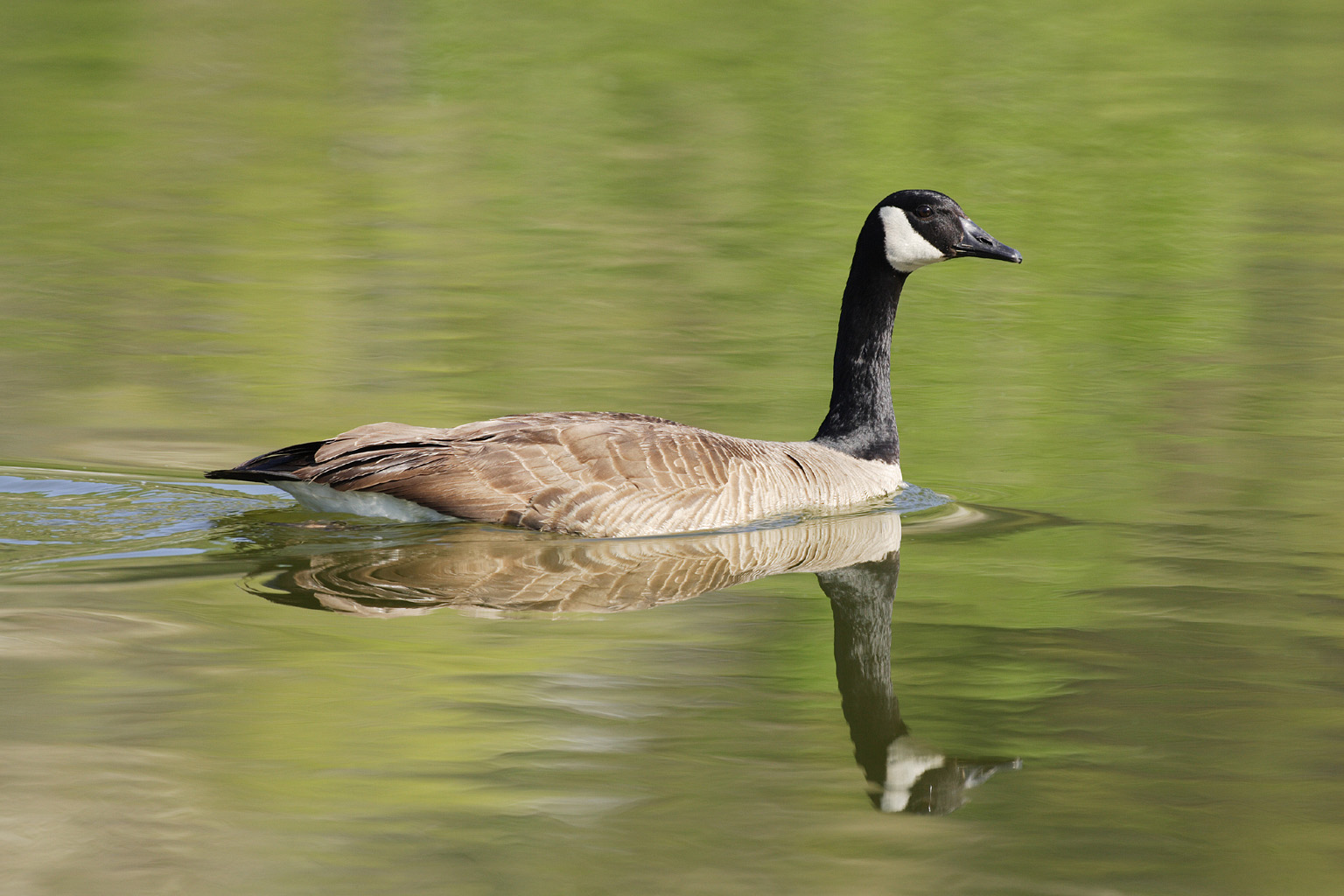
Canada goose

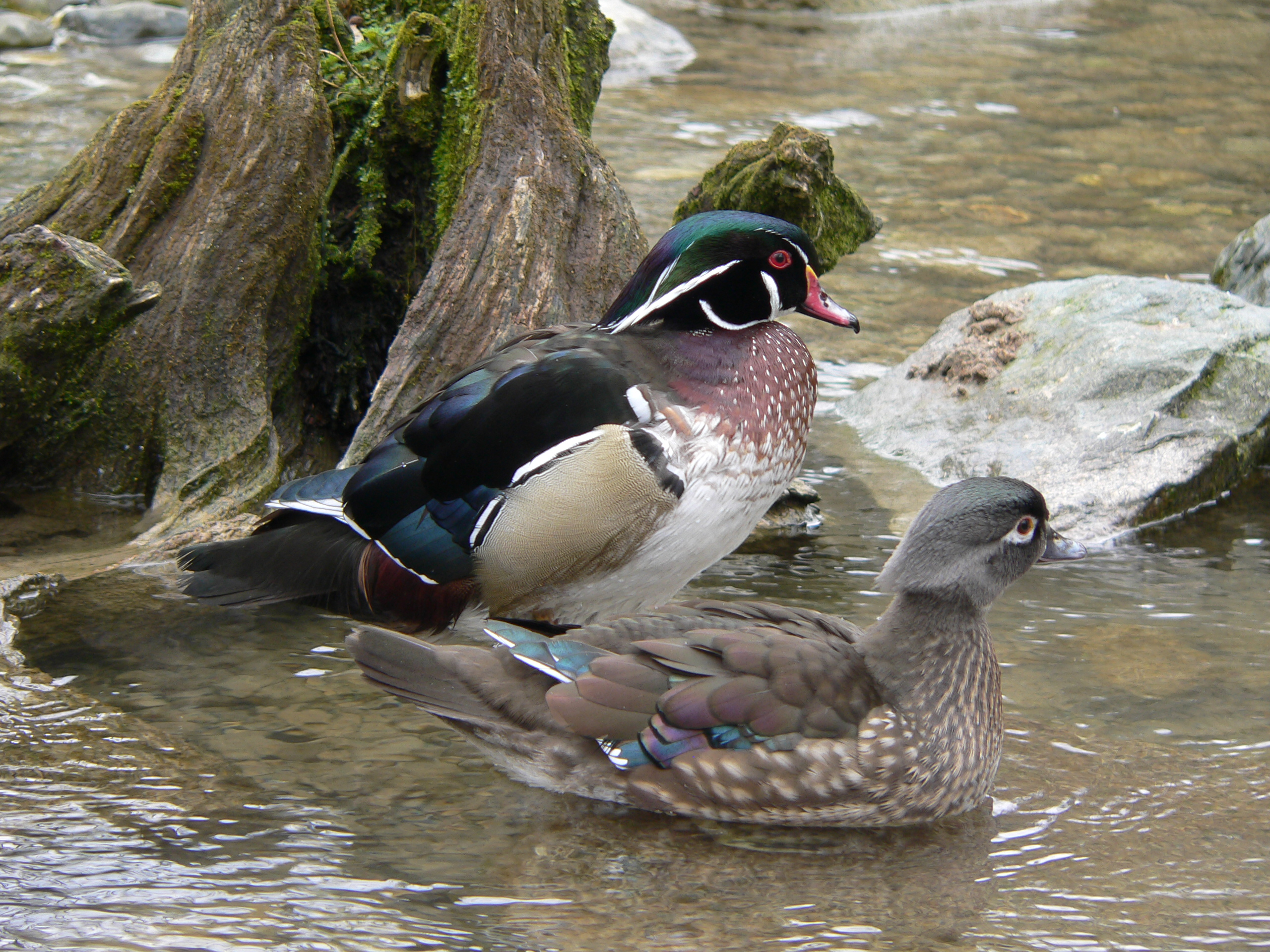
Wood duck

Order: Anseriformes Family: Anatidae

The family Anatidae includes the ducks and most duck-like waterfowl, such as geese and swans. These birds are adapted to an aquatic existence with webbed feet, bills which are flattened to a greater or lesser extent, and feathers that are excellent at shedding water due to special oils. Forty-four species have been recorded in Kentucky.

- Black-bellied whistling-duck, Dendrocygna autumnalis (A)
- Fulvous whistling-duck, Dendrocygna bicolor (A)
- Snow goose, Anser caerulescens
- Ross's goose, Anser rossii
- Greater white-fronted goose, Anser albifrons
- Pink-footed goose, Anser autumnalis (A)
- Brant, Branta bernicla (A)
- Barnacle goose, Branta leucopsis (H)
- Cackling goose, Branta hutchinsii
- Canada goose, Branta canadensis
- Mute swan, Cygnus olor (I)
- Trumpeter swan, Cygnus buccinator (A)
- Tundra swan, Cygnus columbianus
- Wood duck, Aix sponsa
- Cinnamon teal, Spatula cyanoptera (A)
- Northern shoveler, Spatula clypeata
- Gadwall, Mareca strepera
- Eurasian wigeon, Mareca penelope (A)
- American wigeon, Mareca americana
- Mallard, Anas platyrhynchos
- American black duck, Anas rubripes
- Mottled Duck, Anas fulvigula (A)
- Northern pintail, Anas acuta
- Blue-winged teal, Anas discors
- Green-winged teal, Anas crecca carolinensis
- Canvasback, Aythya valisineria
- Redhead, Aythya americana
- Ring-necked duck, Aythya collaris
- Tufted duck, Aythya fuligula (A)
- Greater scaup, Aythya marila
- Lesser scaup, Aythya affinis
- King eider, Somateria spectabilis (A)
- Harlequin duck, Histrionicus histrionicus (A)
- Surf scoter, Melanitta perspicillata
- White-winged scoter, Melanitta deglandi
- Black scoter, Melanitta americana
- Long-tailed duck, Clangula hyemalis
- Bufflehead, Bucephala albeola
- Common goldeneye, Bucephala clangula
- Barrow's goldeneye, Bucephala islandica (H)
- Hooded merganser, Lophodytes cucullatus
- Common merganser, Mergus merganser
- Red-breasted merganser, Mergus serrator
- Ruddy duck, Oxyura jamaicensis

== New World quail ==
Order: Galliformes Family: Odontophoridae

The New World quails are small, plump terrestrial birds only distantly related to the quails of the Old World, but named for their similar appearance and habits. One species has been recorded in Kentucky.

- Northern bobwhite, Colinus virginianus

== Pheasants, grouse, and allies ==
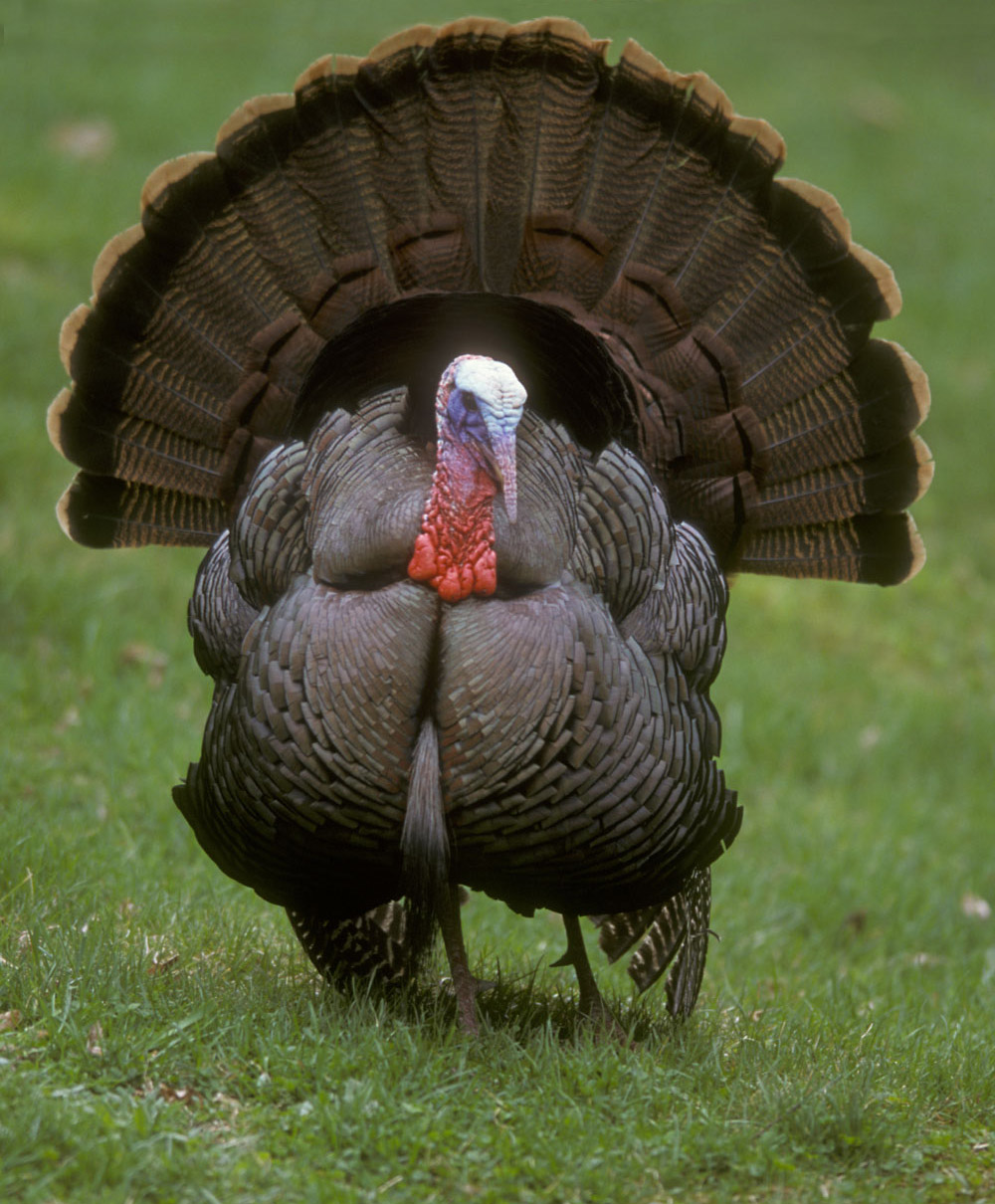
Wild turkey

Order: Galliformes Family: Phasianidae

Phasianidae consists of the pheasants and their allies. These are terrestrial species, variable in size but generally plump with broad relatively short wings. Many species are gamebirds or have been domesticated as a food source for humans. Three species have been recorded in Kentucky.

- Wild turkey, Meleagris gallopavo
- Ruffed grouse, Bonasa umbellus
- Greater prairie-chicken, Tympanuchus cupido (A) (E)

== Flamingoes ==
Order: Phoenicopteriformes Family: Phoenicopteridae

Flamingoes are gregarious wading birds, usually 3 to 5 feet (0.9 to 1.5 m) tall, found in both the Western and Eastern Hemispheres. Flamingos filter-feed on shellfish and algae. Their oddly shaped beaks are adapted to separate mud and silt from the food they consume and, uniquely, are used upside-down. One species has been recorded in Kentucky.

- American flamingo, Phoenicopterus ruber (A)

== Grebes ==
Order: Podicipediformes Family: Podicipedidae

Grebes are small to medium-large freshwater diving birds. They have lobed toes and are excellent swimmers and divers. However, they have their feet placed far back on the body, making them quite ungainly on land. Five species have been recorded in Kentucky.

- Pied-billed grebe, Podilymbus podiceps
- Horned grebe, Podiceps auritus
- Red-necked grebe, Podiceps grisegena
- Eared grebe, Podiceps nigricollis
- Western grebe, Aechmorphorus occidentalis (A)

== Pigeons and doves ==
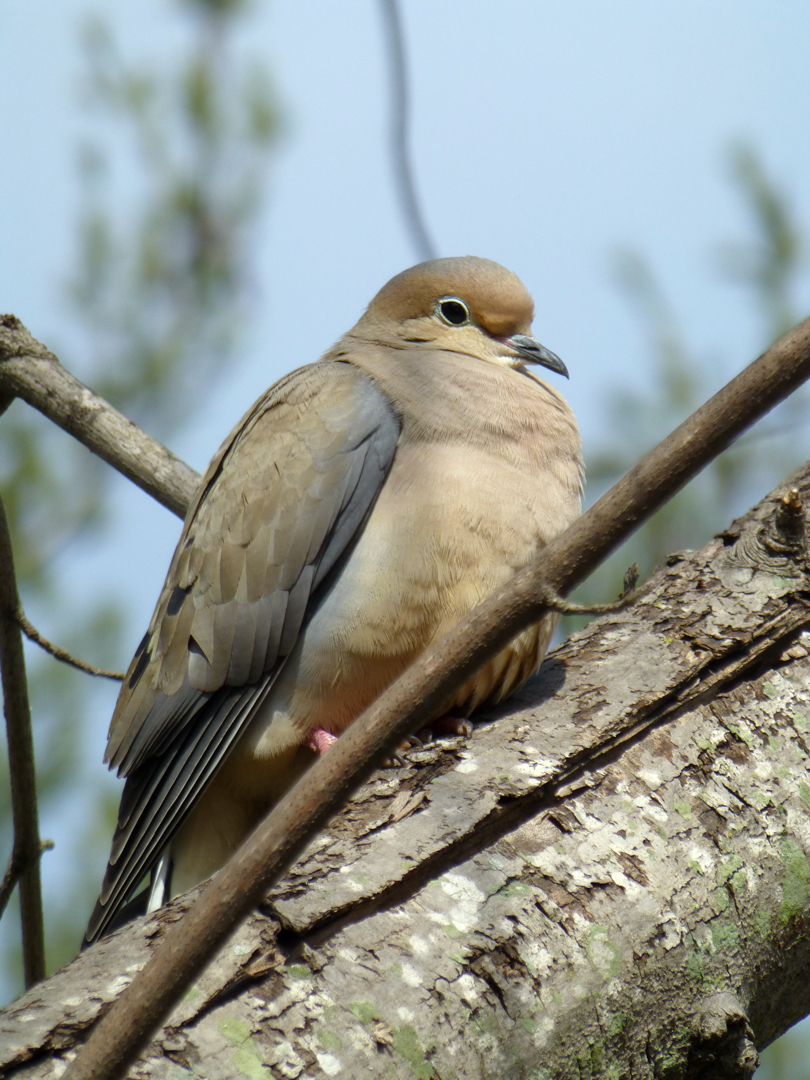
Mourning dove

Order: Columbiformes Family: Columbidae

Pigeons and doves are stout-bodied birds with short necks and short slender bills with a fleshy cere. Eight species have been recorded in Kentucky.

- Rock pigeon, Columba livia (I)
- Band-tailed pigeon, Patagioenas fasciata (A)
- Eurasian collared-dove, Streptopelia decaocto (I)
- Passenger pigeon, Ectopistes migratorius (X)
- Inca dove, Columbina inca (A)
- Common ground dove, Columbina passerina (A)
- White-winged dove, Zenaida asiatica (A)
- Mourning dove, Zenaida macroura

== Cuckoos ==
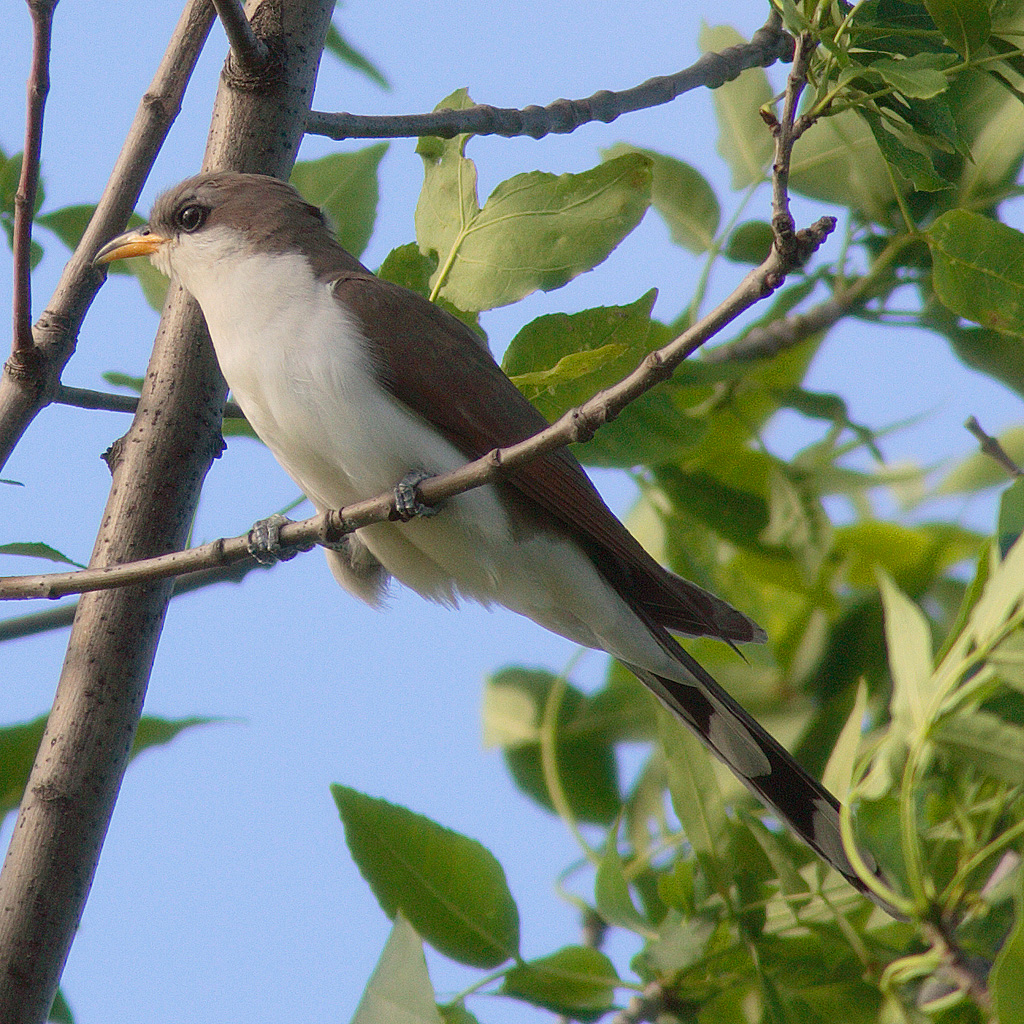
Yellow-billed cuckoo

Order: Cuculiformes Family: Cuculidae

The family Cuculidae includes cuckoos, roadrunners, and anis. These birds are of variable size with slender bodies, long tails, and strong legs. The Old World cuckoos are brood parasites. Three species have been recorded in Kentucky.

- Groove-billed ani, Crotophaga sulcirostris (A)
- Yellow-billed cuckoo, Coccyzus americanus
- Black-billed cuckoo, Coccyzus erythropthalmus

== Nightjars and allies ==
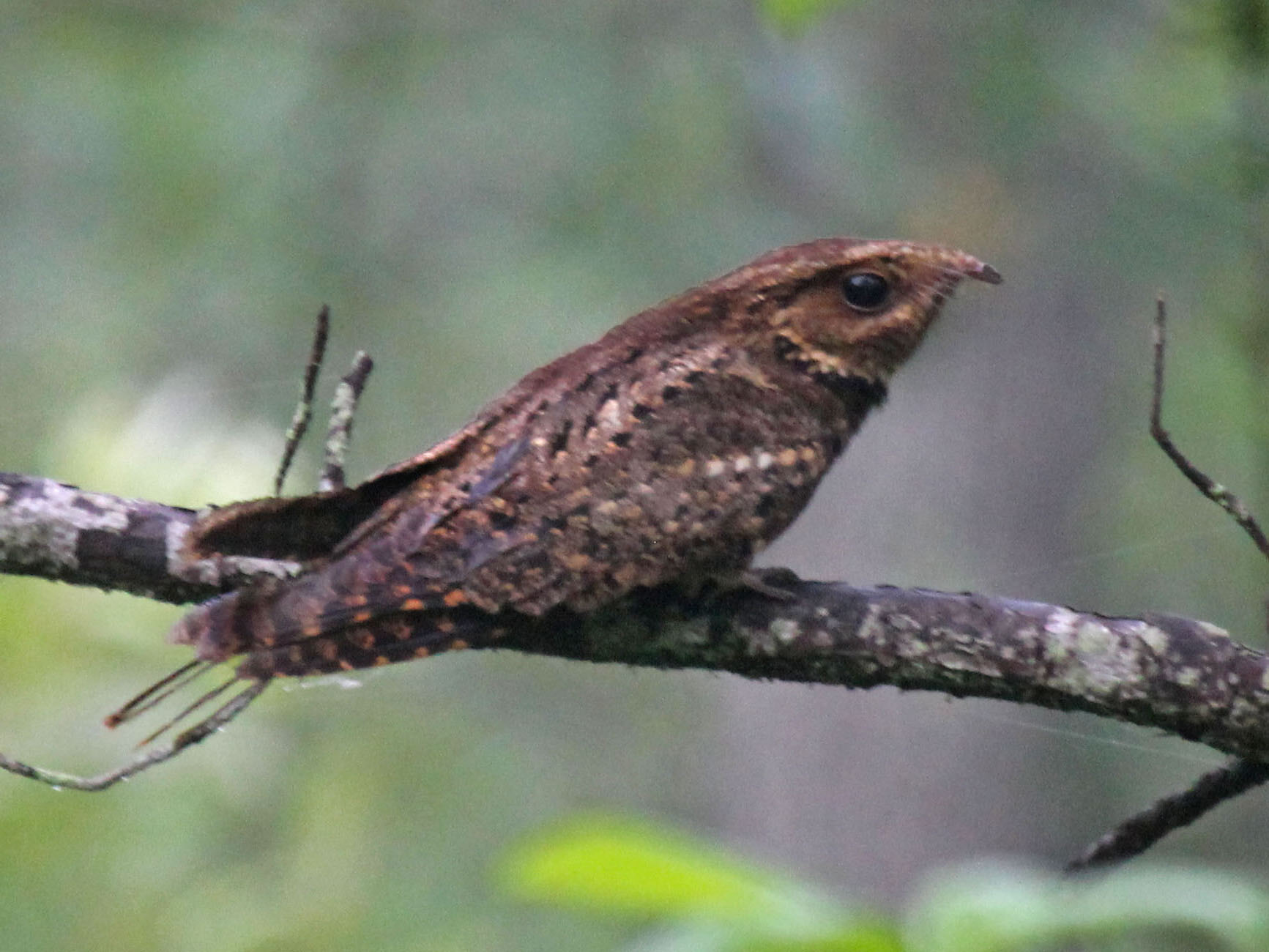
Chuck-will's-widow

Order: Caprimulgiformes Family: Caprimulgidae

Nightjars are medium-sized nocturnal birds that usually nest on the ground. They have long wings, short legs, and very short bills. Most have small feet, of little use for walking, and long pointed wings. Their soft plumage is cryptically colored to resemble bark or leaves. Three species have been recorded in Kentucky.

- Common nighthawk, Chordeiles minor
- Chuck-will's-widow, Antrostomus carolinensis
- Eastern whip-poor-will, Antrostomus vociferus

== Swifts ==
Order: Apodiformes Family: Apodidae

The swifts are small birds which spend the majority of their lives flying. These birds have very short legs and never settle voluntarily on the ground, perching instead only on vertical surfaces. Many swifts have very long, swept-back wings which resemble a crescent or boomerang. One species has been recorded in Kentucky.

- Chimney swift, Chaetura pelagica

== Hummingbirds ==
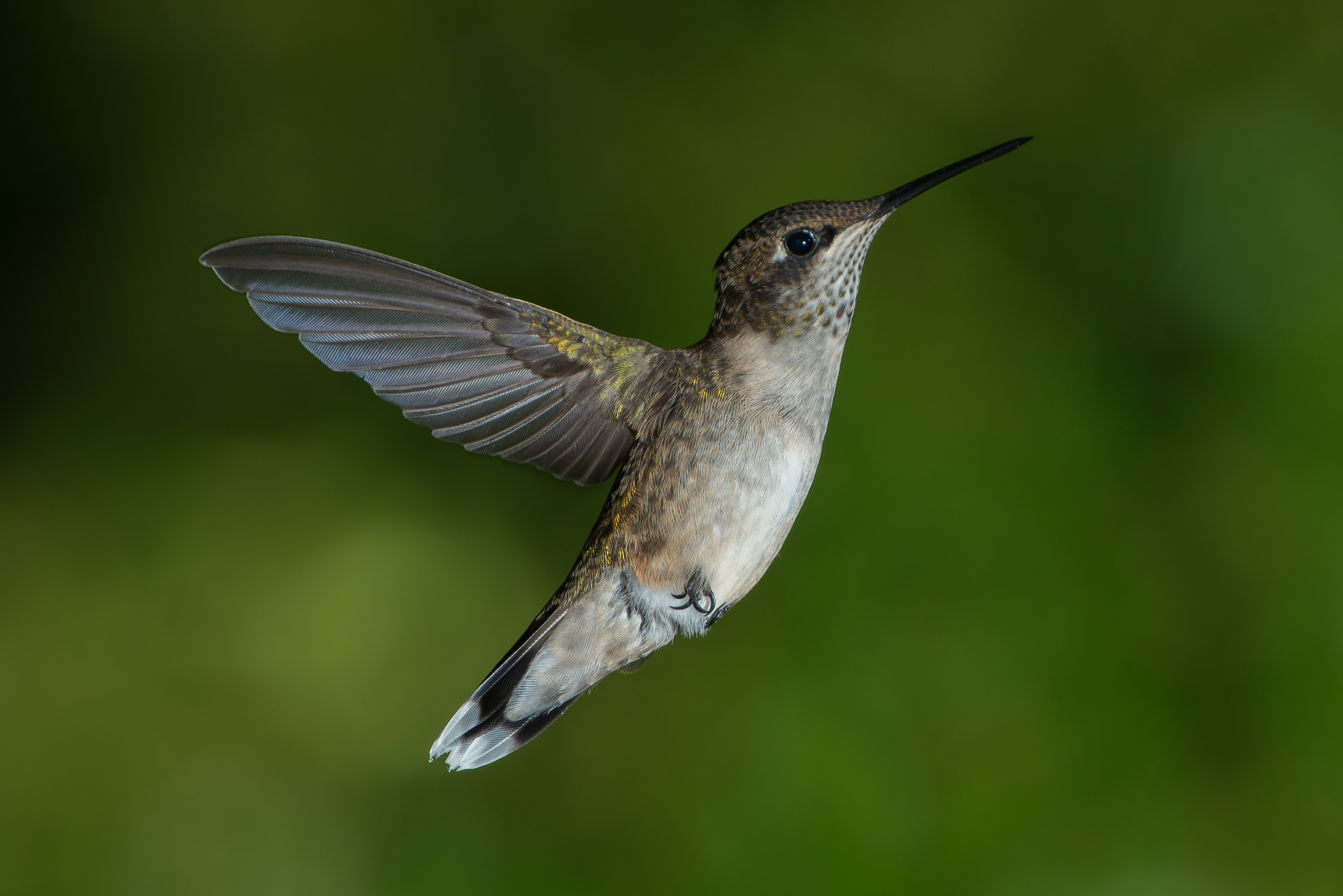
Ruby-throated hummingbird

Order: Apodiformes Family: Trochilidae

Hummingbirds are small birds capable of hovering in mid-air due to the rapid flapping of their wings. They are the only birds that can fly backwards. Five species have been recorded in Kentucky.

- Mexican violetear, Colibri thalassinus (A)
- Ruby-throated hummingbird, Archilochus colubris
- Black-chinned hummingbird, Archilochus alexandri (A)
- Anna's hummingbird, Calypte anna (A)
- Rufous hummingbird, Selasphorus rufus

== Rails, gallinules, and coots ==
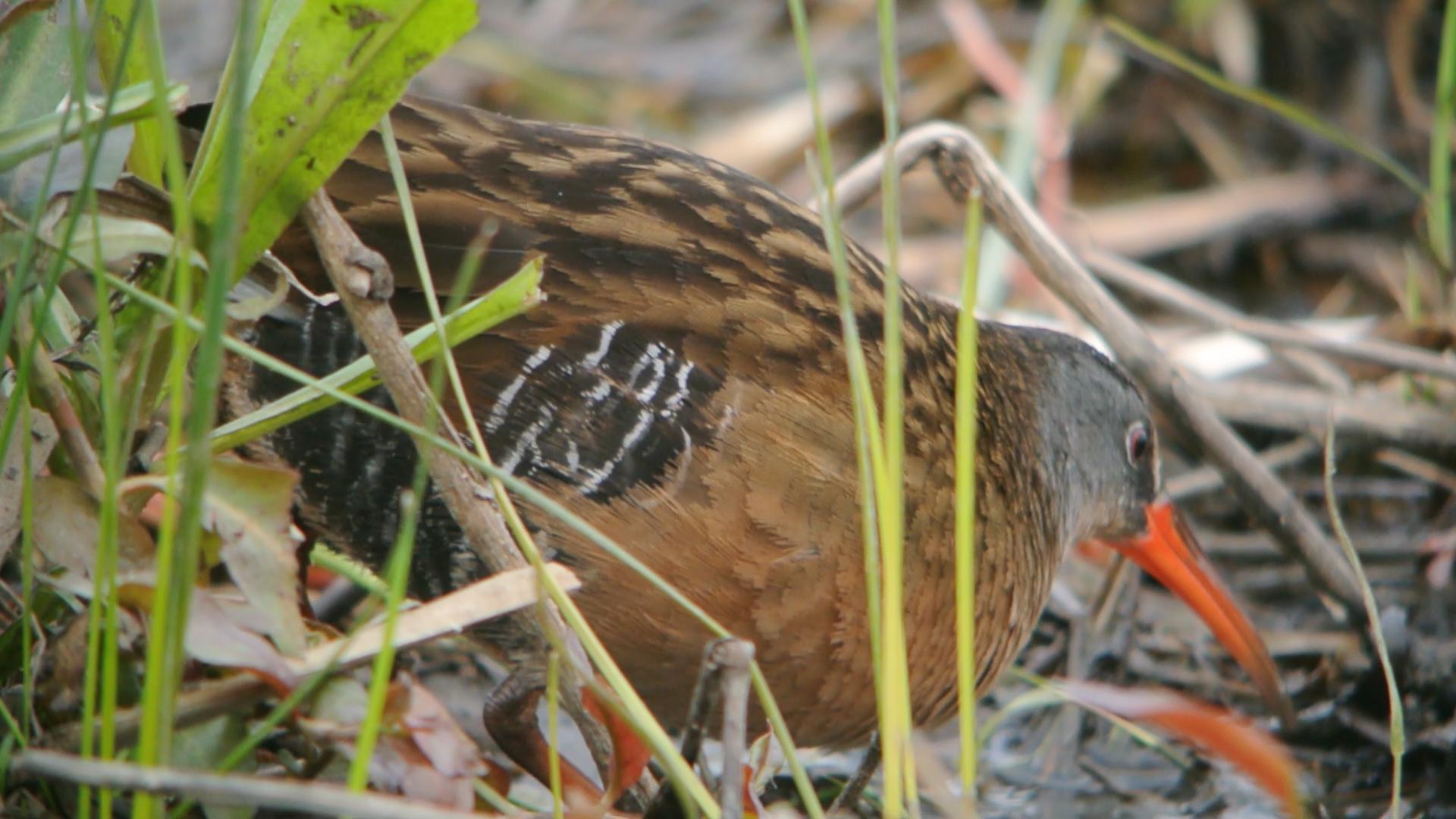
Virginia rail

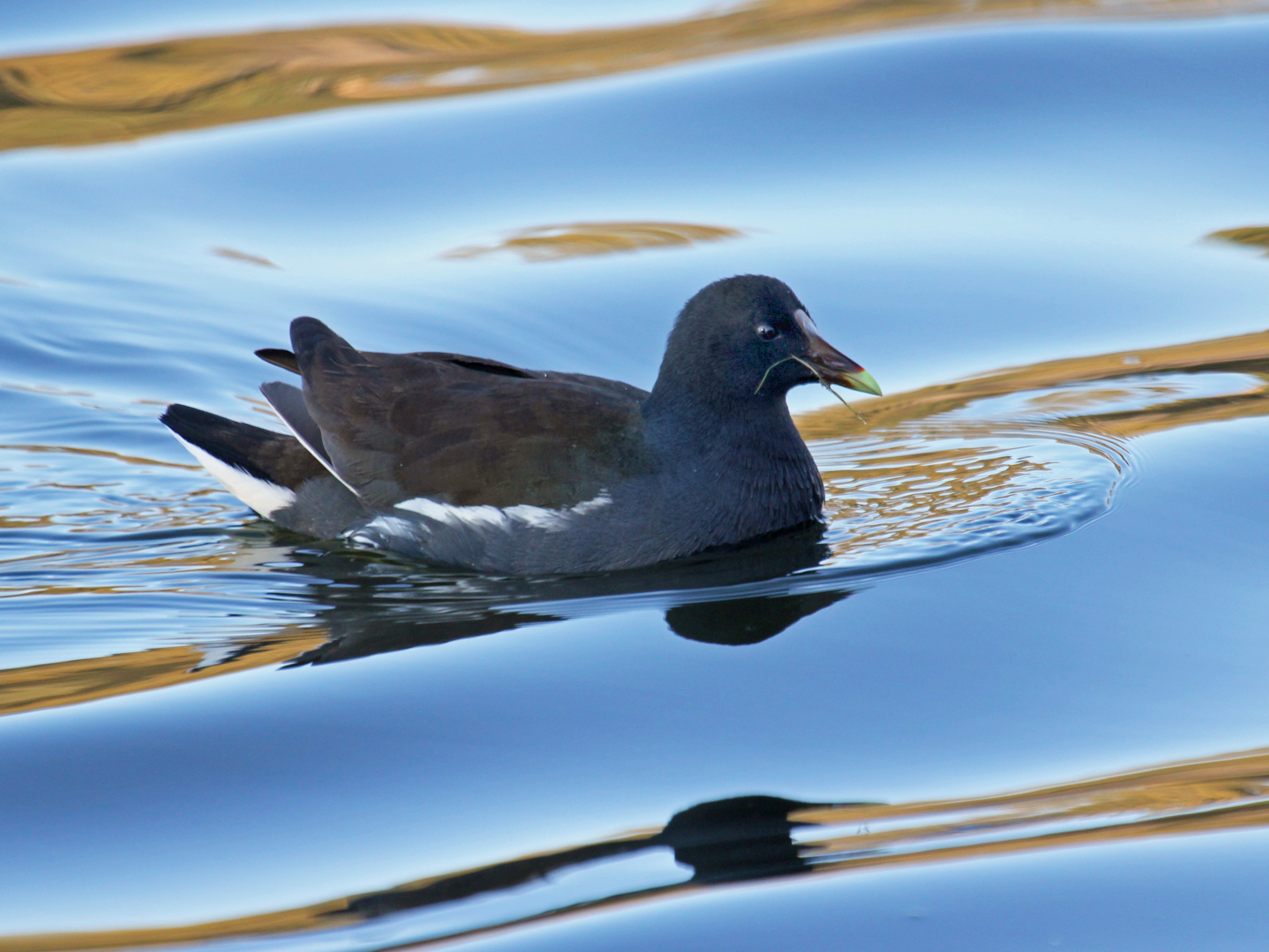
Common gallinule

Order: Gruiformes Family: Rallidae

Rallidae is a large family of small to medium-sized birds which includes the rails, crakes, coots, and gallinules. The most typical family members occupy dense vegetation in damp environments near lakes, swamps, or rivers. In general they are shy and secretive birds, making them difficult to observe. Most species have strong legs and long toes which are well adapted to soft uneven surfaces. They tend to have short, rounded wings and tend to be weak fliers. Eight species have been recorded in Kentucky.

- King rail, Rallus elegans (A)
- Virginia rail, Rallus limicola
- Sora, Porzana carolina
- Common gallinule, Gallinula galeata
- American coot, Fulica americana
- Purple gallinule, Porphyrio martinicus (A)
- Yellow rail, Coturnicops noveboracensis (A)
- Black rail, Laterallus jamaicensis (H)

== Limpkin ==
Order: Gruiformes Family: Aramidae

The limpkin is an odd bird that looks like a large rail, but is skeletally closer to the cranes. It is found in marshes with some trees or scrub in the Caribbean, South America, and southern Florida. One species has been recorded in Kentucky.

- Limpkin, Aramus guarauna (A)

== Cranes ==
Order: Gruiformes Family: Gruidae

Cranes are large, long-legged and long-necked birds. Unlike the similar-looking but unrelated herons, cranes fly with necks outstretched, not pulled back. Most have elaborate and noisy courting displays or "dances". Two species have been recorded in Kentucky.

- Sandhill crane, Antigone canadensis
- Whooping crane, Grus americana ("natural" (non-introduced) birds are considered (E))

== Stilts and avocets ==
Order: Charadriiformes Family: Recurvirostridae

Recurvirostridae is a family of large wading birds which includes the avocets and stilts. The avocets have long legs and long up-curved bills. The stilts have extremely long legs and long, thin, straight bills. Two species have been recorded in Kentucky.

- Black-necked stilt, Himantopus mexicanus
- American avocet, Recurvirostra americana

== Oystercatchers ==
Order: Charadriiformes Family: Haematopodidae

The oystercatchers are large, obvious, and noisy plover-like birds, with strong bills used for smashing or prying open molluscs. One species has been recorded in Kentucky.

- American oystercatcher, Haematopus palliatus (A)

== Plovers and lapwings ==
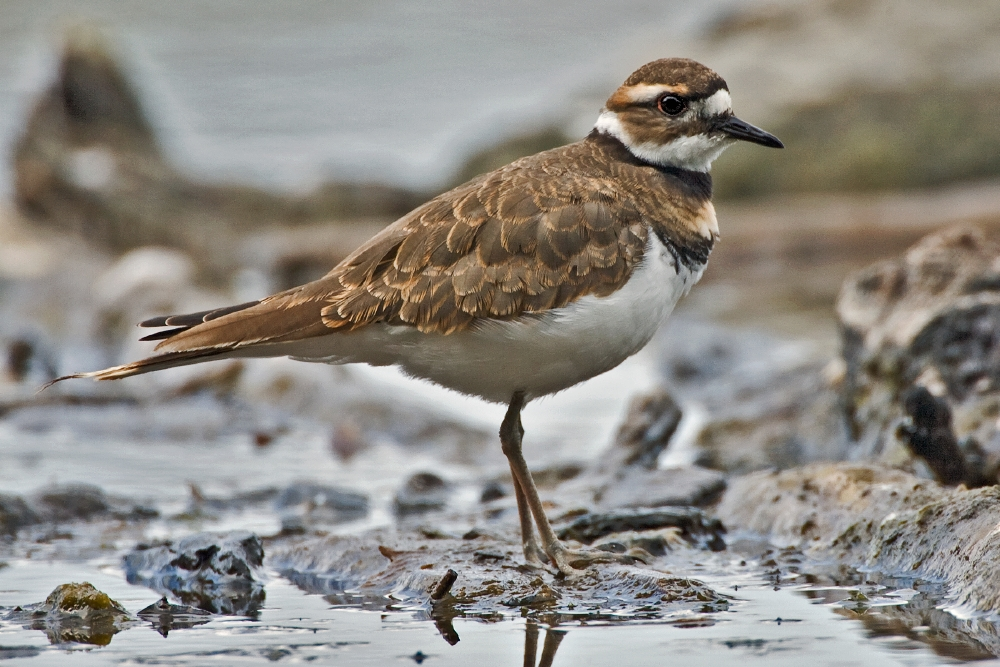
Killdeer

Order: Charadriiformes Family: Charadriidae

The family Charadriidae includes the plovers, dotterels, and lapwings. They are small to medium-sized birds with compact bodies, short thick necks, and long, usually pointed, wings. They are found in open country worldwide, mostly in habitats near water. Five species have been recorded in Kentucky.

- Killdeer, Charadrius vociferus
- Black-bellied plover, Pluvialis squatarola
- American golden-plover, Pluvialis dominica
- Semipalmated plover, Charadrius semipalmatus
- Piping plover, Charadrius melodus

== Sandpipers and allies ==
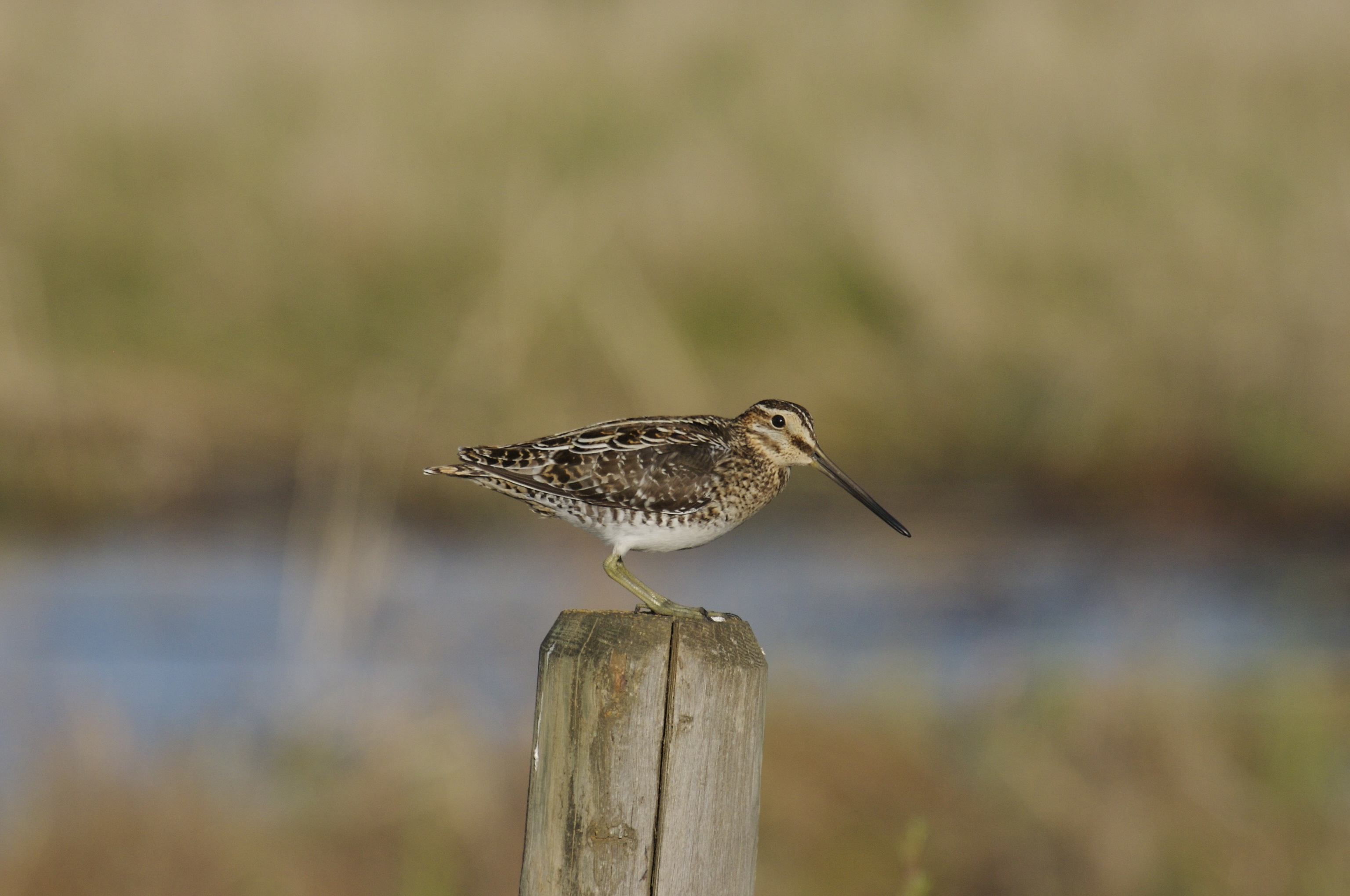
Wilson's snipe

Order: Charadriiformes Family: Scolopacidae

Scolopacidae is a large diverse family of small to medium-sized shorebirds including the sandpipers, curlews, godwits, shanks, tattlers, woodcocks, snipes, dowitchers, and phalaropes. The majority of these species eat small invertebrates picked out of the mud or soil. Different lengths of legs and bills enable multiple species to feed in the same habitat, particularly on the coast, without direct competition for food. Thirty-five species have been recorded in Kentucky.

- Upland sandpiper, Bartramia longicauda
- Whimbrel, Numenius phaeopus (A)
- Long-billed curlew, Numenius americanus (H)
- Hudsonian godwit, Limosa haemastica (A)
- Marbled godwit, Limosa fedoa
- Ruddy turnstone, Arenaria interpres
- Red knot, Calidris canutus (A)
- Ruff, Calidris pugnax (A)
- Stilt sandpiper, Calidris himantopus
- Curlew sandpiper, Calidris ferruginea (A)
- Red-necked stint, Calidris ruficollis (A)
- Sanderling, Calidris alba
- Dunlin, Calidris alpina
- Purple sandpiper, Calidris maritima (H)
- Baird's sandpiper, Calidris bairdii
- Little stint, Calidris minuta (A)
- Least sandpiper, Calidris minutilla
- White-rumped sandpiper, Calidris fuscicollis
- Buff-breasted sandpiper, Calidris subruficollis
- Pectoral sandpiper, Calidris melanotos
- Semipalmated sandpiper, Calidris pusilla
- Western sandpiper, Calidris mauri
- Short-billed dowitcher, Limnodromus griseus
- Long-billed dowitcher, Limnodromus scolopaceus
- American woodcock, Scolopax minor
- Wilson's snipe, Gallinago delicata
- Spotted sandpiper, Actitis macularius
- Solitary sandpiper, Tringa solitaria
- Lesser yellowlegs, Tringa flavipes
- Willet, Tringa semipalmata
- Greater yellowlegs, Tringa melanoleuca
- Wilson's phalarope, Phalaropus tricolor
- Red-necked phalarope, Phalaropus lobatus
- Red phalarope, Phalaropus fulicarius (A)

== Skuas and jaegers ==
Order: Charadriiformes Family: Stercorariidae

They are in general medium to large birds, typically with gray or brown plumage, often with white markings on the wings. They have longish bills with hooked tips and webbed feet with sharp claws. They look like large dark gulls, but have a fleshy cere above the upper mandible. They are strong, acrobatic fliers. Three species have been recorded in Kentucky.

- Pomarine jaeger, Stercorarius pomarinus (A)
- Parasitic jaeger, Stercorarius parasiticus (A)
- Long-tailed jaeger, Stercorarius longicaudus (A)

== Auks, murres, and puffins ==
Order: Charadriiformes Family: Alcidae

The family Alcidae includes auks, murres, and puffins. These are short winged birds that live on the open sea and normally only come ashore for breeding. One species has been recorded in Kentucky.

- Long-billed murrelet, Brachyramphus perdix (A)

== Gulls, terns, and skimmers ==
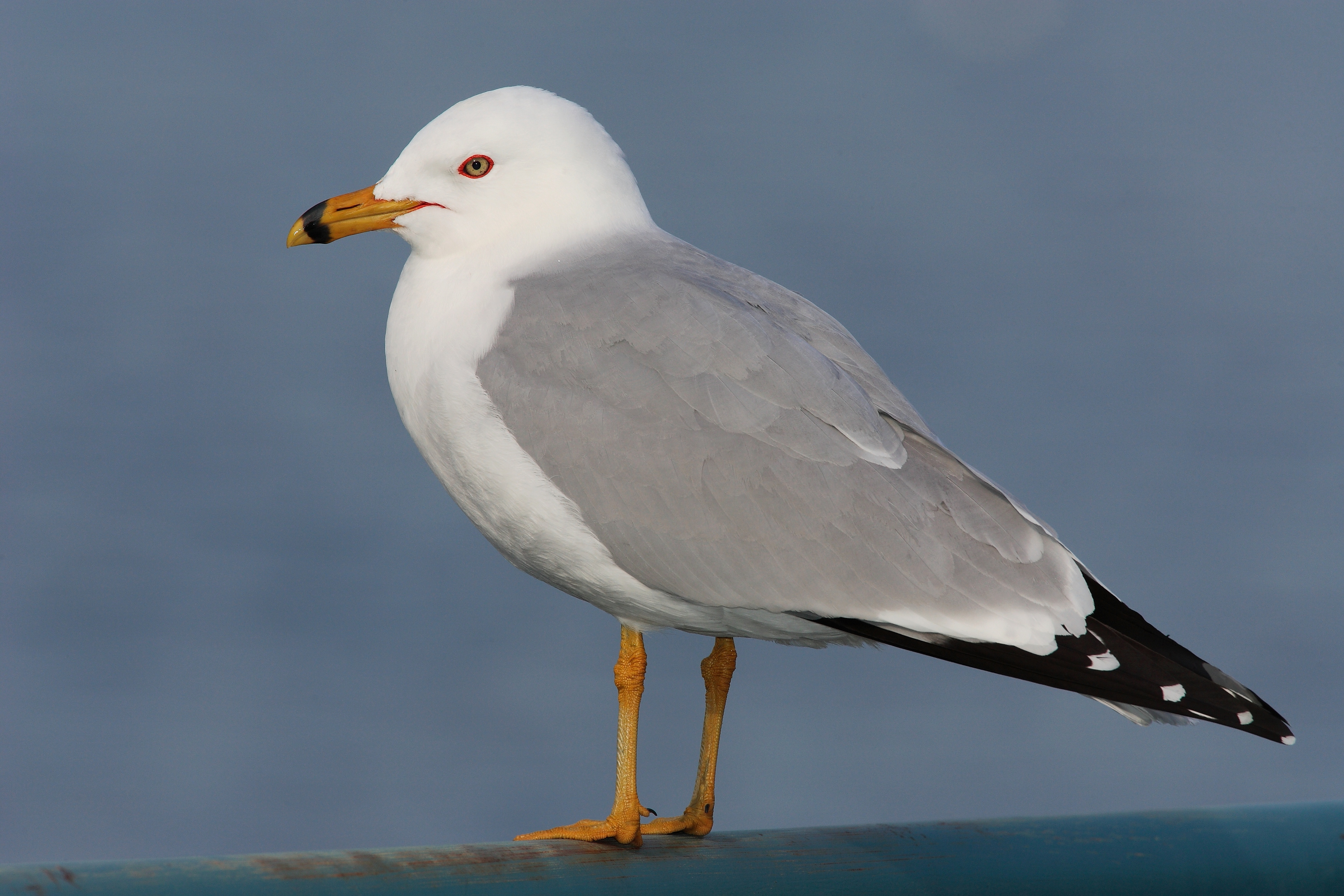
Ring-billed gull

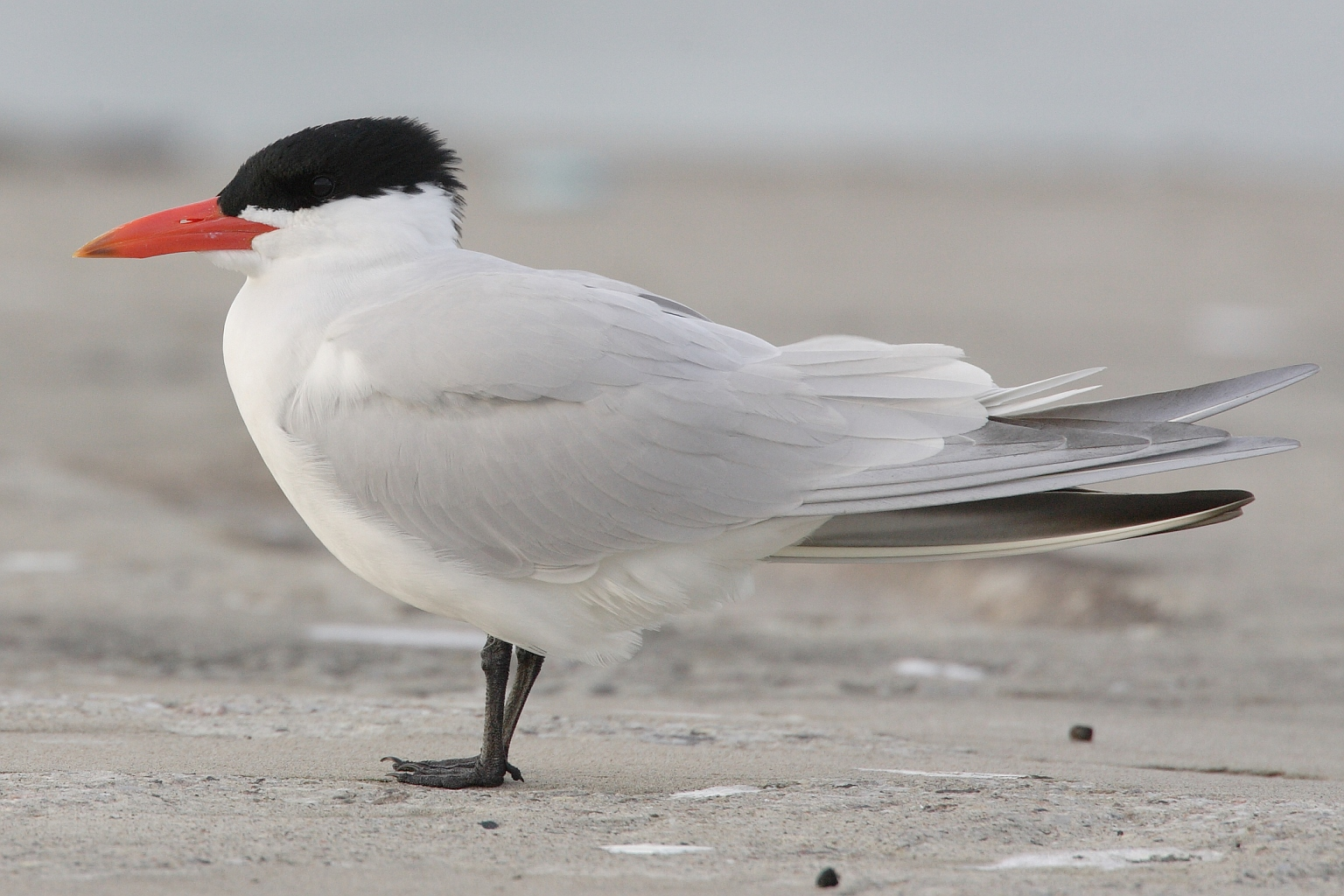
Caspian tern

Order: Charadriiformes Family: Laridae

Laridae is a family of medium to large seabirds and includes gulls, terns, kittiwakes, and skimmers. They are typically gray or white, often with black markings on the head or wings. They have stout, longish bills and webbed feet. Twenty-four species have been recorded in Kentucky.

- Black-legged kittiwake, Rissa tridactyla (A)
- Sabine's gull, Xema sabini (A)
- Bonaparte's gull, Chroicocephalus philadelphia
- Black-headed gull, Chroicocephalus ridibundus (A)
- Little gull, Hydrocoleus minutus (A)
- Laughing gull, Leucophaeus atricilla
- Franklin's gull, Leucophaeus pipixcan
- Common gull/short-billed gull, Larus canus/Larus brachyrhynchus (A) (Note: The KRBC list contains mew gull, which the AOS has split.)
- Ring-billed gull, Larus delawarensis
- California gull, Larus californicus (A)
- Herring gull, Larus argentatus
- Iceland gull, Larus glaucoides
- Lesser black-backed gull, Larus fuscus
- Glaucous gull, Larus hyperboreus
- Great black-backed gull, Larus marinus
- Sooty tern, Onychoprion fuscatus (A)
- Least tern, Sternula antillarum
- Gull-billed tern, Gelochelidon nilotica (A)
- Caspian tern, Hydroprogne caspia
- Black tern, Chlidonias niger
- Common tern, Sterna hirundo
- Forster's tern, Sterna forsteri
- Sandwich tern, Thalasseus sandvicensis (A)
- Black skimmer, Rhyncops niger (A)

== Loons ==
Order: Gaviiformes Family: Gaviidae

Loons are aquatic birds the size of a large duck, to which they are unrelated. Their plumage is largely gray or black, and they have spear-shaped bills. Loons swim well and fly adequately, but are almost hopeless on land, because their legs are placed towards the rear of the body. Four species have been recorded in Kentucky.

- Red-throated loon, Gavia stellata
- Pacific loon, Gavia pacifica (A)
- Common loon, Gavia immer
- Yellow-billed loon, Gavia adamsii (A)

== Northern storm-petrels ==
Order: Procellariiformes Family: Hydrobatidae

The storm-petrels are the smallest seabirds, relatives of the petrels, feeding on planktonic crustaceans and small fish picked from the surface, typically while hovering. The flight is fluttering and sometimes bat-like. One species has been recorded in Kentucky.

- Band-rumped storm-petrel, Hydrobates castro (A)

== Shearwaters and petrels ==
Order: Procellariiformes Family: Procellariidae

The procellariids are the main group of medium-sized "true petrels", characterized by united nostrils with medium septum and a long outer functional primary. Three species have been recorded in Kentucky.

- Black-capped petrel, Pterodroma hasitata (A)
- Great shearwater, Ardenna gravis (A)
- Sargasso shearwater, Puffinus lherminieri (A)

== Storks ==
Order: Ciconiiformes Family: Ciconiidae

Storks are large, heavy, long-legged, long-necked wading birds with long stout bills and wide wingspans. They lack the powder down that other wading birds such as herons, spoonbills and ibises use to clean off fish slime. Storks lack a pharynx and are mute. One species has been recorded in Kentucky.

- Wood stork, Mycteria americana (A)

== Frigatebirds ==
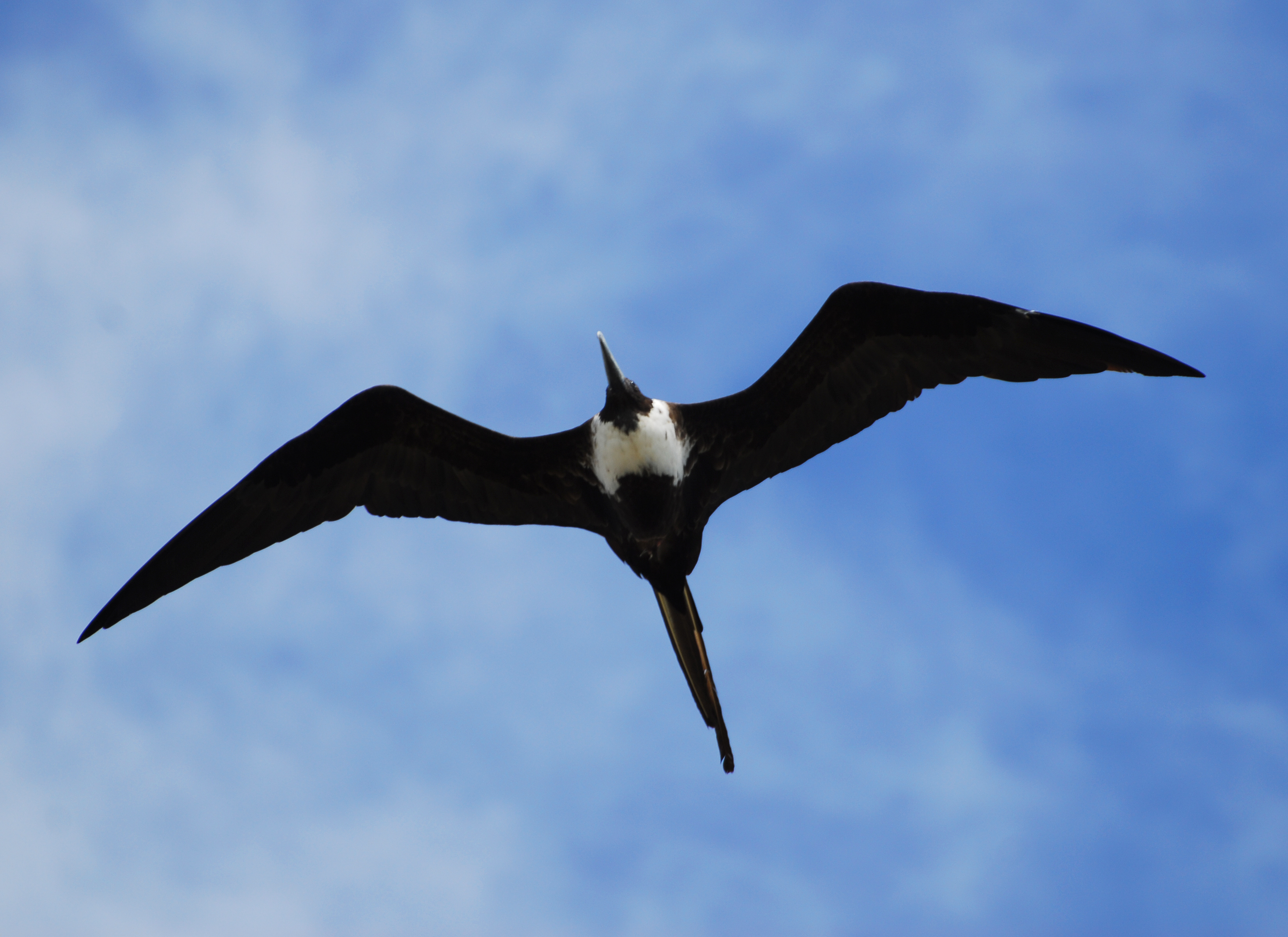
Magnificent frigatebird

Order: Suliformes Family: Fregatidae

Frigatebirds are large seabirds usually found over tropical oceans. They are large, black, or black-and-white, with long wings and deeply forked tails. The males have colored inflatable throat pouches. They do not swim or walk and cannot take off from a flat surface. Having the largest wingspan-to-body-weight ratio of any bird, they are essentially aerial, able to stay aloft for more than a week. One species has been recorded in Kentucky

- Magnificent frigatebird, Fregata magnificens (A)

== Boobies and gannets ==
Order: Suliformes Family: Sulidae

The sulids comprise the gannets and boobies. Both groups are medium-large coastal seabirds that plunge-dive for fish. Two species have been recorded in Kentucky.

- Brown booby, Sula leucogaster (A)
- Northern gannet, Morus bassanus (A)

== Anhingas ==
Order: Suliformes Family: Anhingidae

Anhingas are cormorant-like water birds with very long necks and long, straight beaks. They are fish eaters which often swim with only their neck above the water. One species has been recorded in Kentucky.

- Anhinga, Anhinga anhinga (A)

== Cormorants and shags ==
Order: Suliformes Family: Phalacrocoracidae

Cormorants are medium-to-large aquatic birds, usually with mainly dark plumage and areas of colored skin on the face. The bill is long, thin, and sharply hooked. Their feet are four-toed and webbed. Two species have been recorded in Kentucky.

- Double-crested cormorant, Nannopterum auritum
- Neotropic cormorant, Nannopterum brasilianum (A)

== Pelicans ==
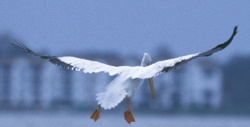
American white pelican

Order: Pelecaniformes Family: Pelecanidae

Pelicans are very large water birds with a distinctive pouch under their beak. Like other birds in the order Pelecaniformes, they have four webbed toes. Two species have been recorded in Kentucky.

- American white pelican, Pelecanus erythrorhynchos
- Brown pelican, Pelecanus occidentalis (A)

== Herons, egrets, and bitterns ==
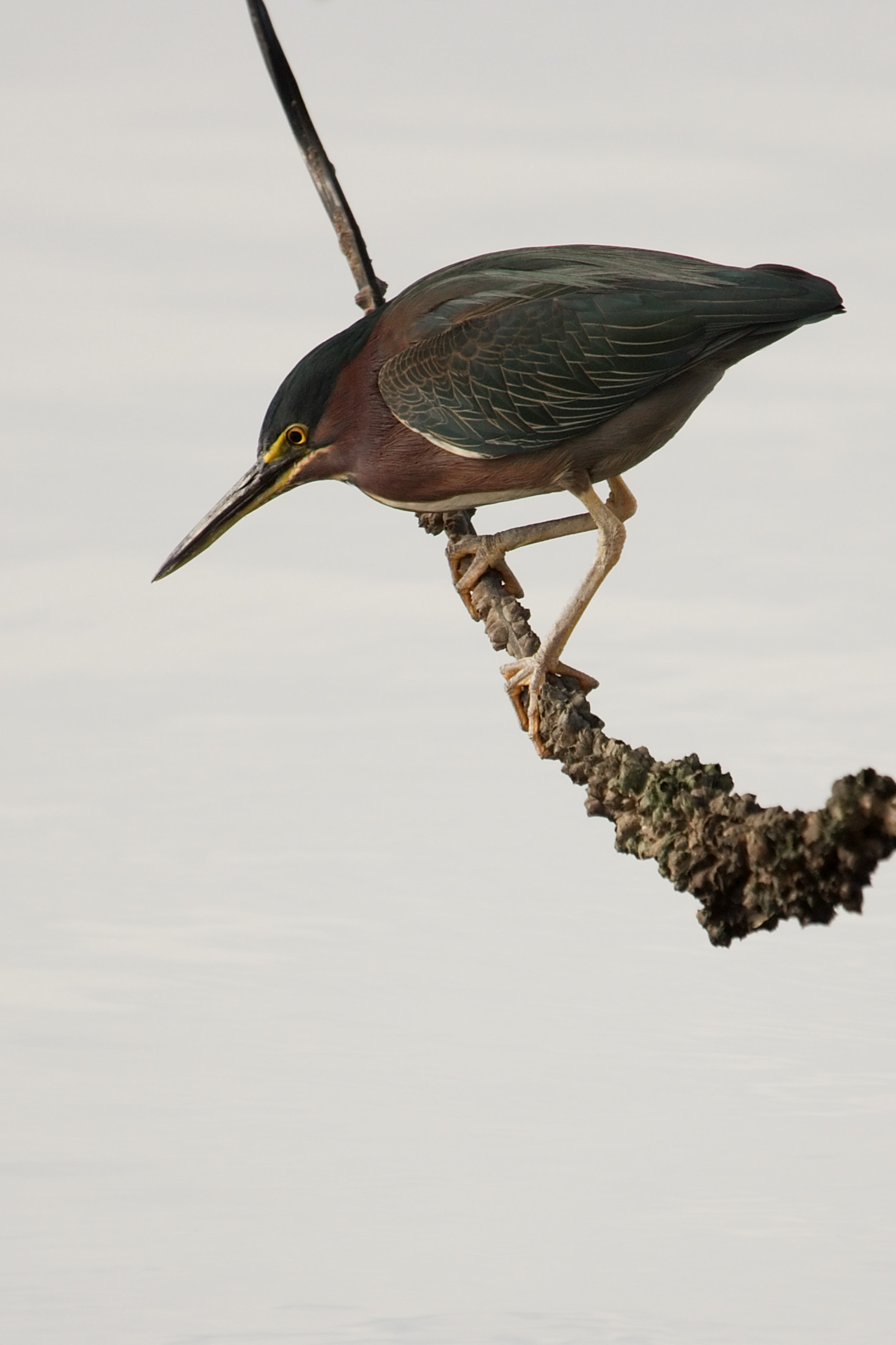
Green heron

Order: Pelecaniformes Family: Ardeidae

The family Ardeidae contains the herons, egrets, and bitterns. Herons and egrets are medium to large wading birds with long necks and legs. Bitterns tend to be shorter-necked and more secretive. Members of Ardeidae fly with their necks retracted, unlike other long-necked birds such as storks, ibises, and spoonbills. Twelve species have been recorded in Kentucky.

- American bittern, Botaurus lentiginosus
- Least bittern, Ixobrychus exilis
- Great blue heron, Ardea herodias
- Great egret, Ardea alba
- Snowy egret, Egretta thula
- Little blue heron, Egretta caerulea
- Tricolored heron, Egretta tricolor (A)
- Reddish egret, Egretta rufescens (A)
- Cattle egret, Bubulcus ibis
- Green heron, Butorides virescens
- Black-crowned night-heron, Nycticorax nycticorax
- Yellow-crowned night-heron, Nyctanassa violacea

== Ibises and spoonbills ==
Order: Pelecaniformes Family: Threskiornithidae

The family Threskiornithidae includes the ibises and spoonbills. They have long, broad wings. Their bodies tend to be elongated, the neck more so, with rather long legs. The bill is also long, decurved in the case of the ibises, straight and distinctively flattened in the spoonbills. Four species have been recorded in Kentucky.

- White ibis, Eudocimus albus
- Glossy ibis, Plegadis falcinellus (A)
- White-faced ibis, Plegadis chihi (A)
- Roseate spoonbill, Platalea ajaja (A)

== New World vultures ==
Order: Cathartiformes Family: Cathartidae

The New World vultures are not closely related to Old World vultures, but superficially resemble them because of convergent evolution. Like the Old World vultures, they are scavengers, however, unlike Old World vultures, which find carcasses by sight, New World vultures have a good sense of smell with which they locate carcasses. Two species have been recorded in Kentucky.

- Black vulture, Coragyps atratus
- Turkey vulture, Cathartes aura

== Osprey ==
Order: Accipitriformes Family: Pandionidae

Pandionidae is a family of fish-eating birds of prey, possessing a very large, powerful hooked beak for tearing flesh from their prey, strong legs, powerful talons, and keen eyesight. The family is monotypic.

- Osprey, Pandion haliaetus

== Hawks, eagles, and kites ==
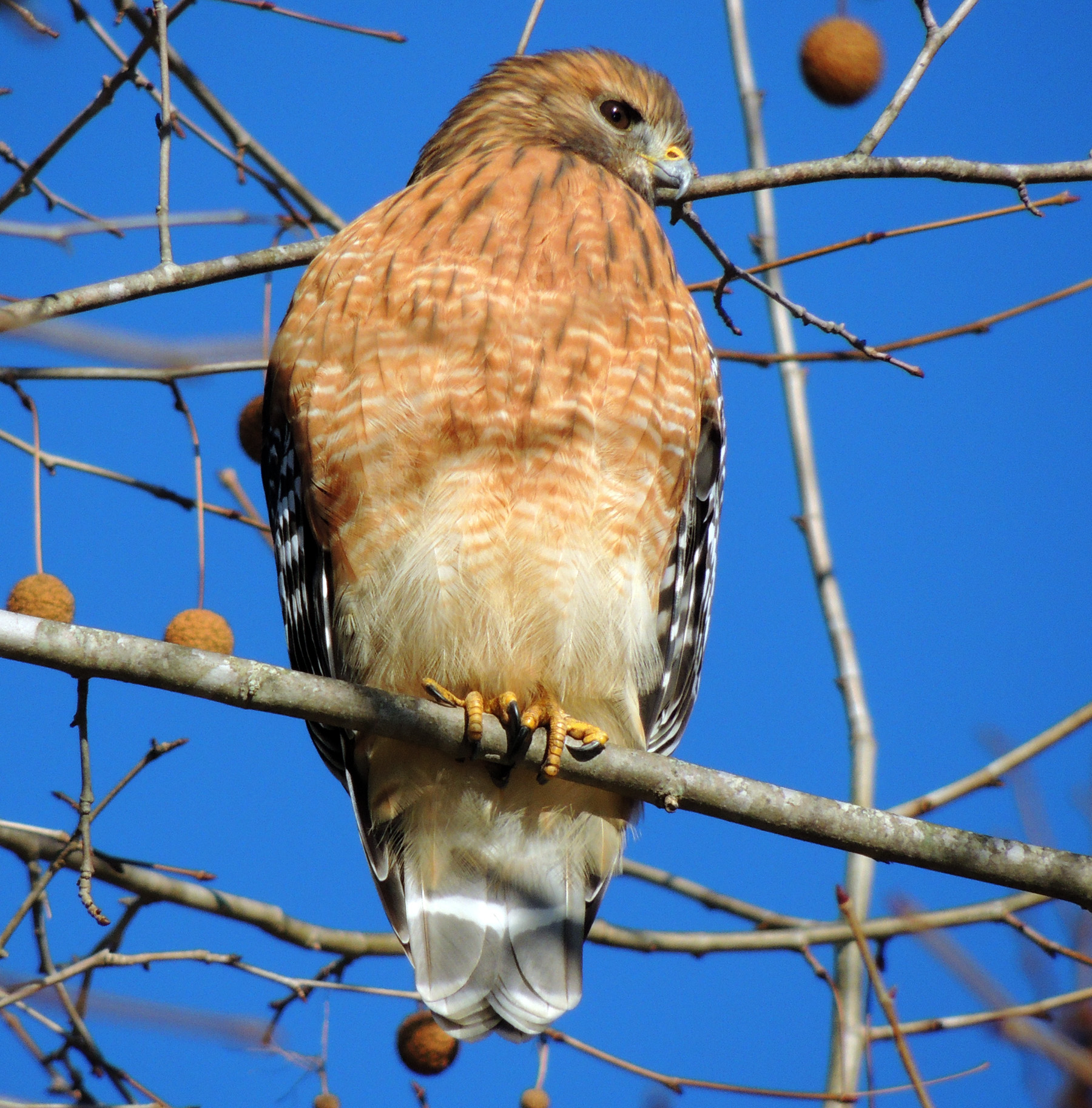
Red-shouldered hawk

Order: Accipitriformes Family: Accipitridae

Accipitridae is a family of birds of prey which includes hawks, eagles, kites, harriers, and Old World vultures. These birds have very large powerful hooked beaks for tearing flesh from their prey, strong legs, powerful talons, and keen eyesight. Fifteen species have been recorded in Kentucky.

- White-tailed kite, Elanus leucurus (A)
- Swallow-tailed kite, Elanoides forficatus (A) (E)
- Golden eagle, Aquila chrysaetos
- Northern harrier, Circus hudsonius
- Sharp-shinned hawk, Accipiter striatus
- Cooper's hawk, Accipiter cooperii
- American goshawk, Accipiter atricapillus (A)
- Bald eagle, Haliaeetus leucocephalus
- Mississippi kite, Ictinia mississippiensis
- Red-shouldered hawk, Buteo lineatus
- Broad-winged hawk, Buteo platypterus
- Swainson's hawk, Buteo swainsoni (A)
- Red-tailed hawk, Buteo jamaicensis
- Rough-legged hawk, Buteo lagopus
- Ferruginous hawk, Buteo regalis (A)

== Barn-owls ==
Order: Strigiformes Family: Tytonidae

Barn-owls are medium to large owls with large heads and characteristic heart-shaped faces. They have long strong legs with powerful talons. One species has been recorded in Kentucky.

- Barn owl, Tyto alba

== Owls ==
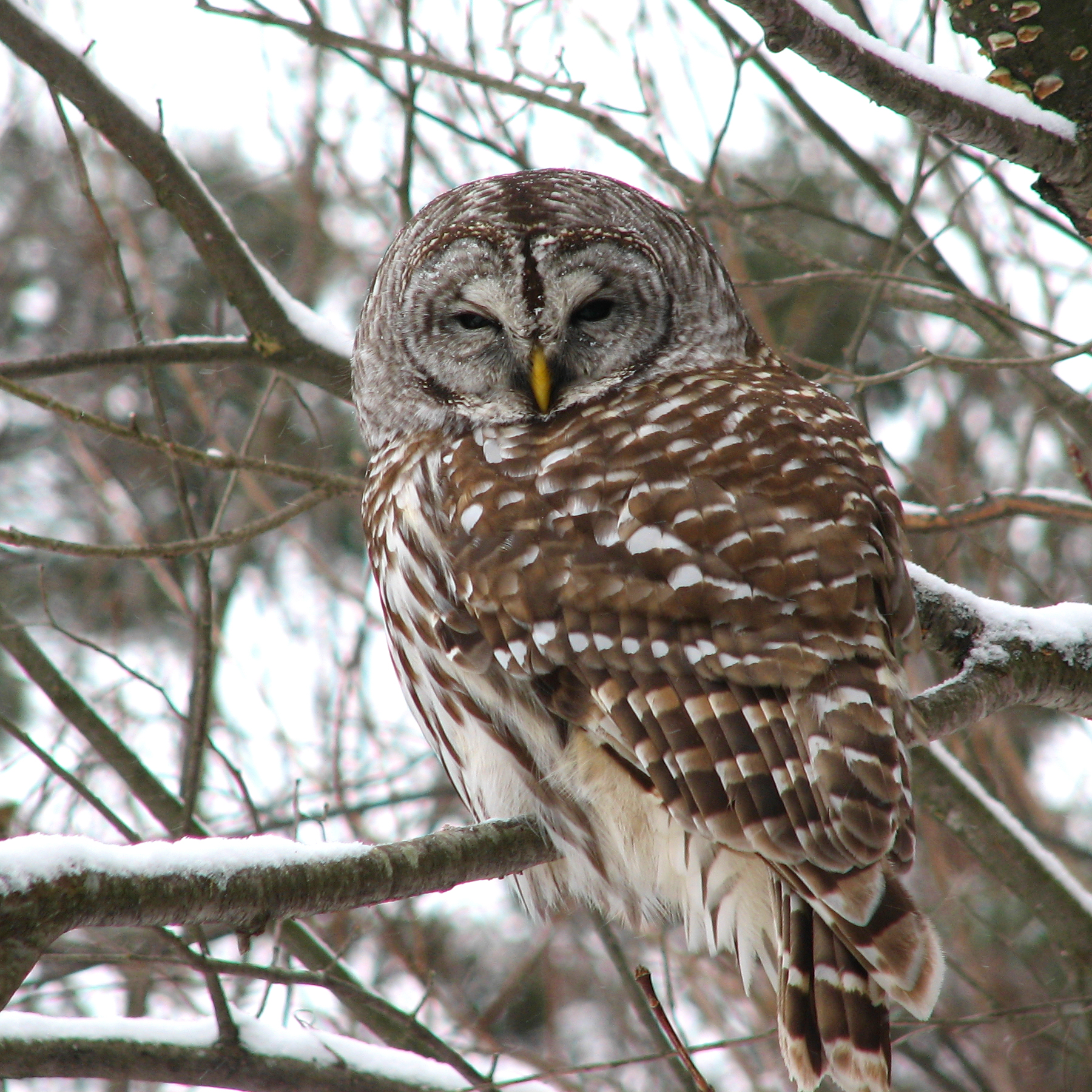
Barred owl

Order: Strigiformes Family: Strigidae

Typical owls are small to large solitary nocturnal birds of prey. They have large forward-facing eyes and ears, a hawk-like beak, and a conspicuous circle of feathers around each eye called a facial disk. Eight species have been recorded in Kentucky.

- Eastern screech-owl, Megascops asio
- Great horned owl, Bubo virginianus
- Snowy owl, Bubo scandiacus (A)
- Burrowing owl, Athene cunicularia (A)
- Barred owl, Strix varia
- Long-eared owl, Asio otus
- Short-eared owl, Asio flammeus
- Northern saw-whet owl, Aegolius acadicus

== Kingfishers ==
Order: Coraciiformes Family: Alcedinidae

Kingfishers are medium-sized birds with large heads, long, pointed bills, short legs, and stubby tails. One species has been recorded in Kentucky.

- Belted kingfisher, Megaceryle alcyon

== Woodpeckers ==
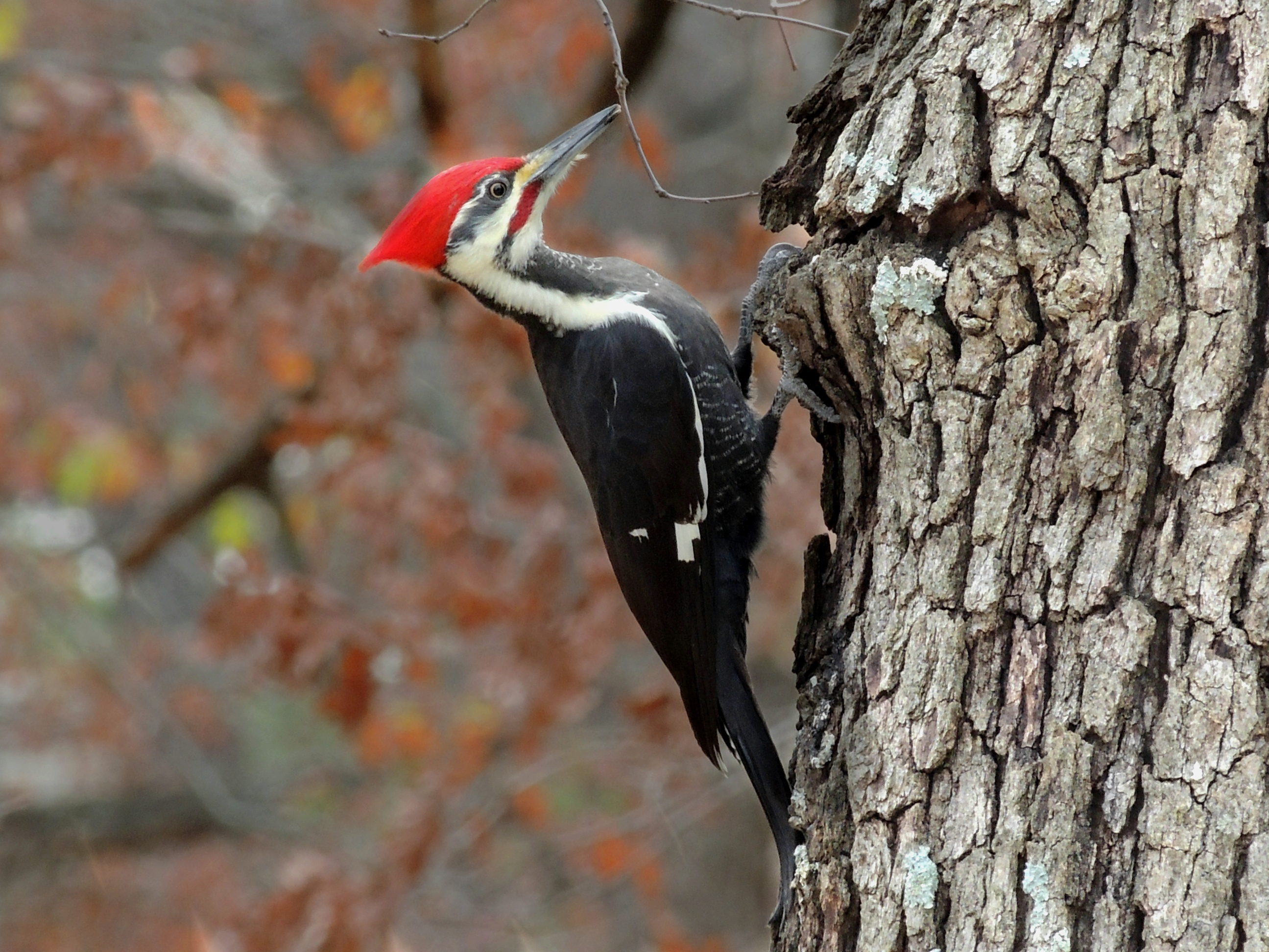
Pileated woodpecker

Order: Piciformes Family: Picidae

Woodpeckers are small to medium-sized birds with chisel-like beaks, short legs, stiff tails, and long tongues used for capturing insects. Some species have feet with two toes pointing forward and two backward, while several species have only three toes. Many woodpeckers have the habit of tapping noisily on tree trunks with their beaks. Nine species have been recorded in Kentucky.

- Red-headed woodpecker, Melanerpes erythrocephalus
- Red-bellied woodpecker, Melanerpes carolinus
- Yellow-bellied sapsucker, Sphyrapicus varius
- Downy woodpecker, Dryobates pubescens
- Red-cockaded woodpecker, Dryobates borealis (E)
- Hairy woodpecker, Dryobates villosus
- Northern flicker, Colaptes auratus
- Pileated woodpecker, Dryocopus pileatus
- Ivory-billed woodpecker, Campephilus principalis (X)

== Falcons and caracaras ==
Order: Falconiformes Family: Falconidae

Falconidae is a family of diurnal birds of prey, notably the falcons and caracaras. They differ from hawks, eagles, and kites in that they kill with their beaks instead of their talons. Four species have been recorded in Kentucky.

- American kestrel, Falco sparverius
- Merlin, Falco columbarius
- Peregrine falcon, Falco peregrinus
- Prairie falcon, Falco mexicanus (A)

== New World and African parrots ==
Order: Psittaciformes Family: Psittacidae

Parrots are small to large birds with a characteristic curved beak. Their upper mandibles have slight mobility in the joint with the skull and they have a generally erect stance. All parrots are zygodactyl, having the four toes on each foot placed two at the front and two to the back. Most of the more than 150 species in this family are found in the New World. One species has been recorded in Kentucky.

- Carolina parakeet, Conuropsis carolinensis (X)

== Tyrant flycatchers ==
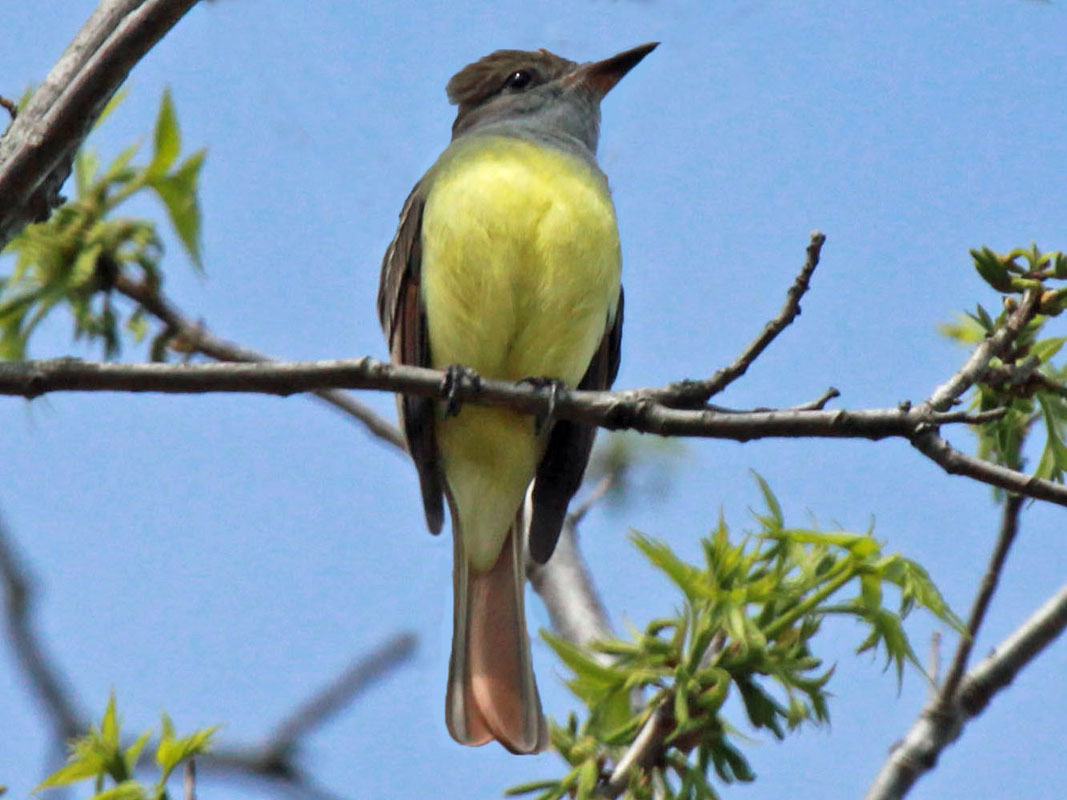
Great crested flycatcher

Order: Passeriformes Family: Tyrannidae

Tyrant flycatchers are Passerine birds which occur throughout North and South America. They superficially resemble the Old World flycatchers, but are more robust and have stronger bills. They do not have the sophisticated vocal capabilities of the songbirds. Most, but not all, are rather plain. As the name implies, most are insectivorous. Seventeen species have been recorded in Kentucky.

- Ash-throated flycatcher, Myiarchus cinerascens (A)
- Great crested flycatcher, Myiarchus crinitus
- Western kingbird, Tyrannus verticalis (A)
- Eastern kingbird, Tyrannus tyrannus
- Gray kingbird, Tyrannus dominicensis (A)
- Scissor-tailed flycatcher, Tyrannus forficatus
- Fork-tailed flycatcher, Tyrannus savana (H)
- Olive-sided flycatcher, Contopus cooperi
- Eastern wood-pewee, Contopus virens
- Yellow-bellied flycatcher, Empidonax flaviventris
- Acadian flycatcher, Empidonax virescens
- Alder flycatcher, Empidonax alnorum
- Willow flycatcher, Empidonax traillii
- Least flycatcher, Empidonax minimus
- Eastern phoebe, Sayornis phoebe
- Say's phoebe, Sayornis saya (A)
- Vermilion flycatcher, Pyrocephalus rubinus (A)

== Vireos, shrike-babblers, and erpornis ==
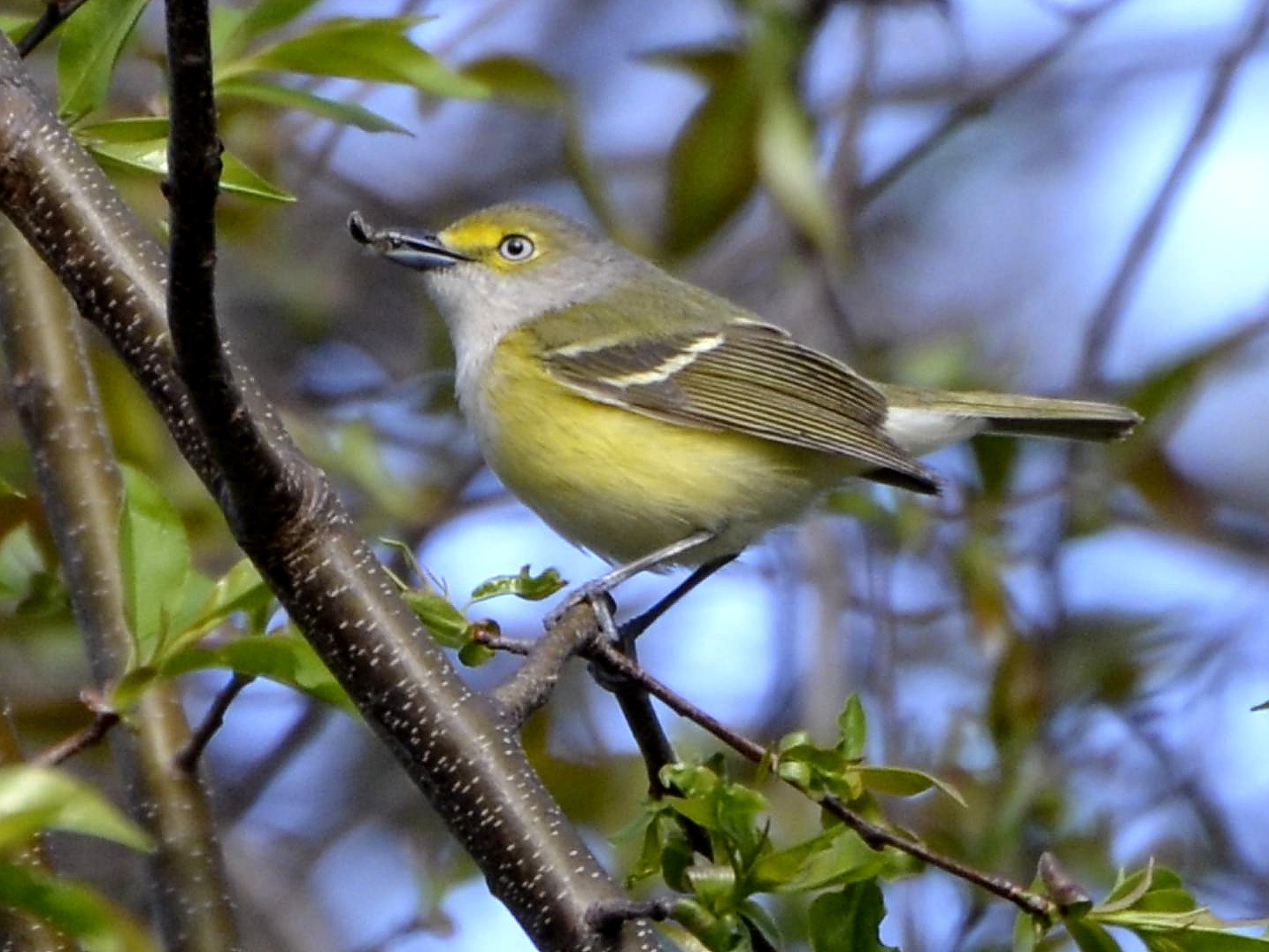
White-eyed vireo

Order: Passeriformes Family: Vireonidae

The vireos are a group of small to medium-sized passerine birds. They are typically greenish in color and resemble wood-warblers apart from their heavier bills. Seven species have been recorded in Kentucky.

- White-eyed vireo, Vireo griseus
- Bell's vireo, Vireo bellii
- Yellow-throated vireo, Vireo flavifrons
- Blue-headed vireo, Vireo solitarius
- Philadelphia vireo, Vireo philadelphicus
- Warbling vireo, Vireo gilvus
- Red-eyed vireo, Vireo olivaceus

== Shrikes ==
Order: Passeriformes Family: Laniidae

Shrikes are passerine birds known for their habit of catching other birds and small animals and impaling the uneaten portions of their bodies on thorns. A shrike's beak is hooked, like that of a typical bird of prey. Two species have been recorded in Kentucky.

- Loggerhead shrike, Lanius ludovicianus
- Northern shrike, Lanius borealis (A)

== Crows, jays, and magpies ==
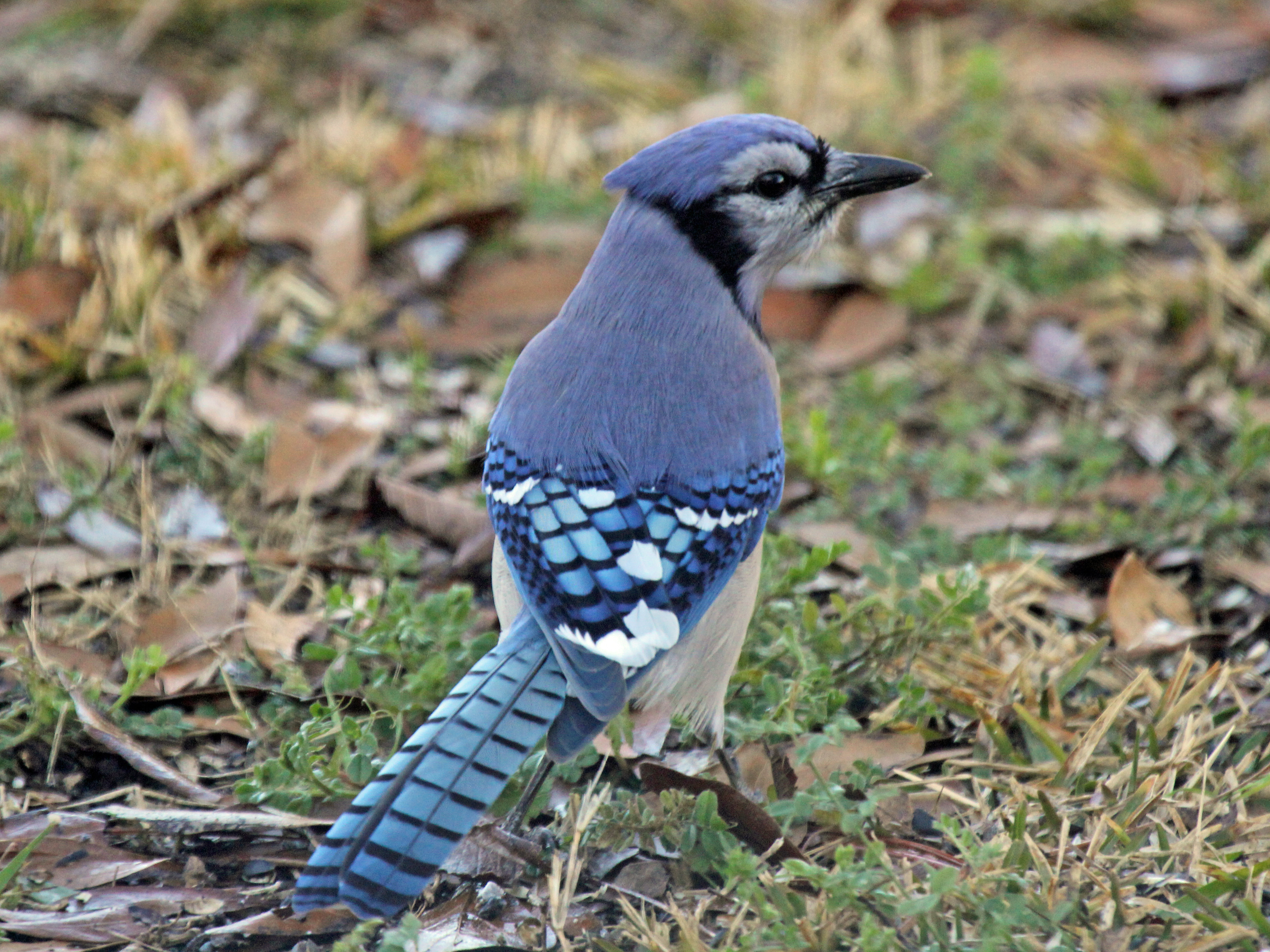
Blue jay

Order: Passeriformes Family: Corvidae

The family Corvidae includes crows, ravens, jays, choughs, magpies, treepies, nutcrackers, and ground jays. Corvids are above average in size among the Passeriformes, and some of the larger species show high levels of intelligence. Four species have been recorded in Kentucky.

- Blue jay, Cyanocitta cristata
- American crow, Corvus brachyrhynchos
- Fish crow, Corvus ossifragus
- Common raven, Corvus corax

== Tits, chickadees, and titmice ==
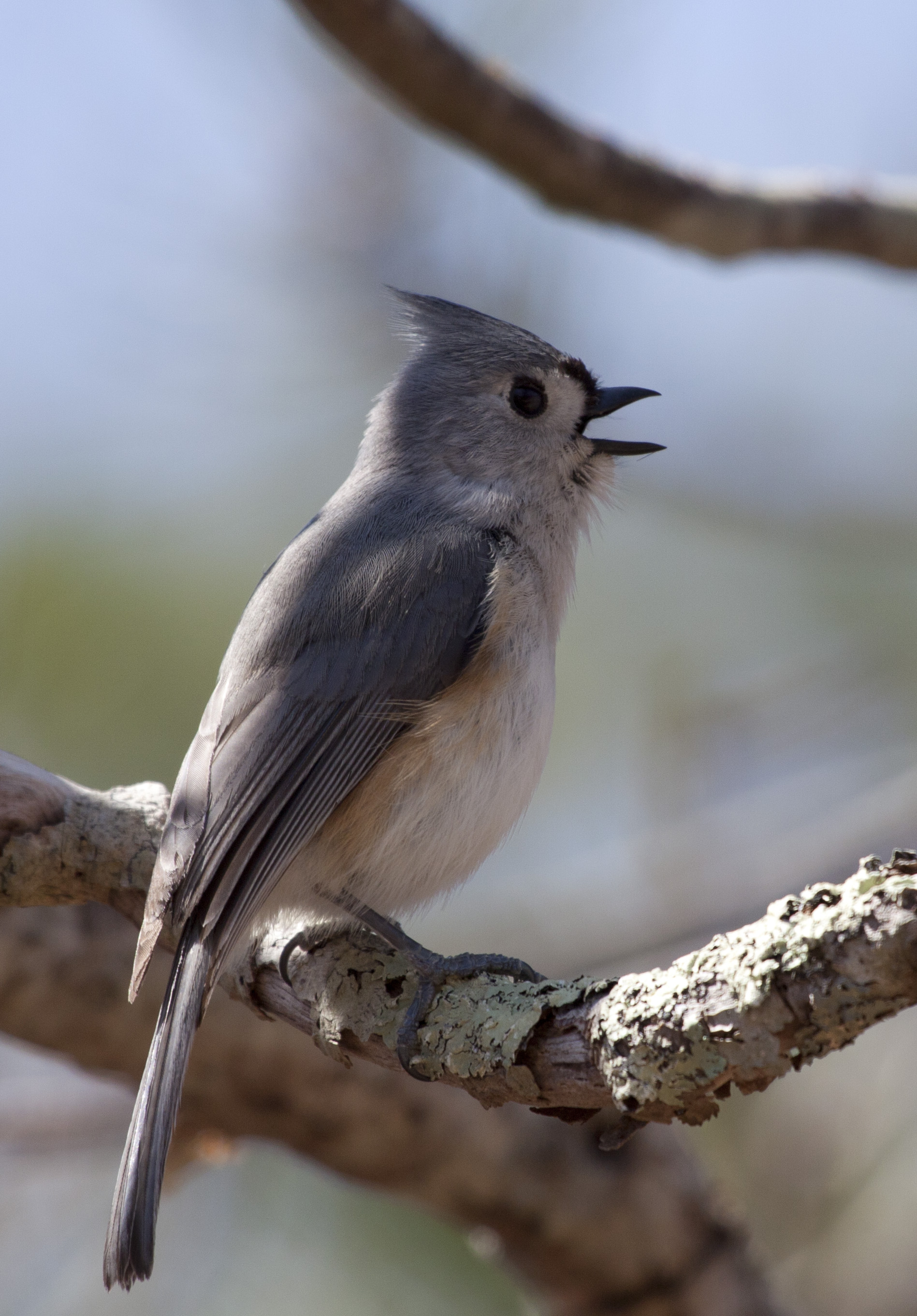
Tufted titmouse

Order: Passeriformes Family: Paridae

The Paridae are mainly small stocky woodland species with short stout bills. Some have crests. They are adaptable birds, with a mixed diet including seeds and insects. Three species have been recorded in Kentucky.

- Carolina chickadee, Poecile carolinensis
- Black-capped chickadee, Poecile atricapilla (A)
- Tufted titmouse, Baeolophus bicolor

== Larks ==
Order: Passeriformes Family: Alaudidae

Larks are small terrestrial birds with often extravagant songs and display flights. Most larks are fairly dull in appearance. Their food is insects and seeds. One species has been recorded in Kentucky.

- Horned lark, Eremophila alpestris

== Swallows ==
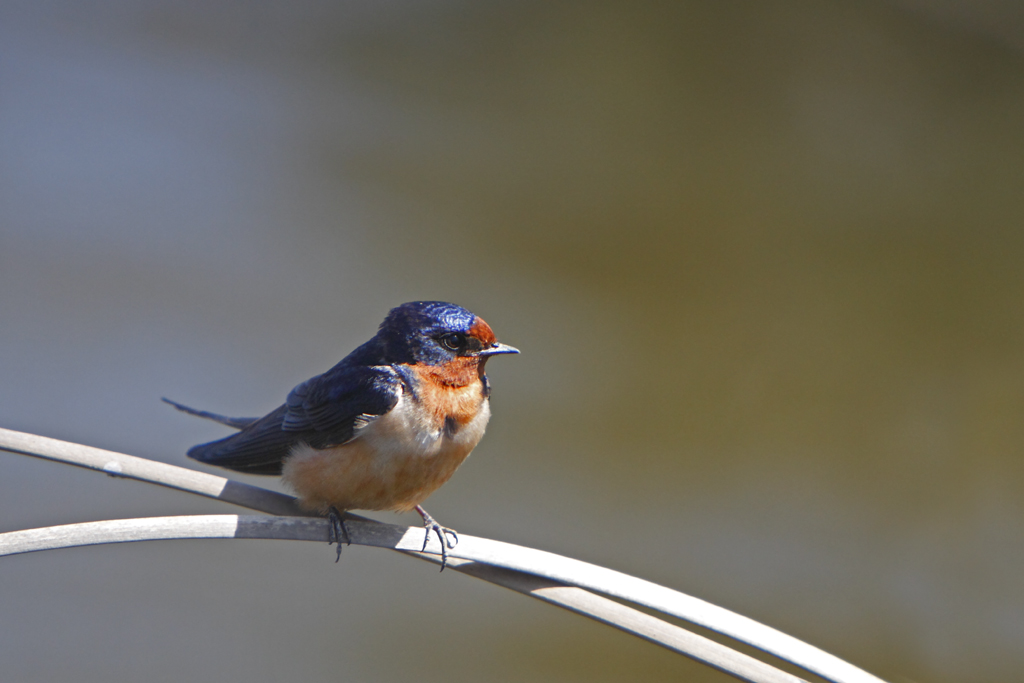
Barn swallow

Order: Passeriformes Family: Hirundinidae

The family Hirundinidae is adapted to aerial feeding. They have a slender streamlined body, long pointed wings, and a short bill with a wide gape. The feet are adapted to perching rather than walking, and the front toes are partially joined at the base. Seven species have been recorded in Kentucky.

- Bank swallow, Riparia riparia
- Tree swallow, Tachycineta bicolor
- Northern rough-winged swallow, Stelgidopteryx serripennis
- Purple martin, Progne subis
- Barn swallow, Hirundo rustica
- Cliff swallow, Petrochelidon pyrrhonota
- Cave swallow, Petrochelidon fulva (A)

== Kinglets ==
Order: Passeriformes Family: Regulidae

The kinglets are a small family of birds which resemble the titmice. They are very small insectivorous birds. The adults have colored crowns, giving rise to their names. Two species have been recorded in Kentucky.

- Ruby-crowned kinglet, Corthylio calendula
- Golden-crowned kinglet, Regulus satrapa

== Waxwings ==
Order: Passeriformes Family: Bombycillidae

The waxwings are a group of passerine birds with soft silky plumage and unique red tips to some of the wing feathers. In the Bohemian and cedar waxwings, these tips look like sealing wax and give the group its name. These are arboreal birds of northern forests. They live on insects in summer and berries in winter. One species has been recorded in Kentucky.

- Cedar waxwing, Bombycilla cedrorum

== Nuthatches ==
Order: Passeriformes Family: Sittidae

Nuthatches are small woodland birds. They have the unusual ability to climb down trees head first, unlike other birds which can only go upwards. Nuthatches have big heads, short tails, and powerful bills and feet. Three species have been recorded in Kentucky.

- Red-breasted nuthatch, Sitta canadensis
- White-breasted nuthatch, Sitta carolinensis
- Brown-headed nuthatch, Sitta pusilla (A) (if outside Land Between the Lakes or London areas)

== Treecreepers ==
Order: Passeriformes Family: Certhiidae

Treecreepers are small woodland birds, brown above and white below. They have thin pointed down-curved bills, which they use to extricate insects from bark. They have stiff tail feathers, like woodpeckers, which they use to support themselves on vertical trees. One species has been recorded in Kentucky.

- Brown creeper, Certhia americana

== Gnatcatchers ==
Order: Passeriformes Family: Polioptilidae

These dainty birds resemble Old World warblers in their structure and habits, moving restlessly through the foliage seeking insects. The gnatcatchers are mainly soft bluish gray in color and have the typical insectivore's long sharp bill. Many species have distinctive black head patterns (especially males) and long, regularly cocked, black-and-white tails. One species has been recorded in Kentucky.

- Blue-gray gnatcatcher, Polioptila caerulea

== Wrens ==
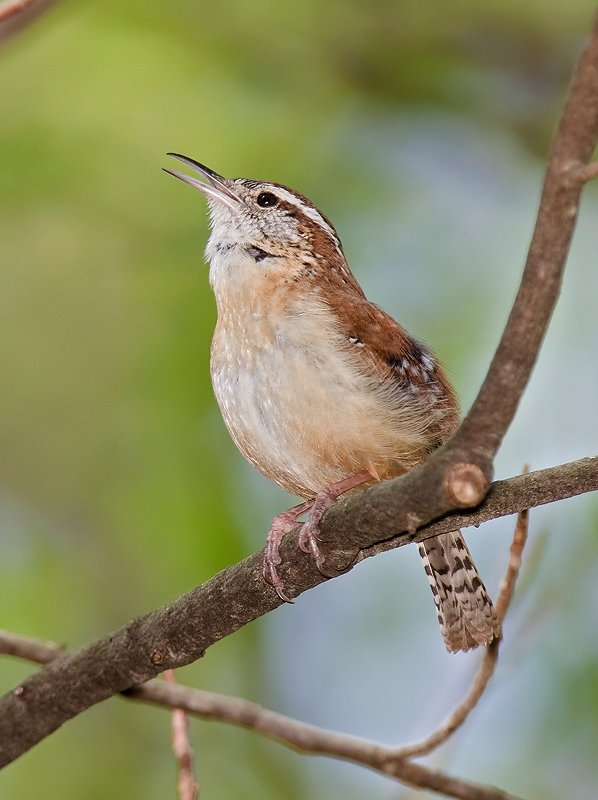
Carolina wren

Order: Passeriformes Family: Troglodytidae

Wrens are small and inconspicuous birds, except for their loud songs. They have short wings and thin down-turned bills. Several species often hold their tails upright. All are insectivorous. Seven species have been recorded in Kentucky.

- Rock wren, Salpinctes obsoletus (A)
- House wren, Troglodytes aedon
- Winter wren, Troglodytes hiemalis
- Sedge wren, Cistothorus platensis
- Marsh wren, Cistothorus palustris
- Carolina wren, Thryothorus ludovicianus
- Bewick's wren, Thryomanes bewickii (A)

== Mockingbirds and thrashers ==
Order: Passeriformes Family: Mimidae

The mimids are a family of passerine birds which includes thrashers, mockingbirds, tremblers and the New World catbirds. These birds are notable for their vocalization, especially their remarkable ability to mimic a wide variety of birds and other sounds heard outdoors. The species tend towards dull grays and browns in their appearance. Three species have been recorded in Kentucky.

- Gray catbird, Dumetella carolinensis
- Brown thrasher, Toxostoma rufum
- Northern mockingbird, Mimus polyglottos

== Starlings ==
Order: Passeriformes Family: Sturnidae

Starlings are small to medium-sized passerine birds. They are medium-sized passerines with strong feet. Their flight is strong and direct and they are very gregarious. Their preferred habitat is fairly open country, and they eat insects and fruit. Plumage is typically dark with a metallic sheen. One species has been recorded in Kentucky.

- European starling, Sturnus vulgaris (I)

== Thrushes and allies ==
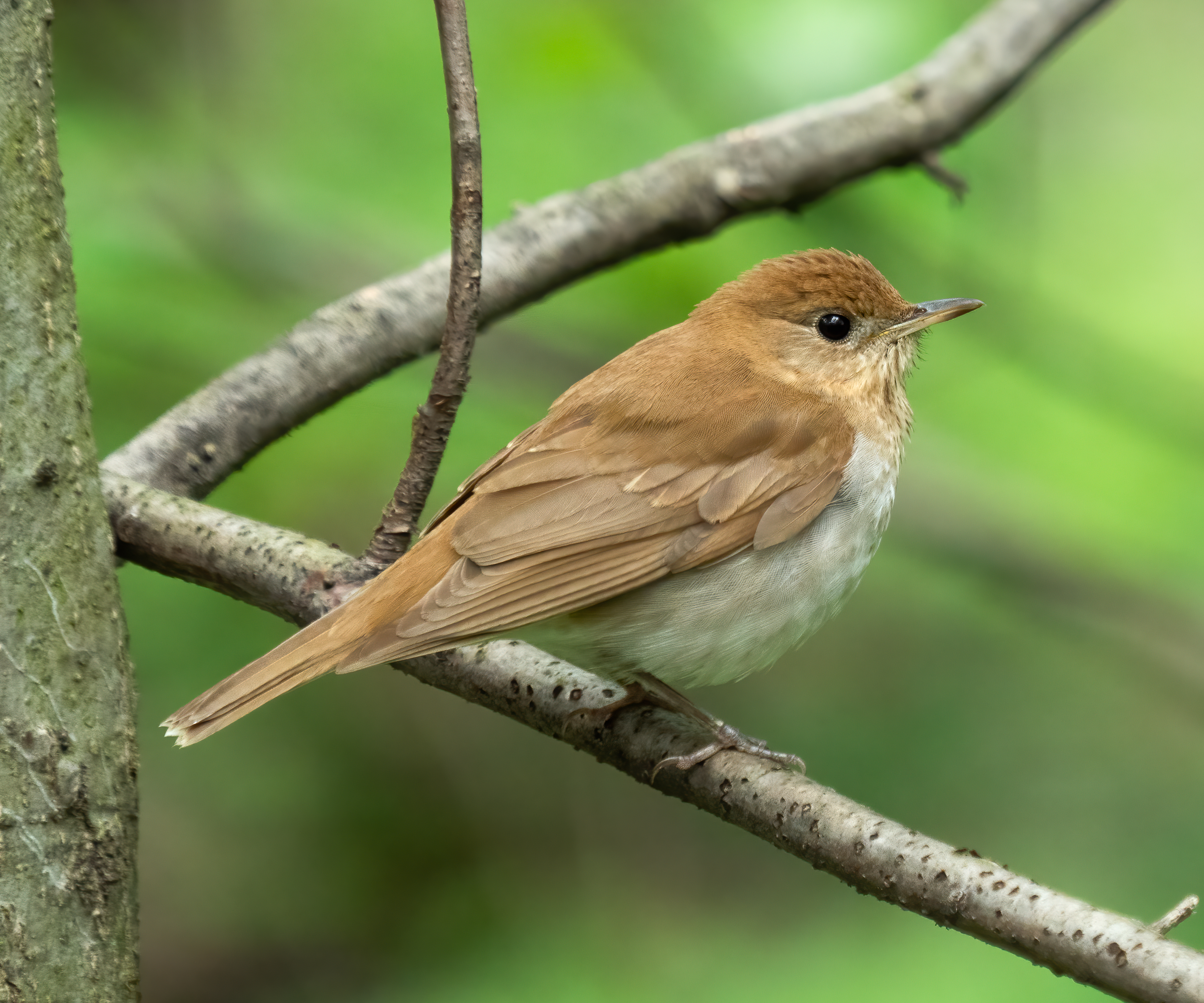
Veery

Order: Passeriformes Family: Turdidae

The thrushes are a group of passerine birds that occur mainly but not exclusively in the Old World. They are plump, soft plumaged, small to medium-sized insectivores or sometimes omnivores, often feeding on the ground. Nine species have been recorded in Kentucky.

- Eastern bluebird, Sialia sialis
- Mountain bluebird, Sialia currucoides (A)
- Veery, Catharus fuscescens
- Gray-cheeked thrush, Catharus minimus
- Swainson's thrush, Catharus ustulatus
- Hermit thrush, Catharus guttatus
- Wood thrush, Hylocichla mustelina
- American robin, Turdus migratorius
- Varied thrush, Ixoreus naevius (A)

== Old World sparrows ==
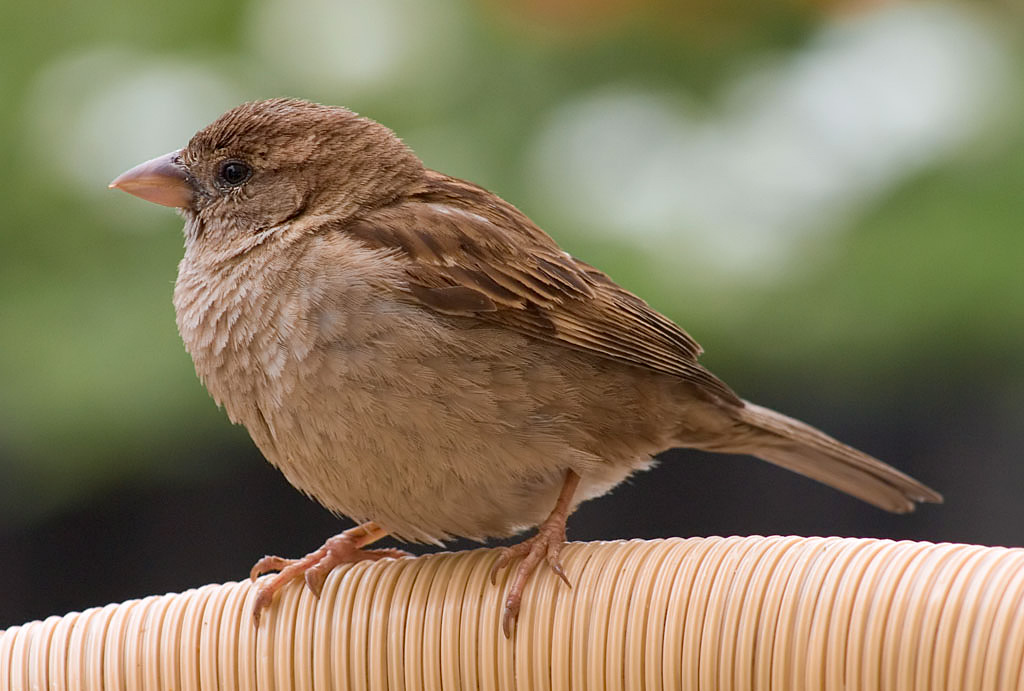
House sparrow

Order: Passeriformes Family: Passeridae

Old World sparrows are small passerine birds. In general, sparrows tend to be small plump brownish or grayish birds with short tails and short powerful beaks. Sparrows are seed eaters, but they also consume small insects. Two species have been recorded in Kentucky.

- House sparrow, Passer domesticus (I)
- Eurasian tree sparrow, Passer montanus (I) (A)

== Wagtails and pipits ==
Order: Passeriformes Family: Motacillidae

Motacillidae is a family of small passerine birds with medium to long tails. They include the wagtails, longclaws, and pipits. They are slender ground-feeding insectivores of open country. Two species have been recorded in Kentucky.

- American pipit, Anthus rubescens
- Sprague's pipit, Anthus spragueii (H)

== Finches, euphonias, and allies ==
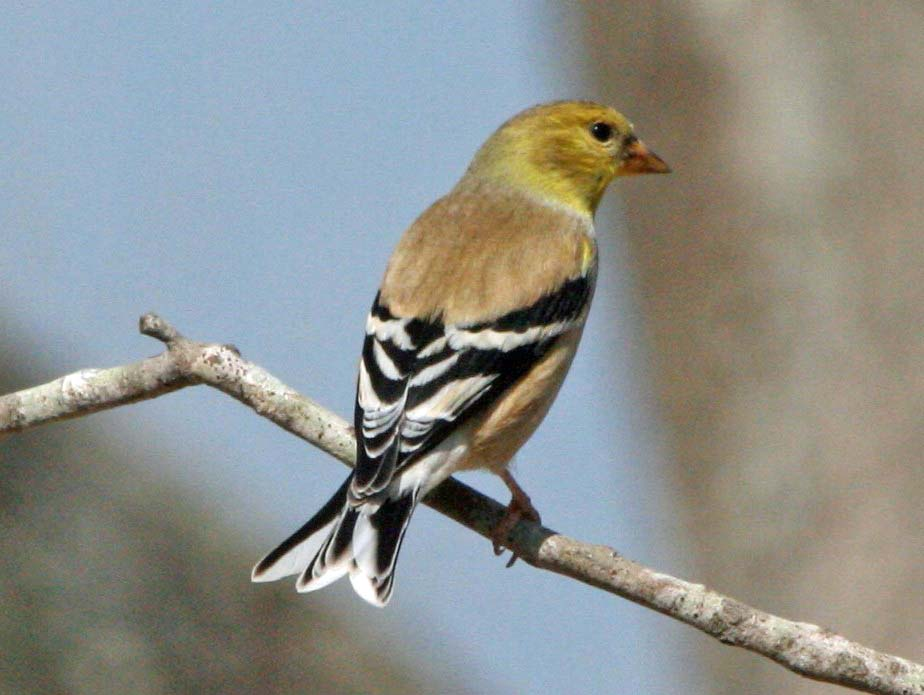
American goldfinch

Order: Passeriformes Family: Fringillidae

Finches are seed-eating passerine birds, that are small to moderately large and have a strong beak, usually conical and in some species very large. All have twelve tail feathers and nine primaries. These birds have a bouncing flight with alternating bouts of flapping and gliding on closed wings, and most sing well. Ten species have been recorded in Kentucky.

- Evening grosbeak, Coccothraustes vespertinus (A)
- Pine grosbeak, Pinicola enucleator (H)
- House finch, Haemorhous mexicanus (Native to the southwestern U.S.; introduced in the east)
- Purple finch, Haemorhous purpureus
- Common redpoll, Acanthis flammea (A)
- Red crossbill, Loxia curvirostra (A)
- White-winged crossbill, Loxia leucoptera (A)
- Pine siskin, Spinus pinus
- Lesser goldfinch, Spinus psaltria (A)
- American goldfinch, Spinus tristis

== Longspurs and snow buntings ==
Order: Passeriformes Family: Calcariidae

The Calcariidae are a group of passerine birds that have been traditionally grouped with the New World sparrows but differ in a number of respects and are usually found in open grassy areas. Three species have been recorded in Kentucky.

- Lapland longspur, Calcarius lapponicus
- Smith's longspur, Calcarius pictus (A)
- Snow bunting, Plectrophenax nivalis

== New World sparrows ==
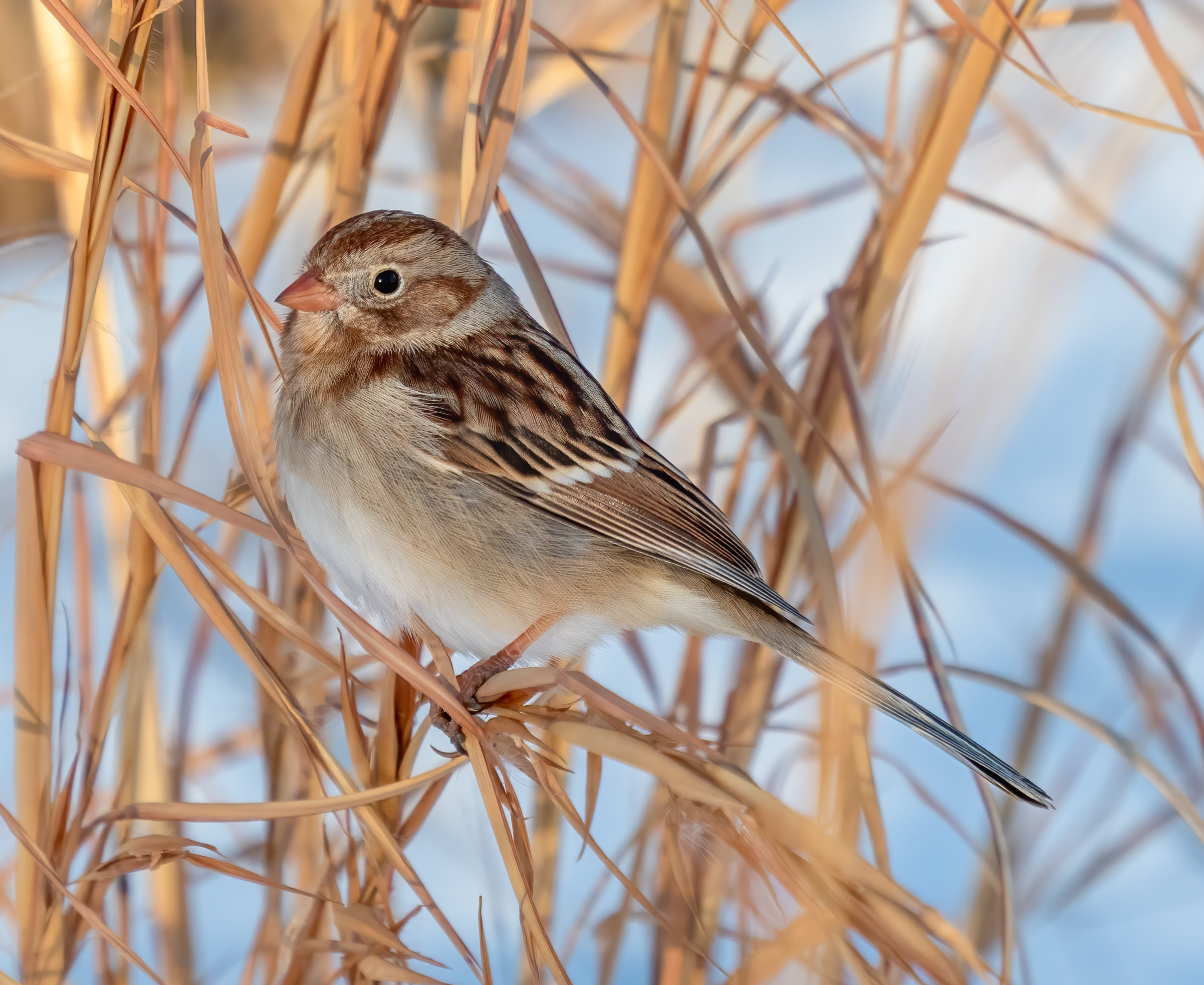
Field sparrow

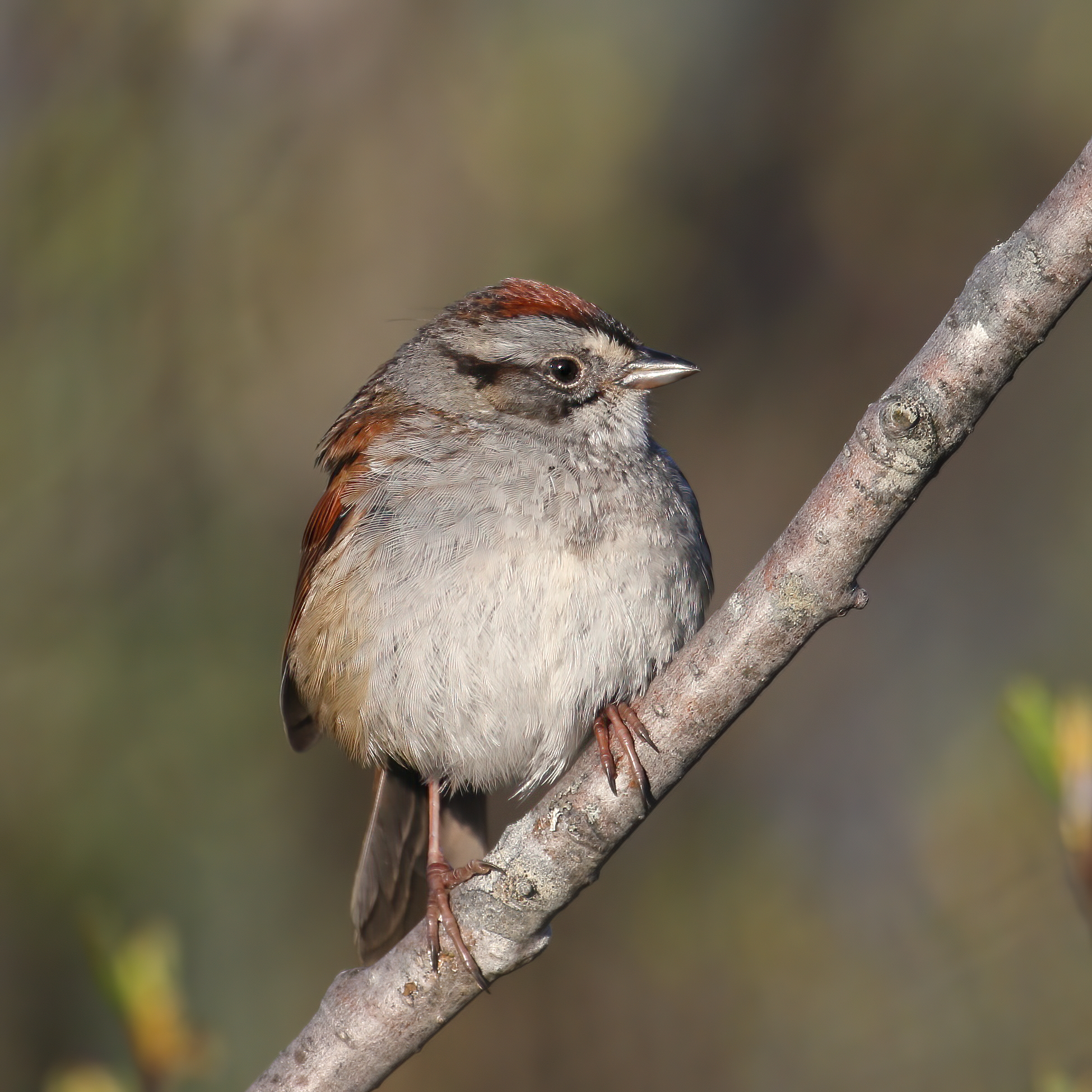
Swamp sparrow

Order: Passeriformes Family: Passerellidae

Until 2017, these species were considered part of the family Emberizidae. Most of the species are known as sparrows, but these birds are not closely related to the Old World sparrows which are in the family Passeridae. Many of these have distinctive head patterns. Twenty-six species have been recorded in Kentucky.

- Bachman's sparrow, Peucaea aestivalis (A) (if outside Fort Campbell)
- Grasshopper sparrow, Ammodramus savannarum
- Lark sparrow, Chondestes grammacus
- Lark bunting, Calamospiza melanocorys (A)
- Chipping sparrow, Spizella passerina
- Clay-colored sparrow, Spizella pallida
- Field sparrow, Spizella pusilla
- Brewer's sparrow, Spizella breweri (A)
- Fox sparrow, Passerella iliaca
- American tree sparrow, Spizelloides arborea
- Dark-eyed junco, Junco hyemalis
- White-crowned sparrow, Zonotrichia leucophrys
- Harris's sparrow, Zonotrichia querula (A)
- White-throated sparrow, Zonotrichia albicollis
- Sagebrush sparrow, Artemisiospiza nevadensis (A)
- Vesper sparrow, Pooecetes gramineus
- LeConte's sparrow, Ammospiza leconteii
- Nelson's sparrow, Ammospiza nelsoni (A) (if outside fall migratory period)
- Henslow's sparrow, Centronyx henslowii
- Savannah sparrow, Passerculus sandwichensis
- Song sparrow, Melospiza melodia
- Lincoln's sparrow, Melospiza lincolnii
- Swamp sparrow, Melospiza georgiana
- Green-tailed towhee, Pipilo chlorurus (A)
- Spotted towhee, Pipilo maculatus (A)
- Eastern towhee, Pipilo erythrophthalmus

== Yellow-breasted chat ==
Order: Passeriformes Family: Icteriidae

This species was historically placed in the wood-warblers (Parulidae) but nonetheless most authorities were unsure if it belonged there. It was placed in its own family in 2017.

- Yellow-breasted chat, Icteria virens

== Troupials and allies ==
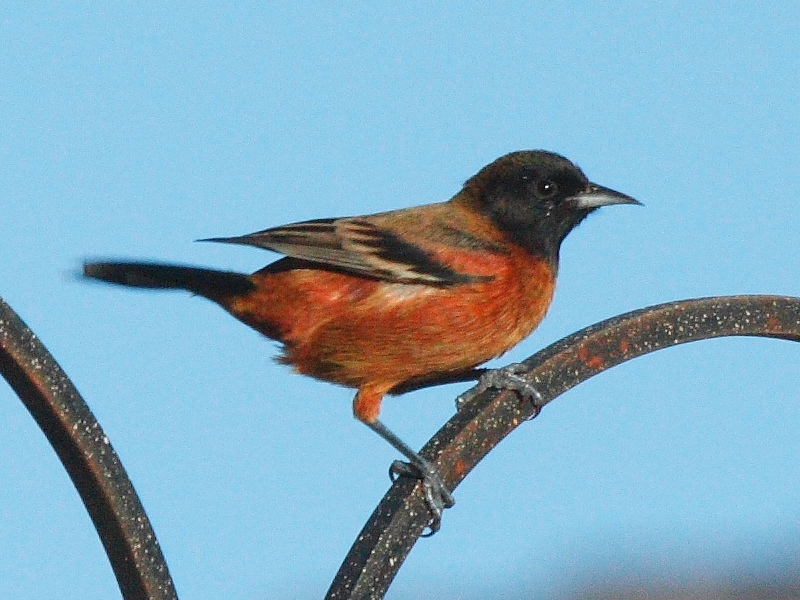
Orchard oriole

Order: Passeriformes Family: Icteridae

The icterids are a group of small to medium-sized, often colorful passerine birds restricted to the New World and include the grackles, New World blackbirds, and New World orioles. Most species have black as a predominant plumage color, often enlivened by yellow, orange, or red. Fourteen species have been recorded in Kentucky.

- Yellow-headed blackbird, Xanthocephalus xanthocephalus (A)
- Bobolink, Dolichonyx oryzivorus
- Eastern meadowlark, Sturnella magna
- Western meadowlark, Sturnella neglecta
- Orchard oriole, Icterus spurius
- Hooded oriole, Icterus cucullatus (A)
- Bullock's oriole, Icterus bullockii (A)
- Baltimore oriole, Icterus galbula
- Scott's oriole, Icterus parisorum (A)
- Red-winged blackbird, Agelaius phoen ater
- Brown-headed cowbird, Molothrus ater
- Rusty blackbird, Euphagus carolinus
- Brewer's blackbird, Euphagus cyanocephalus
- Common grackle, Quiscalus quiscula

== New World warblers ==
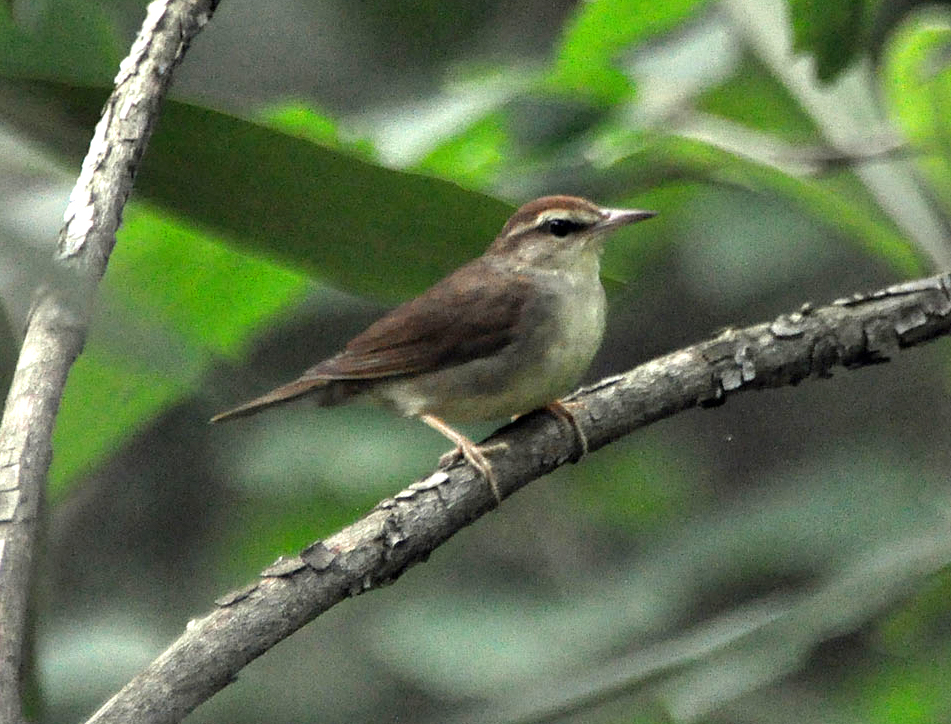
Swainson's warbler

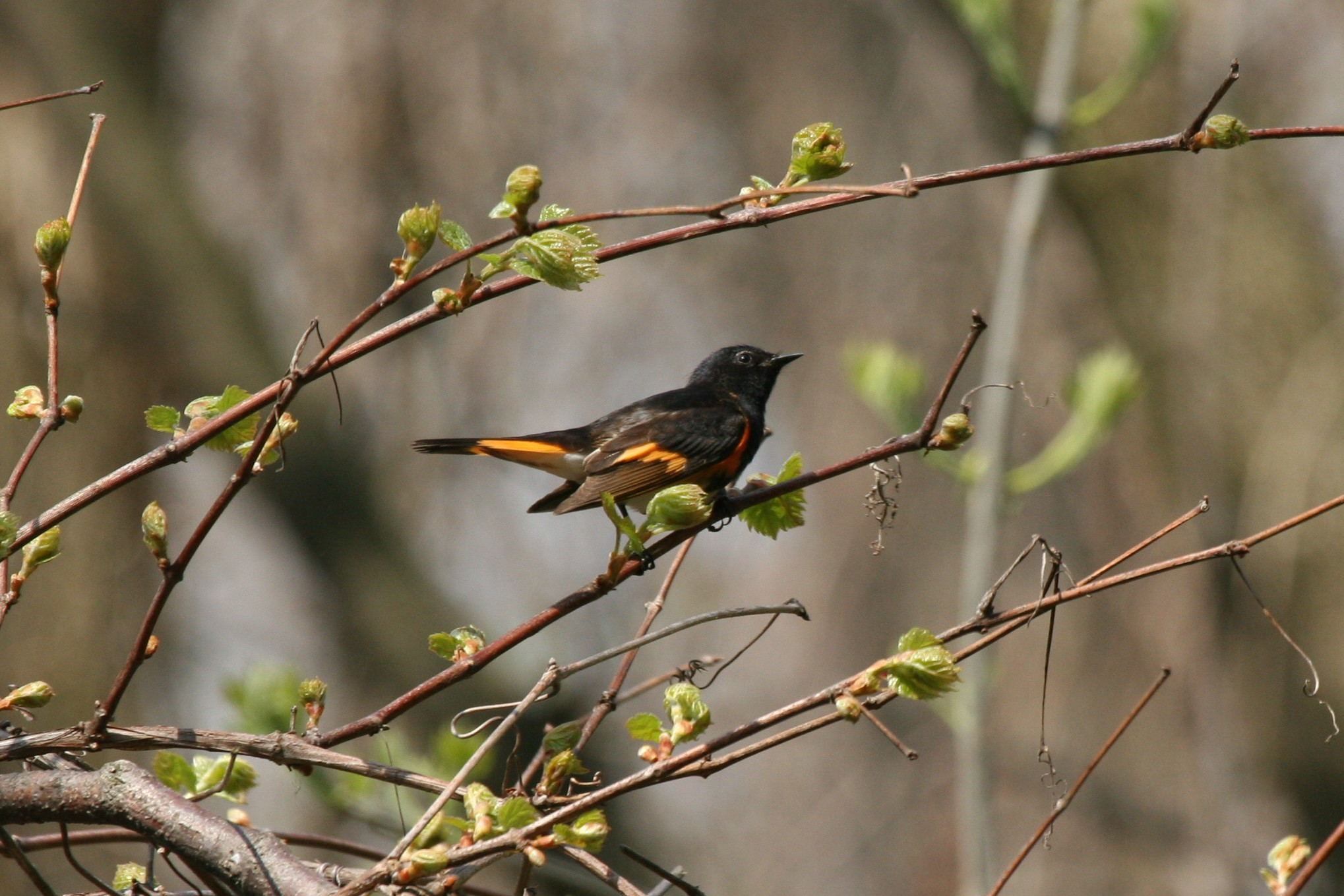
American redstart

Order: Passeriformes Family: Parulidae

The wood-warblers are a group of small and often colorful passerine birds restricted to the New World. Most are arboreal, but some, like the ovenbird and the two waterthrushes, are more terrestrial. Most members of this family are insectivores. Thirty-nine species have been recorded in Kentucky.

- Ovenbird, Seiurus aurocapilla
- Worm-eating warbler, Helmitheros vermivorus
- Louisiana waterthrush, Parkesia motacilla
- Northern waterthrush, Parkesia noveboracensis
- Bachman's warbler, Vermivora bachmanii (X)
- Golden-winged warbler, Vermivora chrysoptera
- Blue-winged warbler, Vermivora cyanoptera
- Black-and-white warbler, Mniotilta varia
- Prothonotary warbler, Protonotaria citrea
- Swainson's warbler, Limnothlypis swainsonii
- Tennessee warbler, Leiothlypis peregrina
- Orange-crowned warbler, Leiothlypis celata
- Nashville warbler, Leiothlypis ruficapilla
- Connecticut warbler, Oporornis agilis
- Mourning warbler, Geothlypis philadelphia
- Kentucky warbler, Geothlypis formosa
- Common yellowthroat, Geothlypis trichas
- Hooded warbler, Setophaga citrina
- American redstart, Setophaga ruticilla
- Kirtland's warbler, Setophaga kirtlandii (H)
- Cape May warbler, Setophaga tigrina
- Cerulean warbler, Setophaga cerulea
- Northern parula, Setophaga americana
- Magnolia warbler, Setophaga magnolia
- Bay-breasted warbler, Setophaga castanea
- Blackburnian warbler, Setophaga fusca
- Yellow warbler, Setophaga petechia
- Chestnut-sided warbler, Setophaga pensylvanica
- Blackpoll warbler, Setophaga striata
- Black-throated blue warbler, Setophaga caerulescens
- Palm warbler, Setophaga palmarum
- Pine warbler, Setophaga pinus
- Yellow-rumped warbler, Setophaga coronata
- Yellow-throated warbler, Setophaga dominica
- Prairie warbler, Setophaga discolor
- Black-throated gray warbler, Setophaga nigrescens (A)
- Black-throated green warbler, Setophaga virens
- Canada warbler, Cardellina canadensis
- Wilson's warbler, Cardellina pusilla

== Cardinals and allies ==
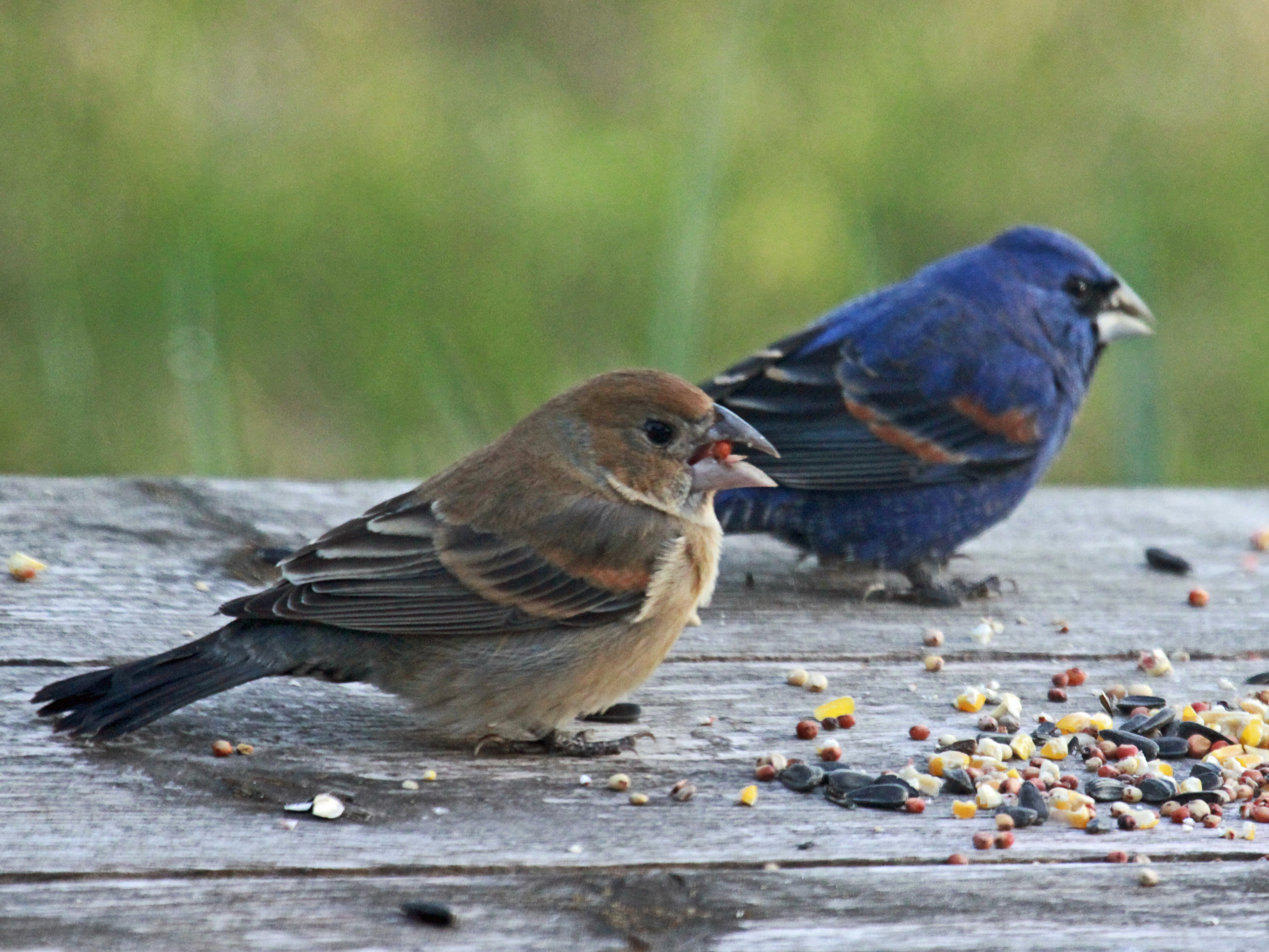
Blue grosbeak

Order: Passeriformes Family: Cardinalidae

The cardinals are a family of robust, seed-eating birds with strong bills. They are typically associated with open woodland. The sexes usually have distinct plumages. Ten species have been recorded in Kentucky.

- Summer tanager, Piranga rubra
- Scarlet tanager, Piranga olivacea
- Western tanager, Piranga ludoviciana (A)
- Northern cardinal, Cardinalis cardinalis
- Rose-breasted grosbeak, Pheucticus ludovicianus
- Black-headed grosbeak, Pheucticus melanocephalus (A)
- Blue grosbeak, Passerina caerulea
- Indigo bunting, Passerina cyanea
- Painted bunting, Passerina ciris (A)
- Dickcissel, Spiza americana

== See also ==
- List of birds
- Lists of birds by region
- List of North American birds
