= Lists of birds by region =

The following are the regional bird lists by continent. For another list see Category:Lists of birds by location

== Africa ==
=== Northern Africa ===
- Algeria
- Egypt
- Libya
- Morocco
- Sudan
- Tunisia
- Western Sahara
- Canary Islands (ES)
- Madeira (PT)

=== Horn of Africa ===
- Djibouti
- Eritrea
- Ethiopia
- Somalia

=== Eastern Africa ===
- Burundi
- Comoros
- Kenya
- Madagascar
- Malawi
- Mauritius
- Mayotte (FR)
- Mozambique
- Réunion (FR)
- Rwanda
- Seychelles
- South Sudan
- Uganda
- Tanzania
- Zambia
- Zimbabwe

=== Middle Africa ===
- Angola
- Cameroon
- Central African Republic
- Chad
- Republic of the Congo
- Democratic Republic of the Congo
- Equatorial Guinea
- Gabon
- São Tomé and Príncipe

=== Southern Africa ===
- Botswana
- Lesotho
- Namibia
- South Africa
  - Gauteng
- Eswatini

=== Western Africa ===
- Benin
- Burkina Faso
- Cape Verde
- Côte d'Ivoire
- The Gambia
- Ghana
- Guinea
- Guinea-Bissau
- Liberia
- Mali
- Mauritania
- Niger
- Nigeria
  - Rivers State
- Saint Helena (UK)
  - Ascension Island
  - Tristan da Cunha
    - Inaccessible Island
    - Nightingale Islands
    - Gough Island
- Senegal
- Sierra Leone
- Togo

== North America ==
=== Caribbean ===
- Anguilla (UK)
- Antigua and Barbuda
- Bahamas
- Barbados
- Cayman Islands (UK)
- Cuba
- Dominica
- Grenada
- Guadeloupe (FR)
- Hispaniola
  - Dominican Republic
  - Haiti
- Jamaica
- Martinique (FR)
- Montserrat (UK)
- Providencia (Colombia)
- Puerto Rico (US)
  - Vieques (US)
- Saba (NL)
- Saint Barthélemy (FR)
- Sint Eustatius (NL)
- Saint Kitts and Nevis
- Saint Lucia
  - Saint Martin (FR)
  - Sint Maarten (NL)
- Saint Vincent and the Grenadines
- Turks and Caicos Islands (UK)
- British Virgin Islands (UK)
- United States Virgin Islands (US)

=== Central America ===
- Belize
- Costa Rica
- El Salvador
- Guatemala
- Honduras
- Nicaragua
- Panama

=== North America ===
- Bermuda (UK)
- Canada
  - Alberta
  - British Columbia
  - Manitoba
  - New Brunswick
  - Newfoundland and Labrador
  - Northwest Territories
  - Nova Scotia
  - Nunavut
  - Ontario
  - Prince Edward Island
  - Quebec
  - Saskatchewan
  - Yukon
- Greenland (DK)
- Mexico
- Saint Pierre and Miquelon (FR)
- United States of America
  - Alabama
  - Alaska
    - Aleutian Islands
  - Arizona
  - Arkansas
  - California
  - Colorado
  - Connecticut
  - Delaware
  - District of Columbia
  - Florida
  - Georgia
  - Idaho
  - Illinois
  - Indiana
  - Iowa
  - Kansas
  - Kentucky
  - Louisiana
  - Maine
  - Maryland
  - Massachusetts
  - Michigan
  - Minnesota
  - Mississippi
  - Missouri
  - Montana
  - Nebraska
  - Nevada
  - New Hampshire
  - New Jersey
  - New Mexico
  - New York
  - North Carolina
  - North Dakota
  - Ohio
  - Oklahoma
  - Oregon
  - Pennsylvania
  - Rhode Island
  - South Carolina
  - South Dakota
  - Tennessee
  - Texas
  - Utah
  - Vermont
  - Virginia
  - Washington
  - West Virginia
  - Wisconsin
  - Wyoming

== South America ==
- Argentina
- Bolivia
- Brazil
  - Fernando de Noronha
- Chile
  - Juan Fernández Islands
- Colombia
- Ecuador
  - Galápagos Islands
- Falkland Islands (UK)
- French Guiana (FR)
- Guyana
- Paraguay
- Peru
- Suriname
- Uruguay
- Venezuela

=== Caribbean ===
- Aruba (NL)
- Bonaire (NL)
- Curaçao
- Trinidad and Tobago

== Asia ==
=== Central Asia ===
- Kazakhstan
- Kyrgyzstan
- Tajikistan
- Turkmenistan
- Uzbekistan

=== Eastern Asia ===
- China
  - Hong Kong
  - Macau
- Japan
- Korea
  - Korea, DPR
  - Korea, Republic of
- Mongolia
- Taiwan

=== Southeastern Asia ===
- Brunei
- Cambodia
- Indonesia
  - Sumatra
- Laos
- Malaysia
- Myanmar
- Philippines
- Singapore
- Thailand
- Timor-Leste
- Vietnam

=== Southern Asia ===
- Afghanistan
- Bangladesh
- Bhutan
- British Indian Ocean Territory (UK)
- Cocos (Keeling) Islands (AU)
- India
  - Andhra Pradesh
  - Goa
  - Karnataka
  - Kerala
  - Tamil Nadu
  - Telangana
  - Andaman and Nicobar Islands
  - Lakshadweep
- Maldives
- Nepal
- Pakistan
  - Islamabad
- Sri Lanka

=== The Middle East ===
- Armenia
- Azerbaijan
- Bahrain
- Cyprus
- Georgia
- Iran
- Iraq
- Israel
- Jordan
- Kuwait
- Lebanon
- Oman
- Palestine
- Qatar
- Saudi Arabia
- Syria
- Turkey
- United Arab Emirates
- Yemen

== Europe ==
=== Eastern Europe ===
- Belarus
- Czech Republic
- Hungary
- Poland
- Russia
- Slovakia
- Ukraine

=== Northern Europe ===
- Denmark
- Estonia
- Faroe Islands (DK)
- Finland
- Iceland
- Ireland
- Latvia
- Lithuania
- Norway
  - Svalbard
- Sweden
- United Kingdom
  - England
  - Scotland
  - Wales
  - Isle of Man
  - Northern Ireland

=== Southern Europe ===
- Albania
- Andorra
- Bosnia and Herzegovina
- Bulgaria
- Corsica (FR)
- Croatia
- Gibraltar (UK)
- Greece
- Kosovo
- Italy
- Malta
- Moldova
- Monaco
- Montenegro
- North Macedonia
- Portugal
  - Azores
- Romania
- San Marino
- Serbia
- Slovenia
- Spain
- Vatican City

=== Western Europe ===
- Austria
- Belgium
- France
- Germany
- Liechtenstein
- Luxembourg
- Monaco
- Netherlands
- Switzerland

== Oceania ==
=== Australia and New Zealand ===
- Australia
  - Western Australia
  - Northern Territory
  - South Australia
  - Queensland
  - New South Wales
  - Victoria
  - Tasmania
  - Coral Sea Islands
  - Lord Howe Island
  - Norfolk Island
  - Ashmore Reef
  - Christmas Island
- New Zealand
  - Kermadec Islands
  - Chatham Islands
  - Bounty Islands
  - Antipodes Islands
  - Auckland Islands
  - Campbell Islands

=== Melanesia ===
- Fiji
- Papua New Guinea
- New Caledonia (FR)
- Torres Strait Islands (AU/Papua New Guinea)
- Solomon Islands
- Vanuatu

=== Micronesia ===
- Guam (US)
- Kiribati
- Marshall Islands
- Federated States of Micronesia
- Nauru
- Northern Mariana Islands (US)
- Palau
- United States Minor Outlying Islands-Pacific
  - Palmyra Atoll (US)
  - Wake Island (US)

=== Polynesia ===
- American Samoa (US)
- Cook Islands
- Easter Island (CL)
- French Polynesia (FR)
  - Tuamotus
- Hawaii (US)
- Niue
- Pitcairn (UK)
- Samoa
- Tokelau (NZ)
- Tonga
- Tuvalu
- Wallis and Futuna (FR)

== Antarctica & Southern Ocean islands ==
- Antarctica
- Bouvet Island (NO)
- British Antarctic Territory (UK)
  - South Georgia and the South Sandwich Islands
- French Southern and Antarctic Lands (FR)
- Heard and McDonald Islands (AU)
- Macquarie Island (AU)
- Prince Edward Islands (S. Africa)

== See also ==
- List of birds
- List of birds by common name
- Sibley–Monroe checklist
