= List of birds of the Bounty Islands =

This is a list of the bird species recorded on the Bounty Islands . The avifauna of the Bounty Islands include a total of 55 species.

This list's taxonomic treatment (designation and sequence of orders, families and species) and nomenclature (common and scientific names) follow the conventions of The Clements Checklist of Birds of the World, 2022 edition. The family accounts at the beginning of each heading reflect this taxonomy, as do the species counts found in each family account. Introduced and accidental species are included in the total counts for the Bounty Islands.

The following tags have been used to highlight several categories. The commonly occurring native species do not fall into any of these categories.

- (A) Accidental — a species that rarely or accidentally occurs on the Bounty Islands.
- (E) Endemic — a species endemic to the Bounty Islands.
- (I) Introduced — a species introduced to the Bounty Islands as a consequence, direct or indirect, of human actions.

== Stilts and avocets ==
Order: Charadriiformes Family: Recurvirostridae

Recurvirostridae is a family of large wading birds, which includes the avocets and stilts. The avocets have long legs and long up-curved bills. The stilts have extremely long legs and long, thin straight bills.

- Pied stilt, Himantopus leucocephalus (A)

== Plovers and lapwings ==
Order: Charadriiformes Family: Charadriidae

The family Charadriidae includes the plovers, dotterels and lapwings. They are small to medium-sized birds with compact bodies, short, thick necks and long, usually pointed, wings. They are found in open country worldwide, mostly in habitats near water.

- Masked lapwing, Vanellus miles (A)

== Skuas and jaegers ==
Order: Charadriiformes Family: Stercorariidae

The family Stercorariidae are, in general, medium to large birds, typically with grey or brown plumage, often with white markings on the wings. They nest on the ground in temperate and arctic regions and are long-distance migrants.

- Brown skua, Stercorarius antarcticus

== Gulls, terns, and skimmers ==
Order: Charadriiformes Family: Laridae

Laridae is a family of medium to large seabirds, the gulls, terns, and skimmers. Gulls are typically grey or white, often with black markings on the head or wings. They have stout, longish bills and webbed feet. Terns are a group of generally medium to large seabirds typically with grey or white plumage, often with black markings on the head. Most terns hunt fish by diving but some pick insects off the surface of fresh water. Terns are generally long-lived birds, with several species known to live in excess of 30 years.

- Silver gull, Chroicocephalus novaehollandiae
- Kelp gull, Larus dominicanus
- White-fronted tern, Sterna striata
- Arctic tern, Sterna paradisaea (A)
- Antarctic tern, Sterna vittata

== Penguins ==
Order: Sphenisciformes Family: Spheniscidae

Penguins are a group of aquatic, flightless birds living almost exclusively in the Southern Hemisphere, especially in Antarctica.

- Erect-crested penguin, Eudyptes sclateri
- Southern rockhopper penguin, Eudyptes chrysocome
- Snares penguin, Eudyptes robustus

== Albatrosses ==
Order: Procellariiformes Family: Diomedeidae

The albatrosses are among the largest of flying birds, and the great albatrosses from the genus Diomedea have the largest wingspans of any extant birds.

- Gray-headed albatross, Thalassarche chrysostoma
- Buller's albatross, Thalassarche bulleri
- White-capped albatross, Thalassarche cauta
- Salvin's albatross, Thalassarche salvini
- Black-browed albatross, Thalassarche melanophris
- Sooty albatross, Phoebetria fusca
- Light-mantled albatross, Phoebetria palpebrata
- Royal albatross, Diomedea epomophora
- Wandering albatross, Diomedea exulans

== Southern storm-petrels ==
Order: Procellariiformes Family: Oceanitidae

The southern storm-petrels are relatives of the petrels and are the smallest seabirds. They feed on planktonic crustaceans and small fish picked from the surface, typically while hovering. The flight is fluttering and sometimes bat-like.

- Wilson's storm-petrel, Oceanites oceanicus
- Gray-backed storm-petrel, Garrodia nereis
- White-faced storm-petrel, Pelagodroma marina
- Black-bellied storm-petrel, Fregetta tropica

== Shearwaters and petrels ==
Order: Procellariiformes Family: Procellariidae

The procellariids are the main group of medium-sized "true petrels", characterised by united nostrils with medium septum and a long outer functional primary.

- Southern giant-petrel, Macronectes giganteus
- Northern giant-petrel, Macronectes halli
- Southern fulmar, Fulmarus glacialoides
- Cape petrel, Daption capense
- Kerguelen petrel, Aphrodroma brevirostris
- Gray-faced petrel, Pterodroma gouldi
- Magenta petrel, Pterodroma magentae
- Soft-plumaged petrel, Pterodroma mollis
- White-headed petrel, Pterodroma lessonii
- Mottled petrel, Pterodroma inexpectata
- Chatham petrel, Pterodroma axillaris
- Pycroft's petrel, Pterodroma pycrofti (A)
- Blue petrel, Halobaena caerulea
- Fairy prion, Pachyptila turtur
- Broad-billed prion, Pachyptila vittata
- Antarctic prion, Pachyptila desolata
- Fulmar prion, Pachyptila crassirostris
- Gray petrel, Procellaria cinerea
- White-chinned petrel, Procellaria aequinoctialis
- Buller's shearwater, Ardenna bulleri
- Sooty shearwater, Ardenna grisea
- Short-tailed shearwater, Ardenna tenuirostris
- Subantarctic shearwater, Puffinus elegans (A)
- Common diving-petrel, Pelecanoides urinatrix

== Cormorants and shags ==
Order: Suliformes Family: Phalacrocoracidae

Cormorants are medium-to-large aquatic birds, usually with mainly dark plumage and areas of coloured skin on the face. The bill is long, thin and sharply hooked. Their feet are four-toed and webbed, a distinguishing feature among the order Pelecaniformes.

- Bounty Islands shag, Leucocarbo ranfurlyi (E)

== White-eyes, yuhinas, and allies ==
Order: Passeriformes Family: Zosteropidae

The white-eyes are small birds of rather drab appearance, the plumage above being typically greenish-olive, but some species have a white or bright yellow throat, breast, or lower parts, and several have buff flanks. As the name suggests, many species have a white ring around each eye.

- Silvereye, Zosterops lateralis

== Starlings ==
Order: Passeriformes Family: Sturnidae

Starlings are small to medium-sized passerine birds. Their flight is strong and direct and they are very gregarious. Their preferred habitat is fairly open country. They eat insects and fruit. Plumage is typically dark with a metallic sheen.

- European starling, Sturnus vulgaris (A)

== Wagtails and pipits ==
Order: Passeriformes Family: Motacillidae

Motacillidae is a family of small passerine birds with medium to long tails and comprises the wagtails, longclaws, and pipits. These are slender ground-feeding insectivores of open country.

- New Zealand pipit, Anthus novaeseelandiae

== Finches, euphonias, and allies ==
Order: Passeriformes Family: Fringillidae

Finches are small to moderately large seed-eating passerine birds with a strong beak, usually conical and in some species very large. All have 12 tail feathers and nine primary flight feathers. Finches have a bouncing flight, alternating bouts of flapping with gliding on closed wings, and most sing well.

- Common chaffinch, Fringilla coelebs (A)
- Lesser redpoll, Acanthis cabaret (I)
- European goldfinch, Carduelis carduelis (I)

== See also ==
- List of birds
- Lists of birds by region
