= List of birds of Bouvet Island =

Map of Southern Hemisphere showing location of Bouvet Island off Antarctica

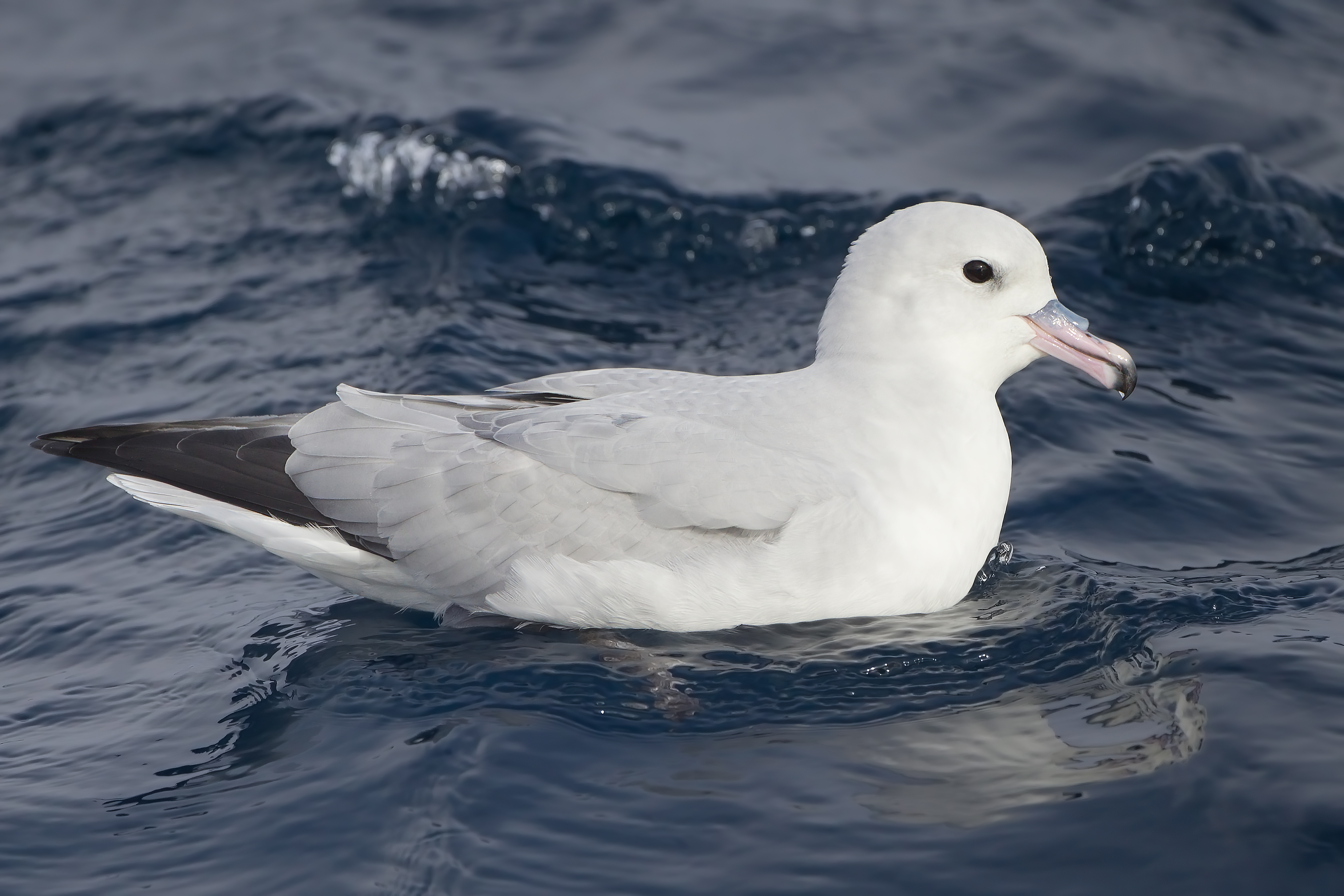
An estimated 100,000 southern fulmars breed on Bouvet Island.

Bouvet Island is an uninhabited, sub-Antarctic island administered as a dependency of Norway. A small, isolated volcanic island at the southern tip of the Mid-Atlantic Ridge, it is located around 2,600 km (1,600 mi) southwest of South Africa and 1,600 km (990 mi) from Antarctica. The island has undergone very little human modification and, along with its surrounding waters, has been declared a protected area. Located in frigid climates south of the Antarctic Polar Frontal Zone, Bouvet Island experiences average annual temperatures between −2.7 and 1.6 °C (27.1 and 34.9 °F) and 93% of the island's land area is covered by permanent sheets of ice. The coastal ice-free regions consist of heaps of boulders, lava blocks, and gravel, and are rapidly eroding; the largest such area, Nyrøysa, retreated 50–100 m (160–330 ft) inland from 1966 to 1979 and 6–9 m (20–30 ft) from 1996 to 1999. The island's vegetation consists of ascomycete fungi, lichens, mosses, liverworts, and algae. Vegetation is largely limited to the coasts and a few exposed mountain peaks and plateaus. Animal diversity is similarly poor: there are seven species of arthropods, one species of oligochaete worm, and two mammals (southern elephant seal and Antarctic fur seal) known to occur on the island.

There are 41 species of birds that have been recorded on Bouvet Island. Twelve of these species have confirmed breeding populations on the island, while another two, the slender-billed prion and kelp gull, are thought to breed there. The species with large breeding populations include the southern fulmar, with an estimated population of 100,000 breeding adults, and the black-bellied storm petrel, with an estimated population of 1,000 breeding adults. A large number of penguins also breed on the island: in 1978–1979, there were an estimated 117,000, mostly macaroni and chinstrap penguins. However, the penguin population declined at an annual rate of 4.8% from 1979 to 1990, falling to just 62,125 adults, and is thought to have decreased even faster subsequently. This decline is caused by changes in oceanic conditions, competition for food, and an expanding fur seal population on the island. Breeding birds on the island are threatened by the erosion of coastal breeding areas and commercial longline fishing. Nineteen species are summer migrants to the island. The entire protected area of Bouvet Island has been designated an Important Bird Area by BirdLife International due to its high conservation value.

This list's taxonomic treatment (designation and sequence of orders, families, and species) and nomenclature (common and scientific names) follow the conventions of the 2022 edition of The Clements Checklist of Birds of the World. The family accounts at the beginning of each heading reflect this taxonomy, as do the species counts found in each family account. The tag (A) is used for accidentals, species that only occur on Bouvet Island rarely or accidentally.

== Skuas and jaegers ==
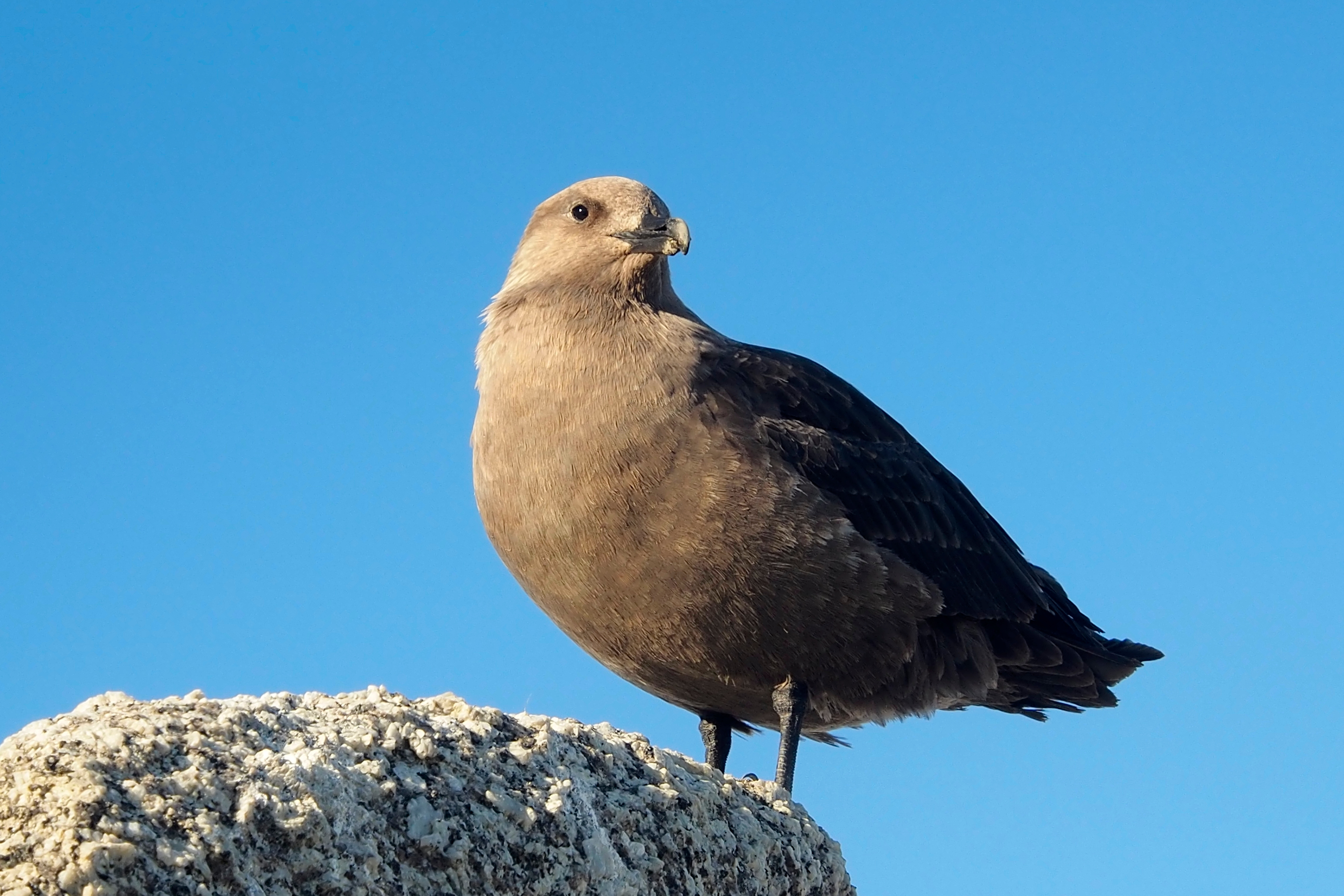
South polar skua

Order: Charadriiformes Family: Stercorariidae

Skuas and jaegers are medium to large seabirds with strongly hooked talons, hooked beaks, and webbed feet. They are pelagic birds and feed on a variety of animals—such as fish, bird eggs, and lemmings—by hunting, scavenging, or kleptoparasitizing them.

- Parasitic jaeger, Stercorarius parasiticus
- Brown skua, Stercorarius antarcticus
- South polar skua, Stercorarius maccormicki

== Gulls, terns, and skimmers ==
Order: Charadriiformes Family: Laridae

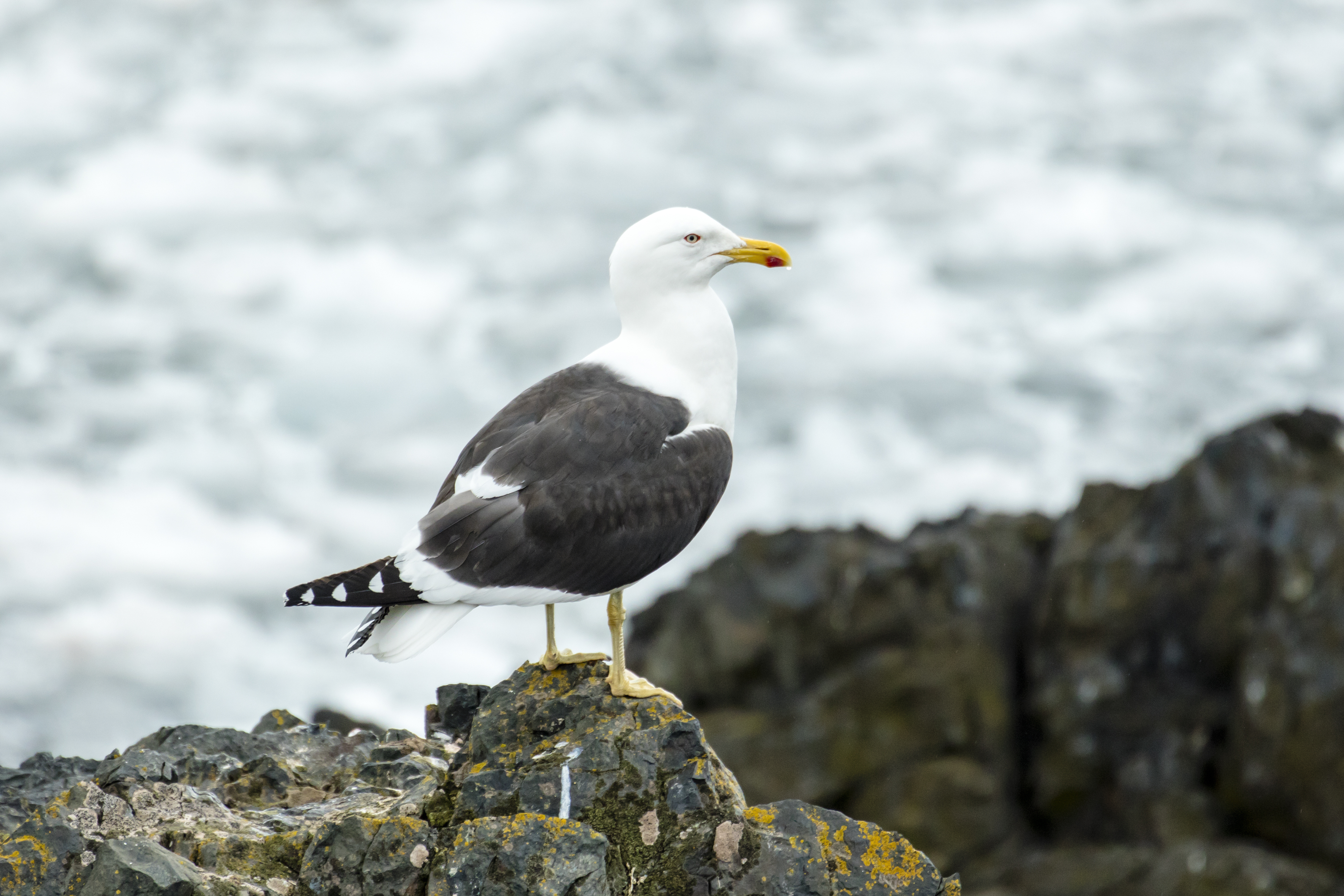
Kelp gull

Laridae is a family of seabirds consisting of gulls, terns, and skimmers. Gulls are typically grey or white, often with black markings on the head or wings. Terns are generally smaller than gulls with more pointed wings and bills, many also having forked tails which help with aerial manoeuvrability. Both species can be found inland near lakes and rivers, however gulls have adapted well to human presence and can often be found in urban centers.

- Kelp gull, Larus dominicanus
- Arctic tern, Sterna paradisaea
- Antarctic tern, Sterna vittata

== Penguins ==
Order: Sphenisciformes Family: Spheniscidae

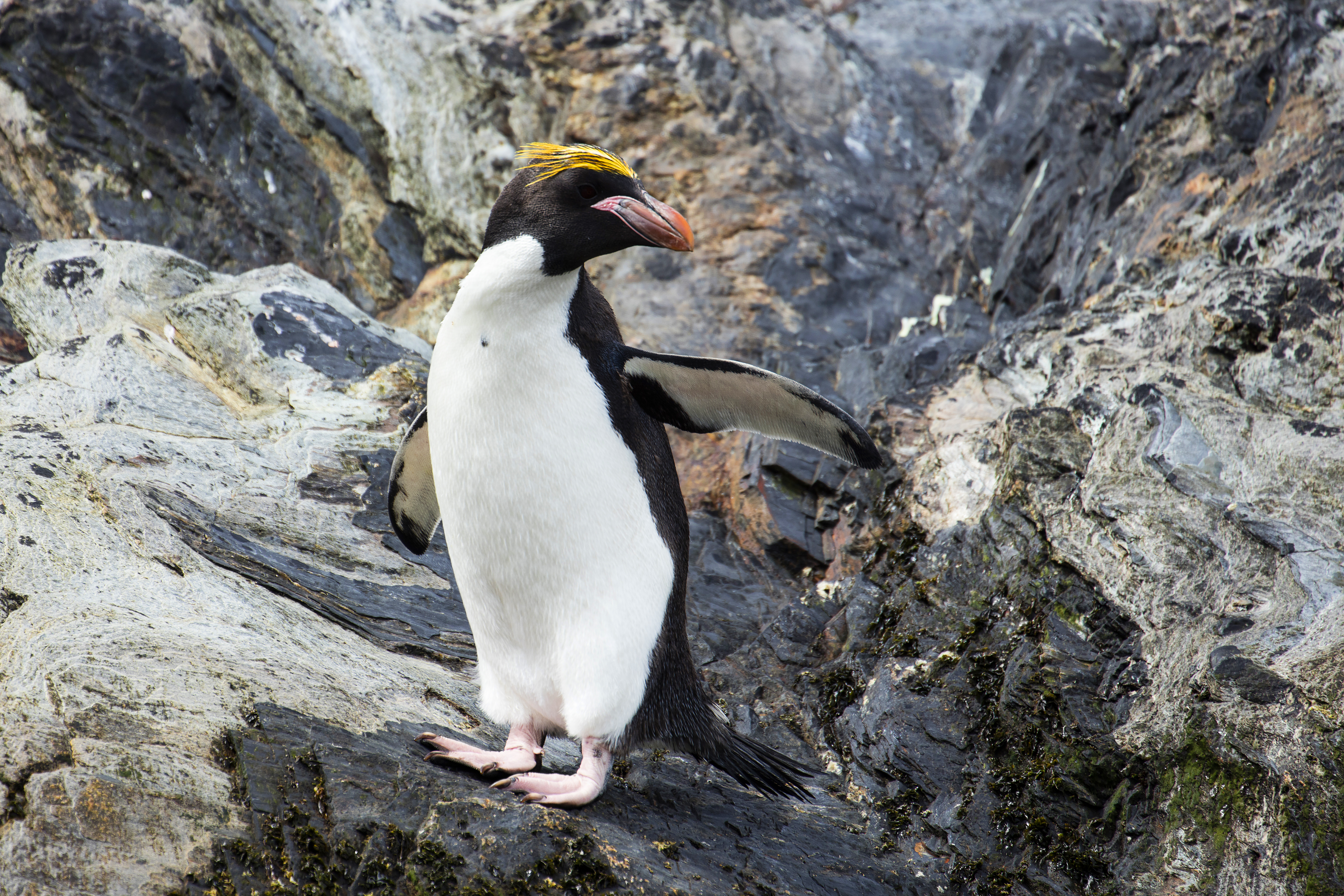
Macaroni penguin

Penguins are aquatic, flightless birds that live almost exclusively in the Southern Hemisphere. Most penguins feed on krill, fish, squid, and other forms of sealife caught while swimming underwater.

- King penguin, Aptenodytes patagonicus
- Adelie penguin, Pygoscelis adeliae
- Gentoo penguin, Pygoscelis papua
- Chinstrap penguin, Pygoscelis antarcticus
- Macaroni penguin, Eudyptes chrysolophus

== Albatrosses ==
Order: Procellariiformes Family: Diomedeidae

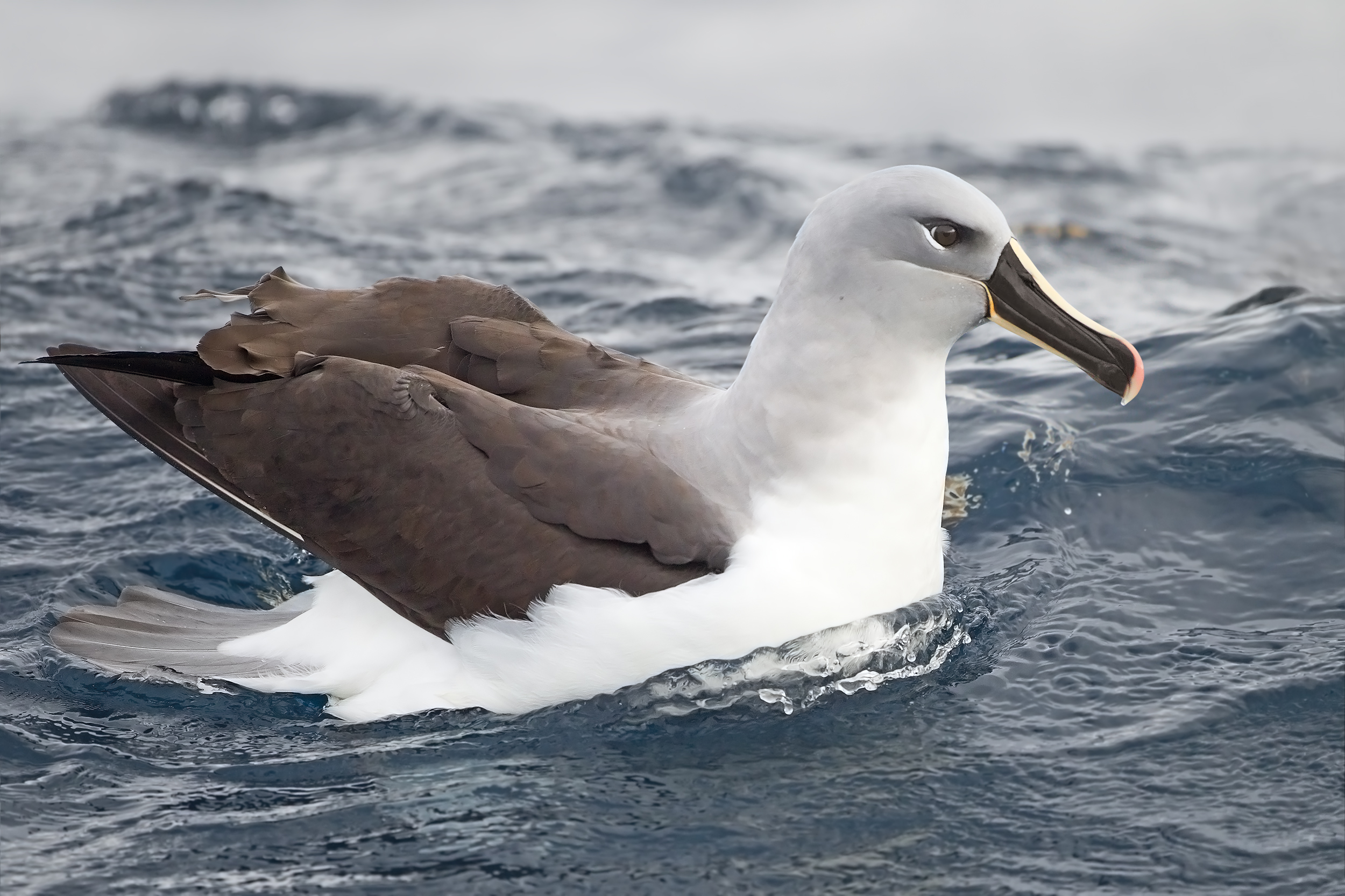
Gray-headed albatross

Albatrosses are large birds with long and narrow wings adapted to long-distance flight; the great albatrosses from the genus Diomedea have the largest wingspans of any bird. They also differ from the rest of the Procellariformes in having separate nostrils.

- Northern royal albatross, Diomedea sanfordi
- Southern royal albatross, Diomedea epomophora
- Snowy albatross, Diomedea exulans
- Sooty albatross, Phoebetria fusca
- Light-mantled albatross, Phoebetria palpebrata
- Atlantic yellow-nosed albatross, Thalassarche chlororhynchos
- Gray-headed albatross, Thalassarche chrysostoma
- Black-browed albatross, Thalassarche melanophris

== Southern storm petrels ==
Order: Procellariiformes Family: Oceanitidae

Southern storm petrels are relatives of the petrels and are extremely small seabirds. They feed on planktonic crustaceans and small fish picked from the surface, typically while hovering. Unlike their larger relatives, their flight is highly fluttering and very rarely includes any soaring.

- Wilson's storm petrel, Oceanites oceanicus
- Black-bellied storm petrel, Fregetta tropica

== Shearwaters and petrels ==
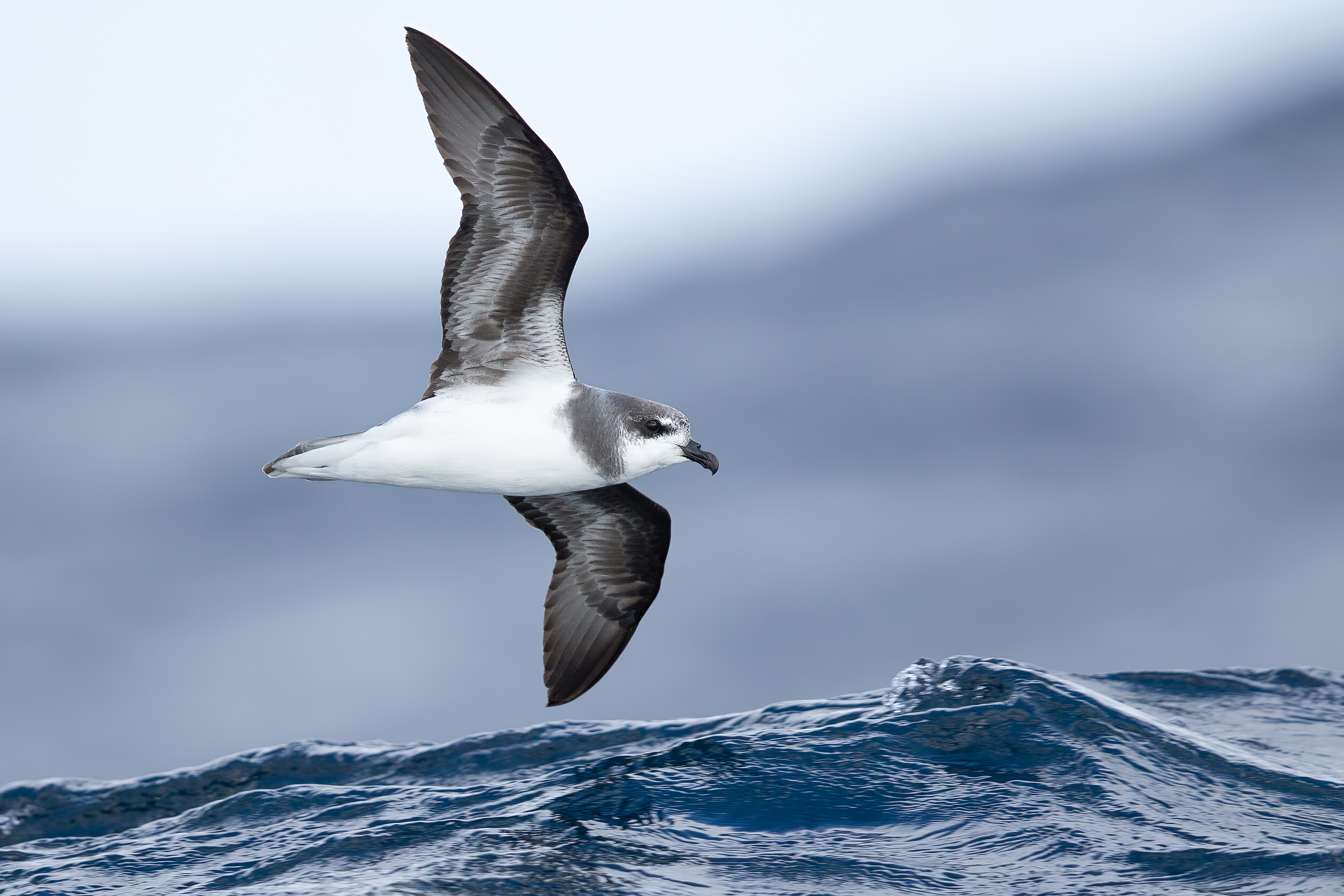
Light morph of soft-plumaged petrel

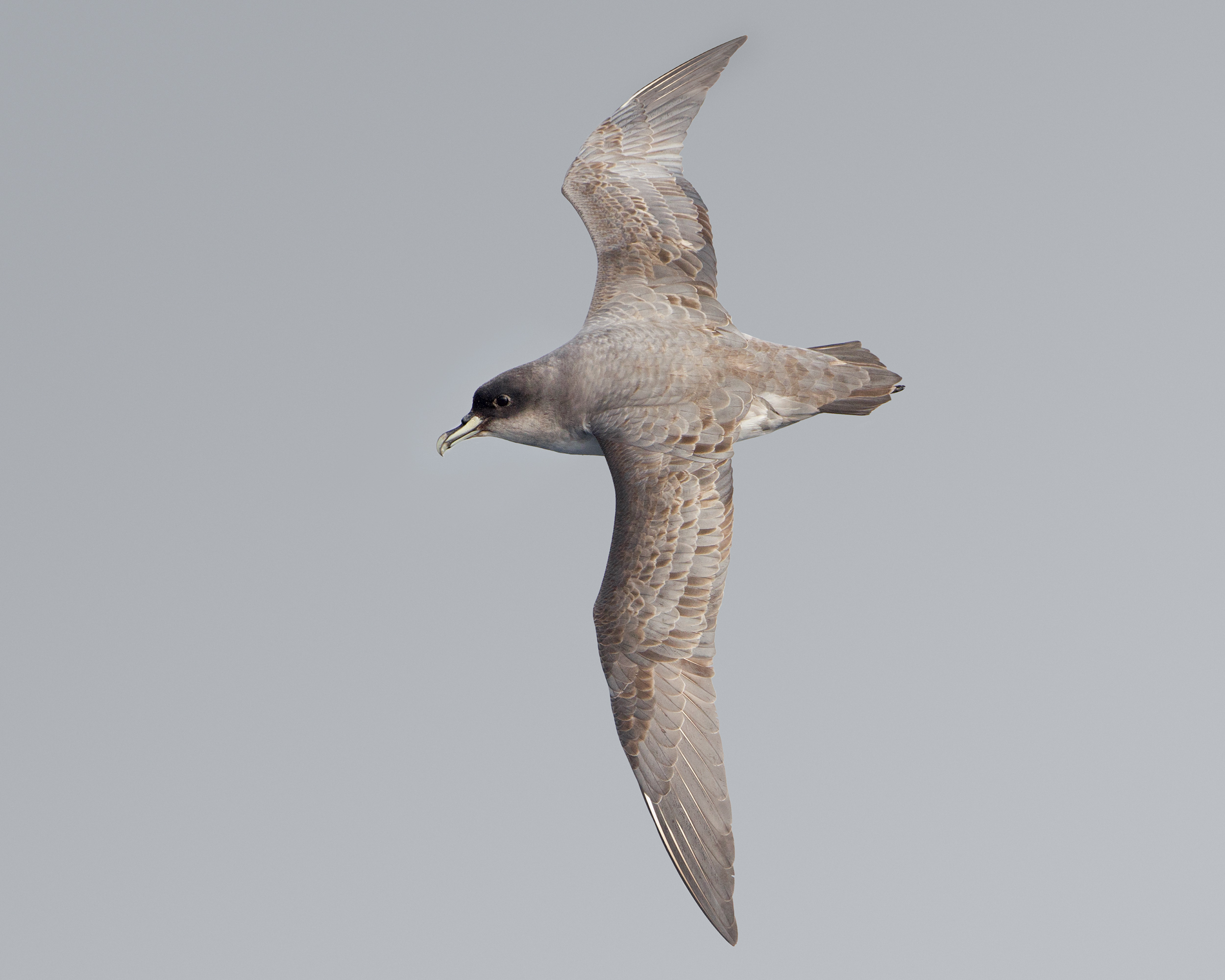
Gray petrel

Order: Procellariiformes Family: Procellariidae

Procellariids are a group of medium-sized petrels, characterised by united nostrils with a medium nasal septum and a long outer functional primary flight feather.

- Southern giant petrel, Macronectes giganteus
- Northern giant petrel, Macronectes halli
- Southern fulmar, Fulmarus glacialoides
- Antarctic petrel, Thalassoica antarctica
- Cape petrel, Daption capense
- Snow petrel, Pagodroma nivea
- Kerguelen petrel, Aphrodroma brevirostris
- Great-winged petrel, Pterodroma macroptera (A)
- Soft-plumaged petrel, Pterodroma mollis
- White-headed petrel, Pterodroma lessonii
- Blue petrel, Halobaena caerulea
- Fairy prion, Pachyptila turtur
- Broad-billed prion, Pachyptila vittata
- Antarctic prion, Pachyptila desolata
- Slender-billed prion, Pachyptila belcheri
- Gray petrel, Procellaria cinerea
- White-chinned petrel, Procellaria aequinoctialis
- Great shearwater, Ardenna gravis
- Sooty shearwater, Ardenna grisea
- Common diving petrel, Pelecanoides urinatrix

== See also ==
- List of birds
- Lists of birds by region
