= List of birds of Tuvalu =

Location of Tuvalu

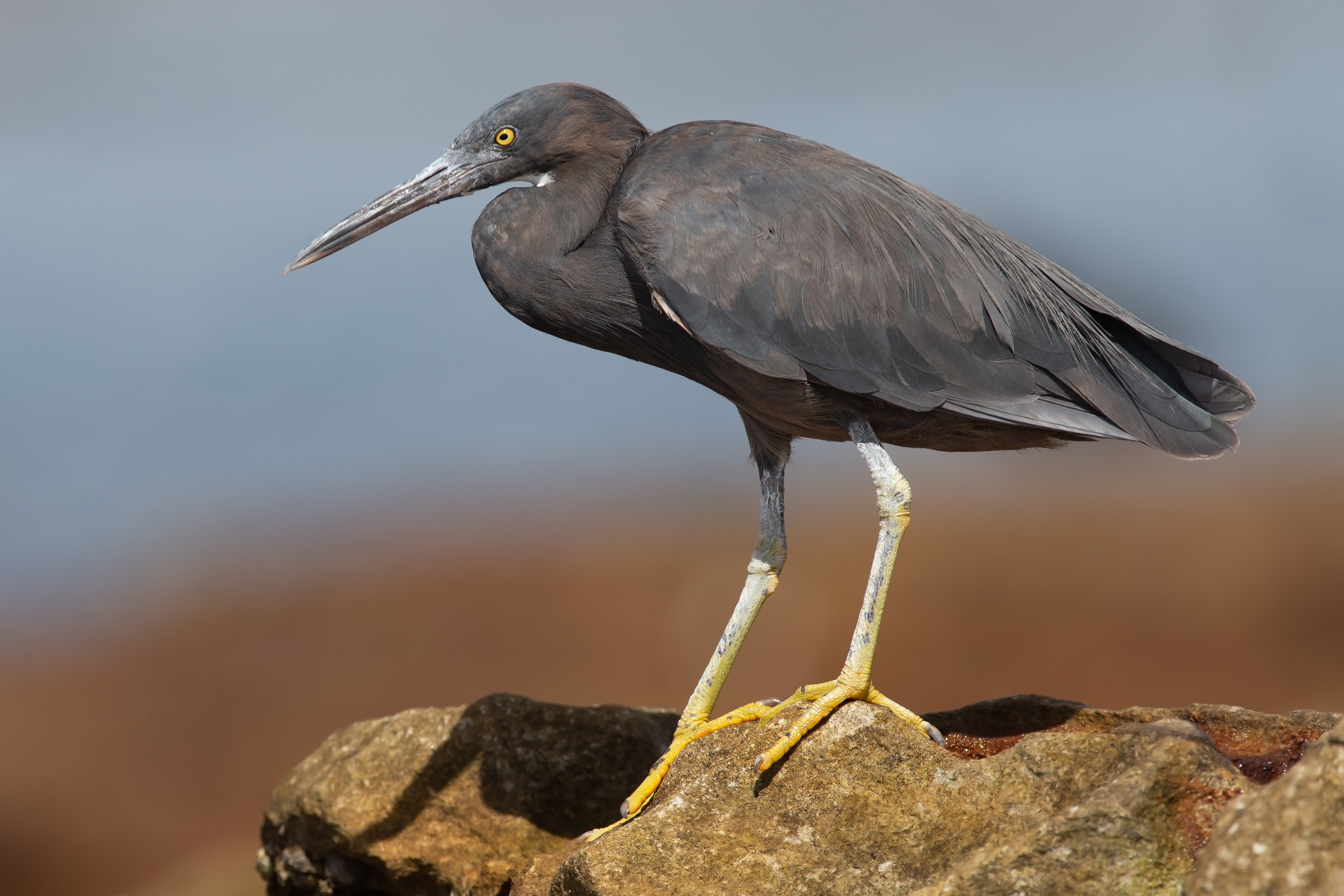
The Pacific reef-heron (dark morph pictured) is one of three native land birds that breeds on Tuvalu.

Tuvalu, previously known as the Ellice Islands, is an island country in Polynesia in the Pacific Ocean. It consists of six atolls and three reef islands (islands made of rocks from coral skeletons), with a total land area of 26 km^{2} (10 sq mi). Its climate is hot and humid, with annual rainfall varying from 2,500–3,500 mm (98–138 in). The soil is very weakly developed, consisting mostly of coral sand and calcium carbonate-rich regosols. Vegetation on the islands predominantly consists of coconuts, screw palms, Casuarina, creepers, and grass, although some native forest exists. Previously, the islands were likely covered with Pisonia woodland.

Thirty-seven species of birds have been recorded on Tuvalu, one of which has been introduced by humans. Thirteen of these species, nine of which are seabirds, breed in the country. The Pacific reef-heron, Pacific imperial-pigeon, and buff-banded rail, along with the introduced red junglefowl, are the remaining breeding species. Nine species of shorebird, eight species of seabird, mallards, and long-railed koels are migratory visitors to the islands. Four species of birds found in Tuvalu are globally threatened; the bristle-thighed curlew, bar-tailed godwit, and gray-tailed tattler are near-threatened, while the Phoenix petrel is vulnerable. Before the arrival of humans, the birds of the islands may have also included kingfishers, Acrocephalus warblers, Aplonis starlings, Prosobonia sandpipers, and fruit doves. However, higher sea levels at that time might have eliminated fresh water sources on most of the atolls, making them unsuitable for pigeons or starlings.

This list's taxonomic treatment (designation and sequence of orders, families, genera and species) and nomenclature (common and scientific names) follow the conventions of the 2022 edition of The Clements Checklist of Birds of the World. The family accounts at the beginning of each heading reflect this taxonomy, as do the species counts found in each family account.

The following codes have been used to show several categories. Species without any tags are commonly occurring native species.

- (A) Accidental: a species that rarely or accidentally occurs in Tuvalu.
- (I) Introduced: a species introduced to Tuvalu as a direct or indirect consequence of human action.

== Ducks, geese, and waterfowl ==
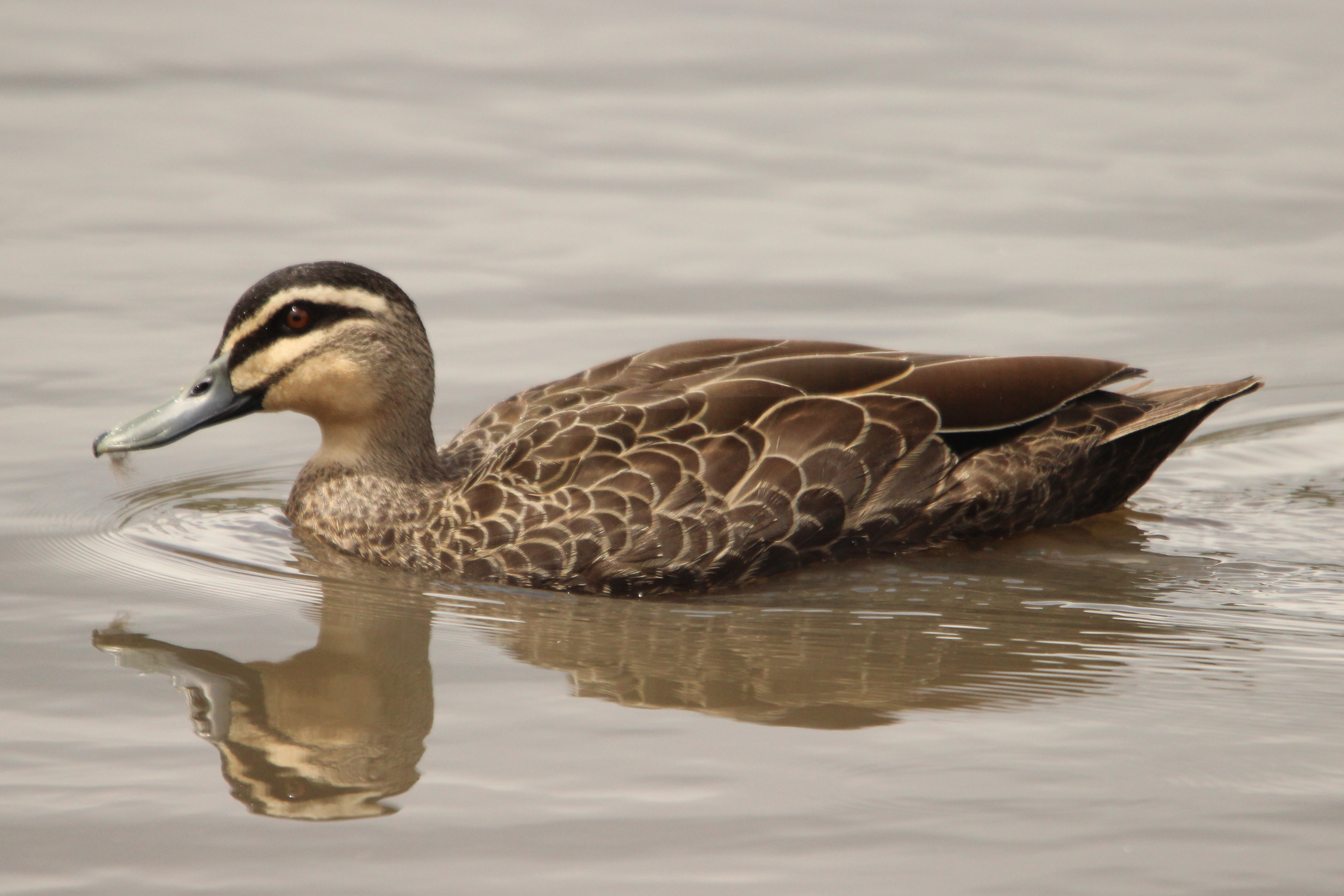
Pacific black duck

Order: Anseriformes Family: Anatidae

Anatidae includes the ducks and most duck-like waterfowl, such as geese and swans. These birds are adapted to an aquatic existence with webbed feet, flattened bills, and feathers that are excellent at shedding water due to an oily coating.

- Pacific black duck, Anas superciliosa
- Mallard, Anas platyrhynchos (A)

== Pheasants, grouse, and allies ==
Order: Galliformes Family: Phasianidae

The Phasianidae are a family of terrestrial birds which consists of quails, partridges, snowcocks, francolins, spurfowls, tragopans, monals, pheasants, peafowls and jungle fowls. In general, they are plump (although they vary in size) and have broad, relatively short wings.

- Red junglefowl, Gallus gallus (I)

== Pigeons and doves ==
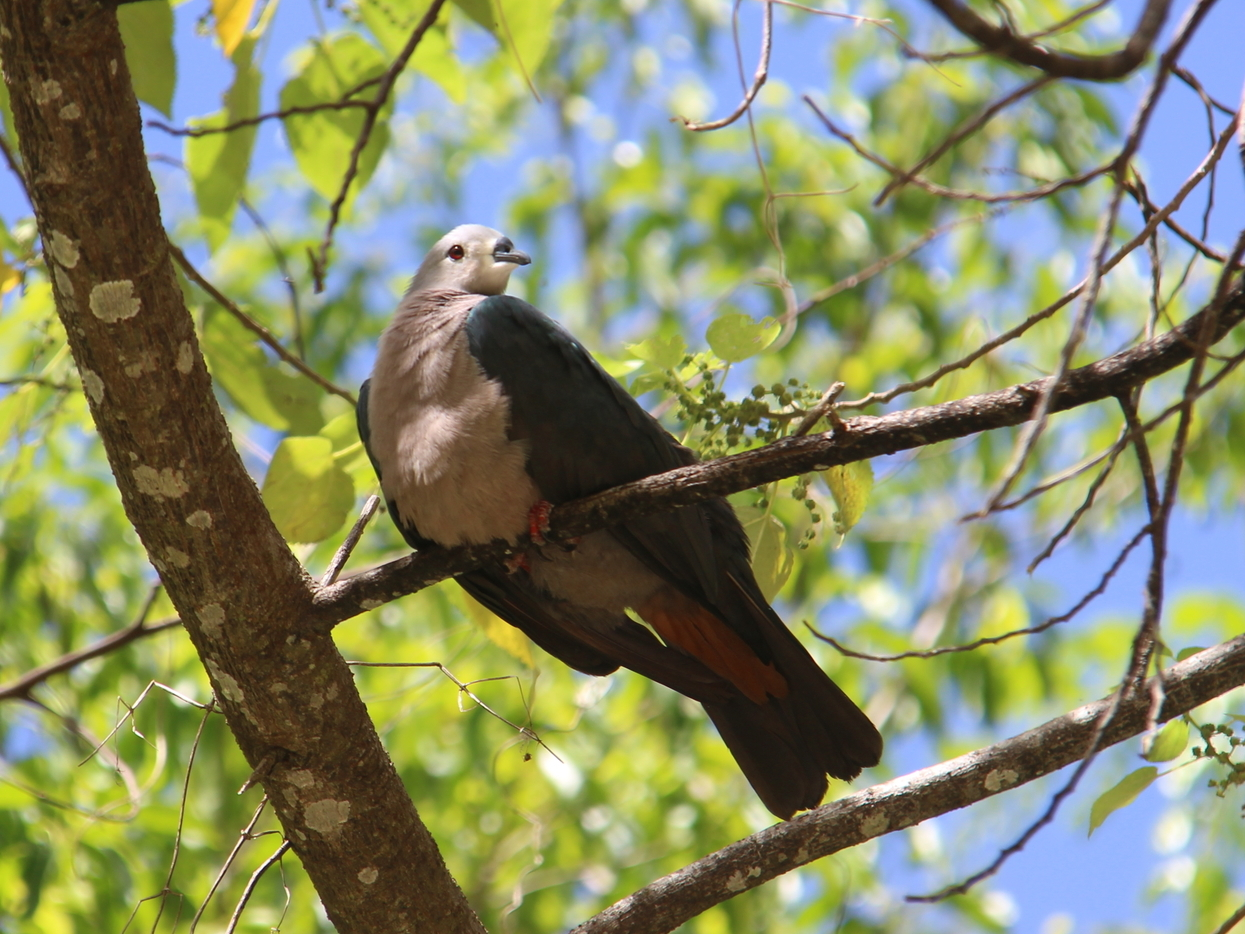
Pacific imperial-pigeon

Order: Columbiformes Family: Columbidae

Pigeons and doves are stout-bodied birds with short necks and short slender bills with a fleshy cere.

- Pacific imperial-pigeon, Ducula pacifica

== Cuckoos ==
Order: Cuculiformes Family: Cuculidae

The family Cuculidae includes cuckoos, roadrunners, and anis. These birds are of variable size with slender bodies, long tails, and strong legs.

- Long-tailed koel, Urodynamis taitensis

== Rails, gallinules, and coots ==
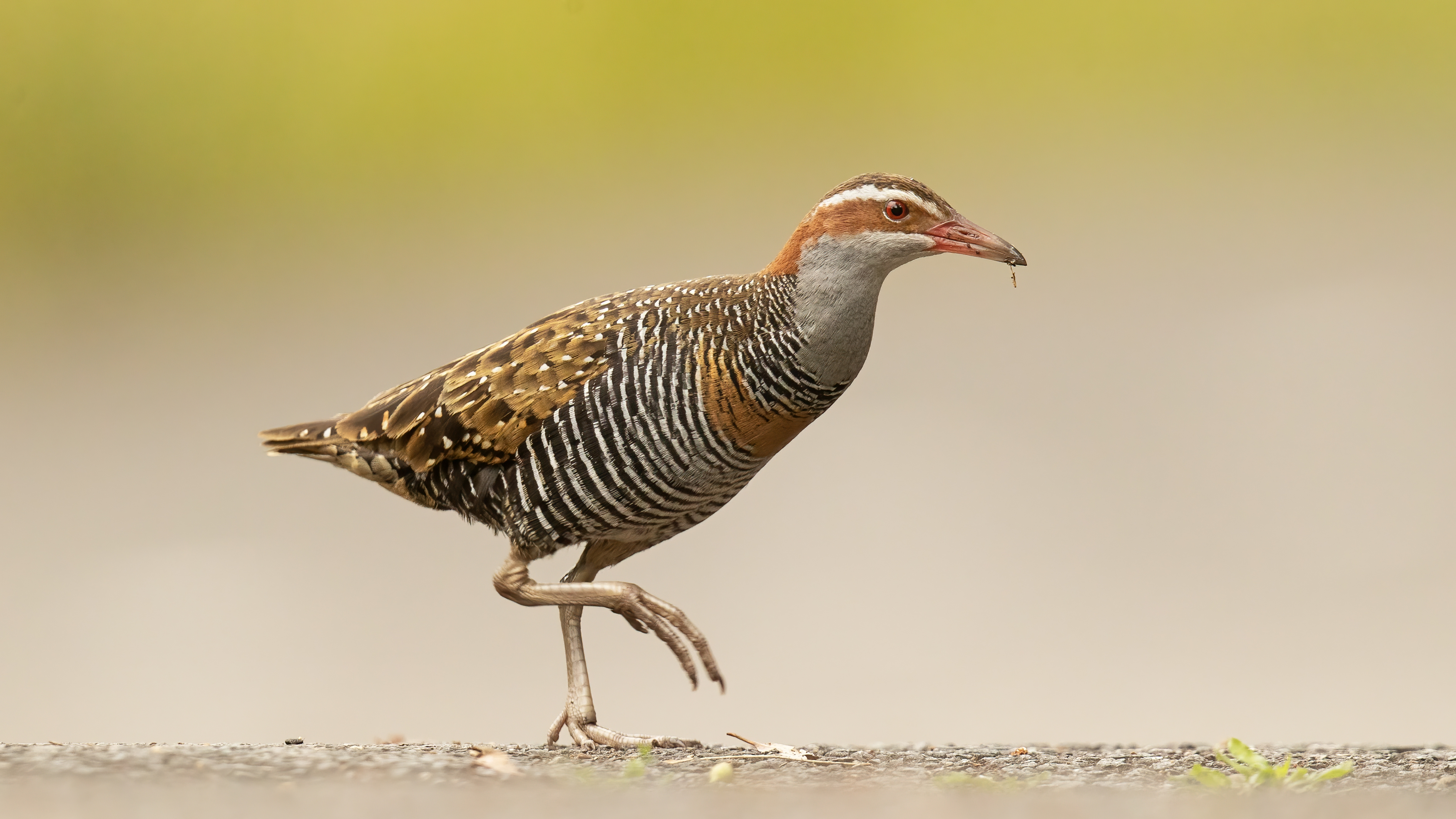
Buff-banded rail

Order: Gruiformes Family: Rallidae

Rallidae is a large family of small to medium-sized birds which includes the rails, crakes, coots, and gallinules. Typically they inhabit dense vegetation in damp environments near lakes, swamps, or rivers. In general, they are shy and secretive birds, making them difficult to observe. Most species have strong legs and long toes which are well adapted to soft uneven surfaces. They tend to have short, rounded wings and to be weak fliers. The buff-banded rail only established a breeding population in 1972.

- Buff-banded rail, Gallirallus philippensis

== Plovers and lapwings ==
Order: Charadriiformes Family: Charadriidae

The family Charadriidae includes the plovers, dotterels, and lapwings. They are small to medium-sized birds with compact bodies, short, thick necks, and long, usually pointed, wings.

- Pacific golden-plover, Pluvialis fulva
- Common ringed plover, Charadrius hiaticula (A)
- Semipalmated plover, Charadrius semipalmatus (A)

== Sandpipers and allies ==
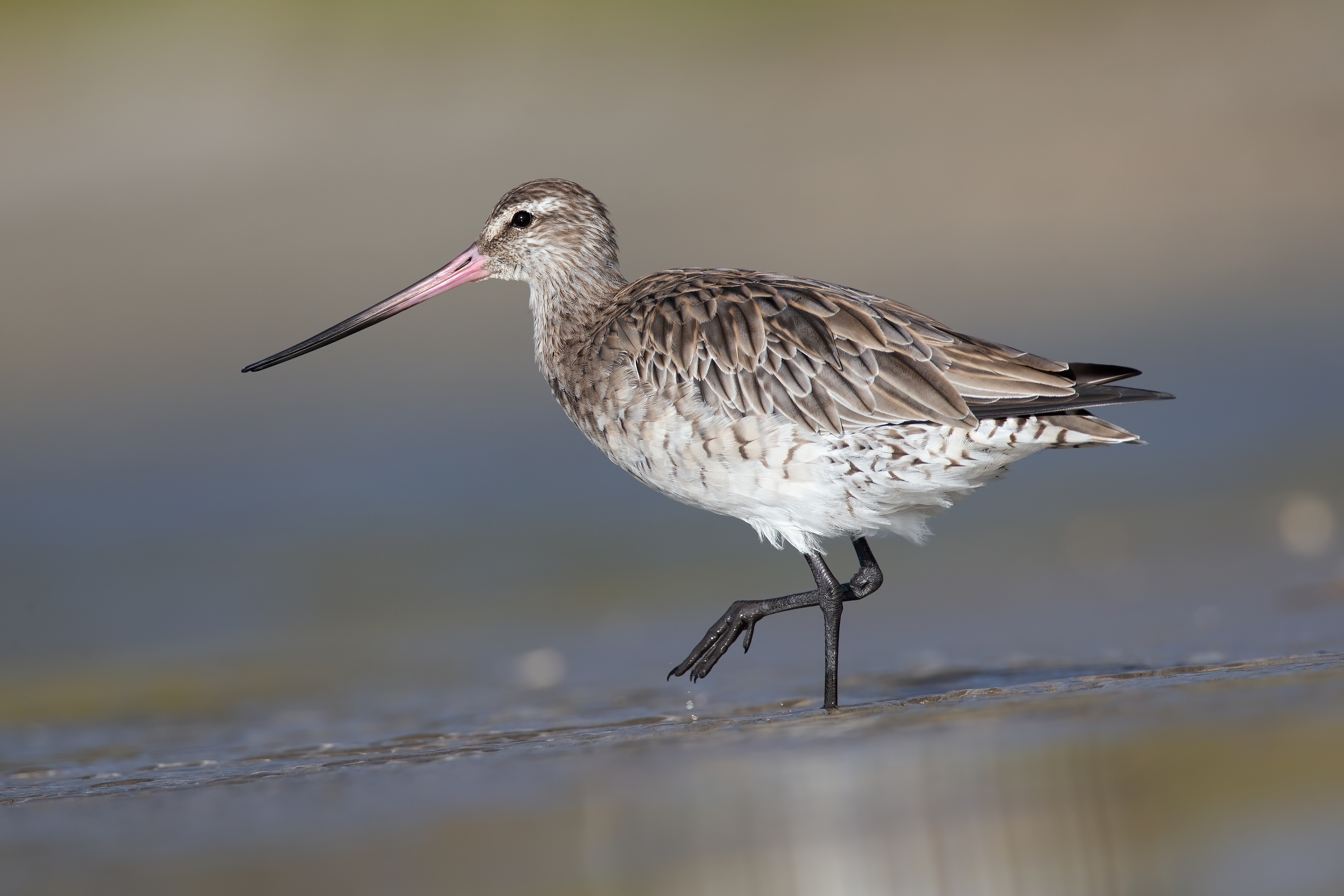
Bar-tailed godwit in non-breeding plumage

Order: Charadriiformes Family: Scolopacidae

Scolopacidae is a large diverse family of small to medium-sized shorebirds including the sandpipers, curlews, godwits, shanks, tattlers, woodcocks, snipes, dowitchers and phalaropes. The majority of these species eat small invertebrates picked out of the mud or soil. Some species have highly specialised bills adapted to specific feeding strategies.

- Bristle-thighed curlew, Numenius tahitiensis
- Whimbrel, Numenius phaeopus (A)
- Bar-tailed godwit, Limosa lapponica
- Ruddy turnstone, Arenaria interpres
- Sanderling, Calidris alba
- Gray-tailed tattler, Tringa brevipes
- Wandering tattler, Tringa incana

== Gulls, terns, and skimmers ==
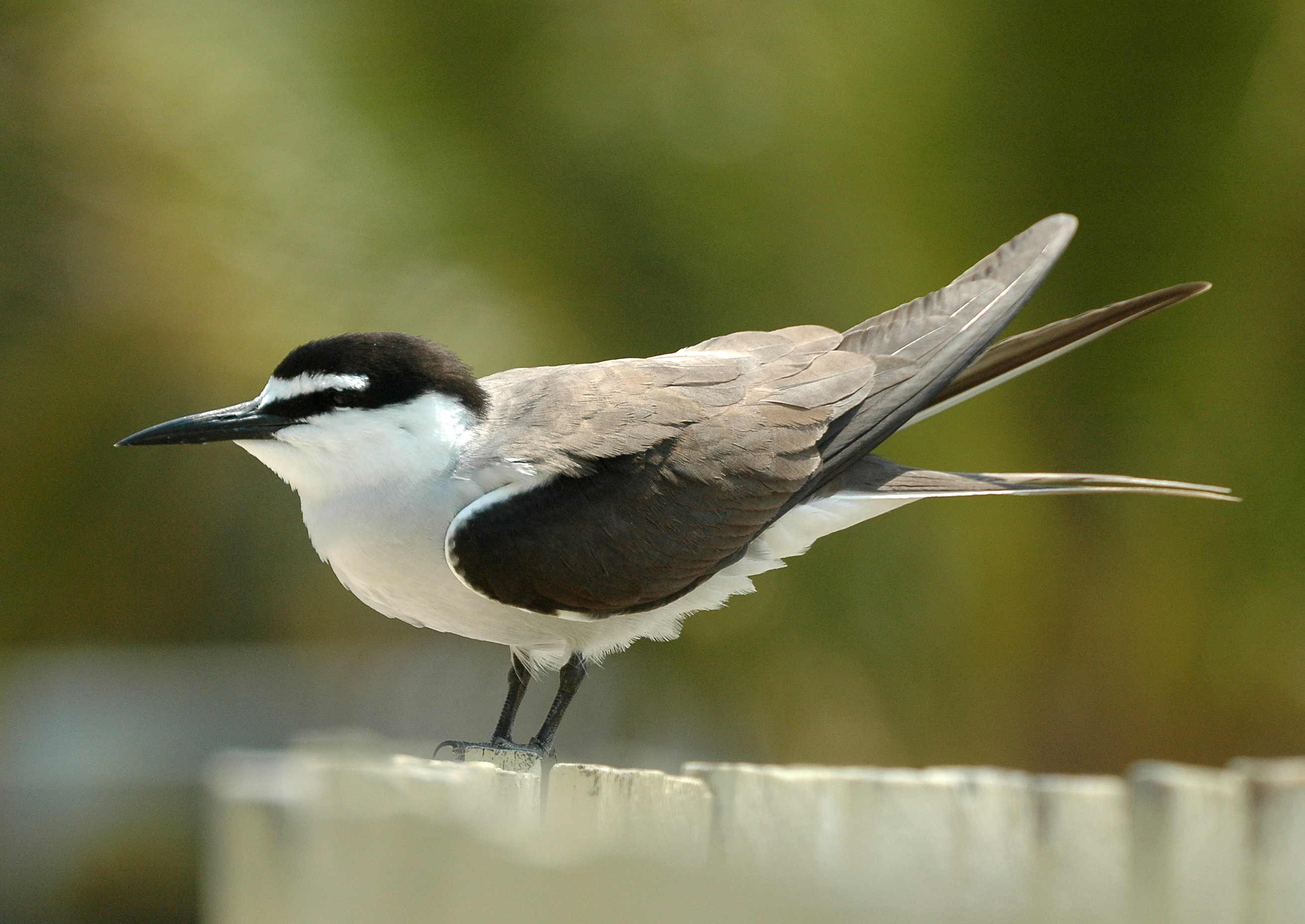
Bridled tern

Order: Charadriiformes Family: Laridae

Laridae is a family of seabirds consisting of gulls, terns, and skimmers. Gulls are typically grey or white, often with black markings on the head or wings. Terns are generally smaller than gulls with more pointed wings and bills, many also having forked tails which help with aerial manoeuvrability.

- Brown noddy, Anous stolidus
- Black noddy, Anous minutus
- Blue-gray noddy, Anous ceruleus (A)
- White tern, Gygis alba
- Sooty tern, Onychoprion fuscatus
- Grey-backed tern, Onychoprion lunatus (A)
- Bridled tern, Onychoprion anaethetus
- Black-naped tern, Sterna sumatrana
- Great crested tern, Thalasseus bergii

== Tropicbirds ==
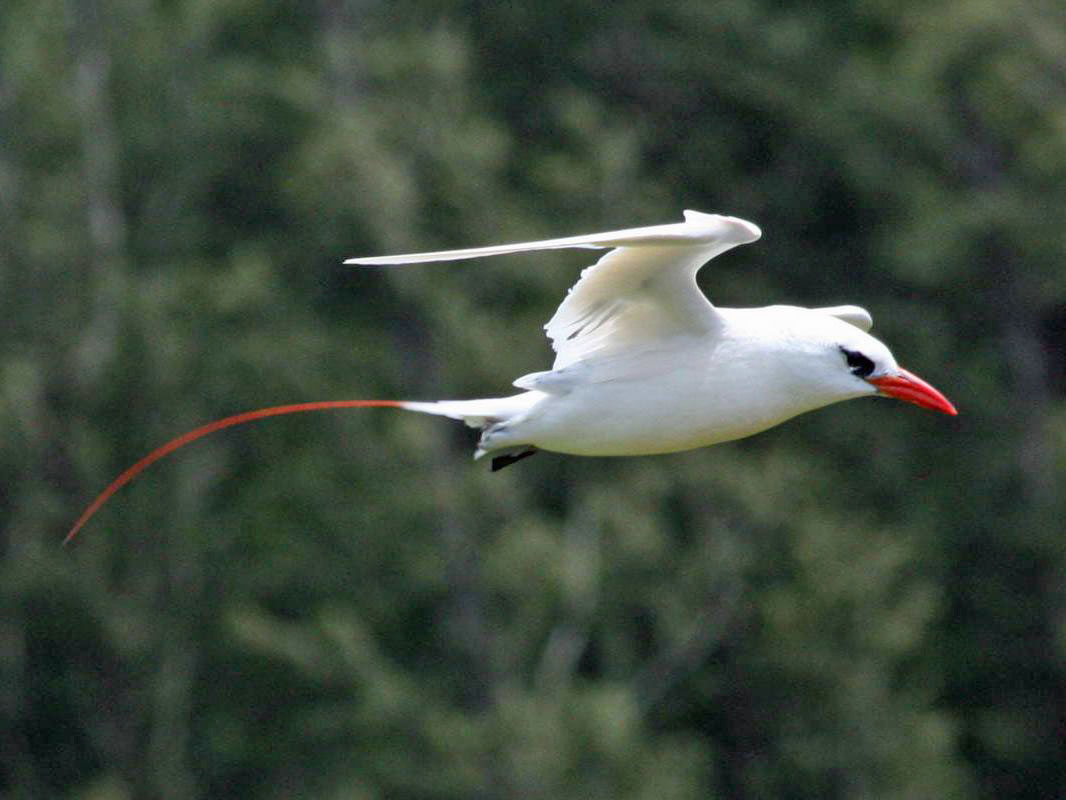
Red-tailed tropicbird

Order: Phaethontiformes Family: Phaethontidae

Tropicbirds are slender white birds of tropical oceans, with exceptionally long central tail feathers. Their heads and long wings have black markings.

- White-tailed tropicbird, Phaethon lepturus
- Red-tailed tropicbird, Phaethon rubricauda (A)

== Shearwaters and petrels ==
Order: Procellariiformes Family: Procellariidae

The procellariids are a group of medium-sized petrels, characterised by united nostrils with a medium nasal septum and a long outer functional primary flight feather.

- Phoenix petrel, Pterodroma alba (A)
- Wedge-tailed shearwater, Ardenna pacificus (A)
- Christmas shearwater, Puffinus nativitatis (A)
- Tropical shearwater, Puffinus bailloni (A)

== Frigatebirds ==
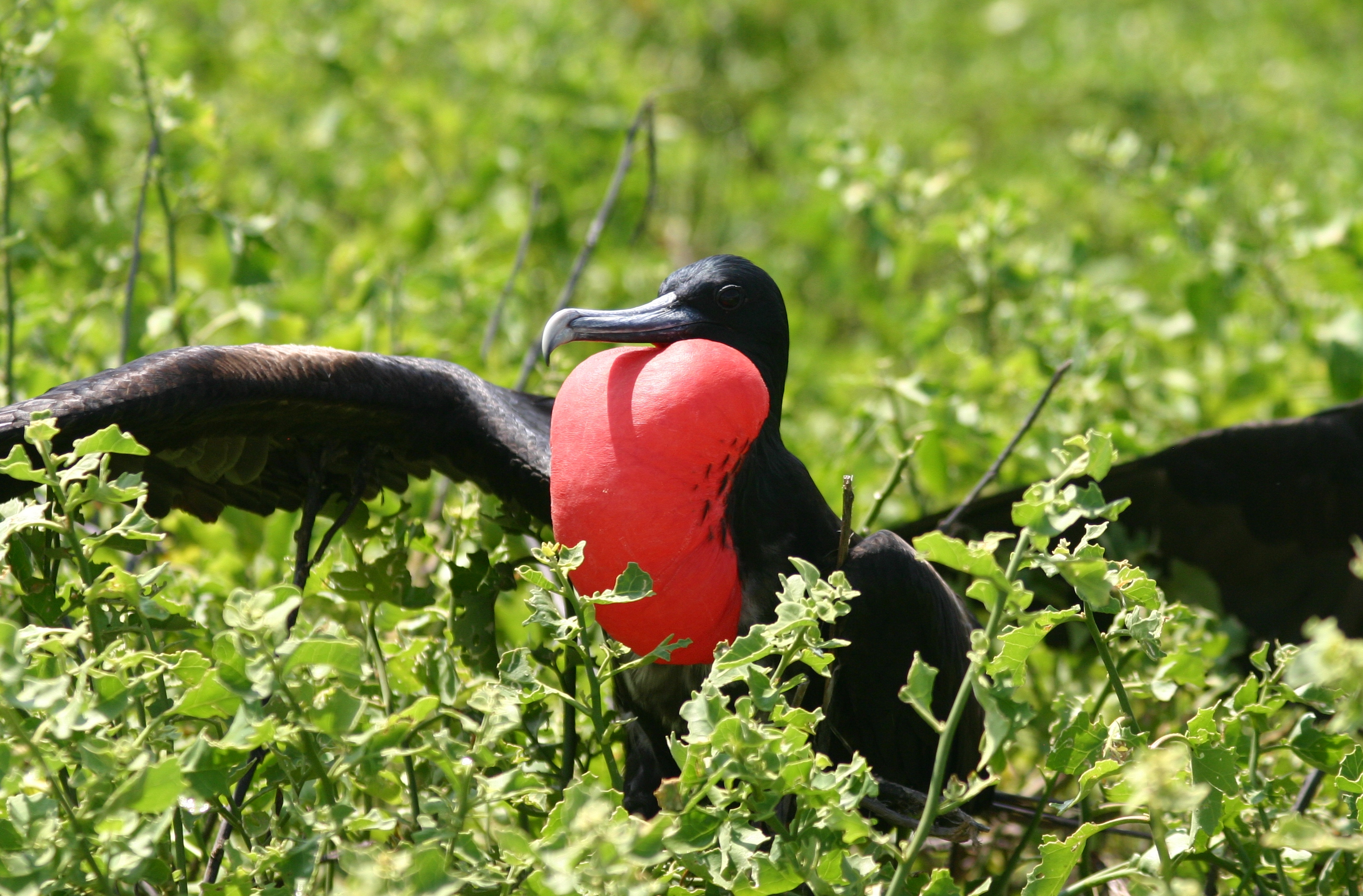
Male great frigatebird

Order: Suliformes Family: Fregatidae

Frigatebirds are large seabirds usually found over tropical oceans. They are large, black and white, or completely black, with long wings and deeply forked tails. The males have colored inflatable throat pouches. They do not swim or walk and cannot take off from a flat surface. They are essentially aerial, able to stay aloft for days at a time.

- Lesser frigatebird, Fregata ariel
- Great frigatebird, Fregata minor

== Boobies and gannets ==
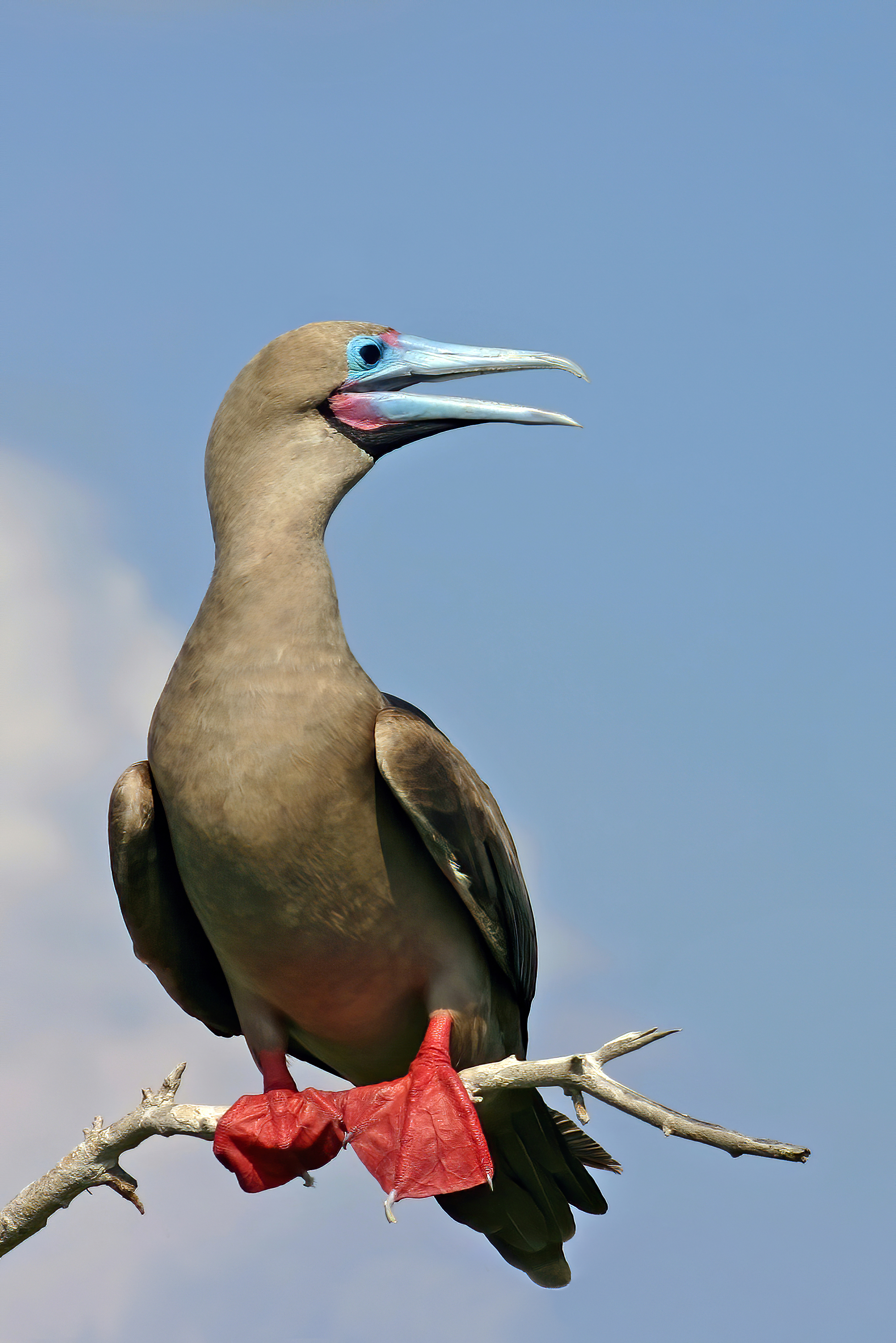
Brown morph of the red-footed booby

Order: Suliformes Family: Sulidae

The sulids comprise the gannets and boobies. Both groups are medium to large coastal seabirds that plunge-dive for fish.

- Masked booby, Sula dactylatra (A)
- Brown booby, Sula leucogaster
- Red-footed booby, Sula sula

== Herons, egrets, and bitterns ==
Order: Pelecaniformes Family: Ardeidae

The family Ardeidae contains the bitterns, herons, and egrets. Herons and egrets are medium to large wading birds with long necks and legs. Bitterns tend to be shorter-necked and warier. Members of Ardeidae fly with their necks retracted.

- Pacific reef-heron, Egretta sacra

== See also ==
- List of birds
- Lists of birds by region
- Funafuti Conservation Area
