= List of birds of Svalbard =

This list of birds of Svalbard includes 243 species as of October 2025, of which at least three are introduced.

Svalbard is an archipelago of islands in the North Sea. It currently is an unincorporated area of Norway. The largest island, Svalbard or Spitzbergen, is home to about 2,500 people. Other islands include Nordaustlandet, Bjørnøja and Edgeøya.

== Breeding status ==
- Abundant breeder (AB) – breeds annually, with >10,000 breeding pairs
- Common breeder (CB) – breeds annually, with <10,000 breeding pairs
- Irregular breeder (IB) – does not breed annually, and only a few pairs
- Dispersed breeder (DB) – breeds annually, but dispersedly
- Winter visitor (WV) – spends the winter months in Svalbard
- Annual (A) – found in small numbers every year
- Occasional (O) – rare, occasional visitor, not every year
- Vagrant (V) – rare, less than 20 records
- Rare vagrant (RV) – rare, less than 5 records
- Introduced (I) – either introduced purposely or accidentally by humans, or a bird that came to Svalbard with the assistance of humans

== Ducks, geese, swans, and eiders ==
Order: Anseriformes Family: Anatidae

English name	Norwegian name	Scientific name	Breeding status	Yearly abundance (if any)	Photo
Brent goose	Ringgås	Branta bernicla	CB	April–September	Ringelgans (Branta bernicla) – Spiekeroog, Nationalpark Niedersächsisches Wattenmeer
Red-breasted goose	Rødhalsgås	Branta ruficollis	RV		Red-breasted Goose (10545127284)
Canada goose	Kanadagås	Branta canadensis	I V		Canada_Goose_(Branta_Canadensis)
Cackling goose	Polargås	Branta huchinsii	V		Cackling_Goose_(Branta_hutchinsii)_(23942700903)
Barnacle goose	Hvitkinngås	Branta leucopsis	AB WV?	May–October	Barnacle_goose_(Branta_leucopsis)
Bar-headed goose	Stripegås	Anser indicus	I V		Bar-headed_Goose_(Anser_indicus)_(51145852044)
Snow goose	Snøgås	Anser caerulescens	A		Anser_caerulescens_CT4
Greylag goose	Grågås	Anser anser	A, possibly IB	May–August, seen year-round	Greylag Goose (Anser anser) - Bærum, Norway 2021-04-16
Taiga bean goose	Taigasædgås	Anser fabalis	V		Taiga_bean_goose_(53347585277)
Pink-footed goose	Kortnebbgås	Anser brachyrhynchus	AB		2018-10-06_Anser_brachyrhynchus,_Killingworth_Lake,_Northumberland_1
Tundra bean goose	Tundrasædgås	Anser serrirostris	O		Tundra_Bean_Goose_(Anser_serrirostris),_Norwick_-_geograph.org.uk_-_5367435
Greater white-fronted goose	Tundragås	Anser albifrons	A		Greater White-fronted Goose
Mute swan	Knoppsvane	Cygnus olor	RV		RO_IF_Pantelimon_lake_mute_swan_head_in_wings
Tundra swan	Dvergsvane	Cygnus columbianus	V		Tundra_Swan_(Cygnus_columbianus)_(13016737873)
Whooper swan	Sangsvane	Cygnus cygnus	A, IB (Bjørnøya)	June–July, seen year round	Cygnus_cygnus_Oulu_20240414_02
Common shelduck	Gravand	Tadorna tadorna	V		Common_shelduck_(Tadorna_tadorna)_male_2
Ruddy shelduck	Rustand	Tadorna ferruginea	RV		Ruddy_Shelduck_Chandratal_Spiti_Himachal_Jun18_D72_7911
Mandarin duck	Mandarinand	Aix galericulata	I RV		Mandarin_duck_(Aix_galericulata)
Baikal teal	Gulkinnand	Sibirionetta formosa	RV		Sibirionetta_formosa_01_(cropped)
Garganey	Knekkand	Spatula querquedula	RV		Female_garganey_(Spatula_querquedula)_in_Algeria
Blue-winged teal	Blåvingeand	Spatula discors	RV		Spatula_discors_f_Humber_Bay_Park_E_Toronto
Northern shoveler	Skjeand	Spatula clypeata	V	Year round, usually May–August	Northern_shoveler_12
Gadwall	Snadderand	Mareca strepera	V		Male_gadwall_in_Red_Hook_(61525)
Eurasian wigeon	Brunnakke	Mareca penelope	O, probably IB	May–August	Eurasian_wigeon_in_Sakai,_Osaka,_February_2016
Mallard	Stokkand	Anas platyrhynchos	A, probably IB		Anas_platyrhynchos_(Male)_in_Locarno_-_Frontal_view
Northern pintail	Stjertand	Anas acuta	A IB	May-August	Northern_pintail_at_Taudaha_Kathmandu
Common teal	Krikkand	Anas crecca	A IB	May-September	2015_Cyraneczka_zwyczajna_(samiec)
Green-winged teal	Amerikakrikkand	Anas carolinensis	RV		Green-winged_Teal_(8028160855)
Common pochard	Taffeland	Aythya ferina	RV		Common_Pochard_(Aythya_ferina)_(49049342462)
Ring-necked duck	Ringand	Aythya collaris	RV		Ring-Necked_Duck_at_Byrd_Park
Tufted duck	Toppand	Aythya fuligula	A	May-September	Aythya_fuligula_Hires
Greater scaup	Bergand	Aythya marila	V		2017-03-24 Aythya marila, male, Killingworth Lake, Northumberland 07
Steller's eider	Stellerand	Polysticta stelleri	O	May-July	Steller's_Eider_(Polysticta_stelleri)_(13667604773)
Spectacled eider	Brilleærfugl	Somateria fischeri	RV		Male spectacled eider feeding (51101430074)
King eider	Praktærfugl	Somateria spectabilis	CB	April-September	King_Eider_(Somateria_spectabilis)_(13667548395)
Common eider	Ærfugl	Somateria mollissima	AB	March-September, seen year round	Somateria_mollissima_male.
Harlequin	Harlekinand	Histrionicus histrionicus	V		Утка_каменушка_на_р._Карымчина
Velvet scoter	Sjøorre	Melanitta fusca	V		Melanitta fusca 1
White-winged scoter	Amerikasjøorre	Melanitta deglandi	RV		Melanitta_deglandi_male_by_Don_Faulkner
Common scoter	Svartand	Melanitta nigra	A, probably CB	May-July	Sjöorre_-_Common_Scoter_3
Long-tailed duck	Havelle	Clangula hyemalis	CB	April-September, seen year round	Clangula_hyemalis
Common goldeneye	Kvinand	Bucephala clangula	O		Common_Goldeneye_(Bucephala_clangula)-_female
Barrow's goldeneye	Islandsand	Bucephala islandindica	RV		Bucephala_islandica-3
Smew	Lappfiskand	Mergellus albellus	RV		Smew_(Mergellus_albellus)
Goosander	Laksand	Mergus merganser	RV		Male Goosander 3 (4248116814)
Red-breasted merganser	Siland	Mergus serrator	O, probably DB		Mergus serratorRed-breastedMerganserMittelsäger 07

== Pheasants, grouse, and partridges ==
Order: Galliformes Family: Phasianidae

English name	Norwegian name	Scientific name	Breeding status	Yearly abundance (if any)	Photo
Svalbard rock ptarmigan	Svalbardrype	Lagopus muta hyperboreus	CB WV	January-December	Svalbard_rock_ptarmigan_svalbardrype_pho_w_5266

== Swifts ==
Order: Apodiformes Family: Apodidae

English name	Norwegian name	Scientific name	Breeding status	Yearly abundance (if any)	Photo
Common swift	Tårnseiler	Apus apus	V		Common_Swift_Apus_apus

== Cuckoos ==
Order: Cuculiformes Family: Cuculidae

English name	Norwegian name	Scientific name	Breeding status	Yearly abundance (if any)	Photo
Common cuckoo	Gjøk	Cuculus canorus	RV		Cuculus_canorus_vogelartinfo_chris_romeiks_CHR0431_(cropped)

== Doves and pigeons ==
Order: Columbiformes Family: Columbidae

English name	Norwegian name	Scientific name	Breeding status	Yearly abundance (if any)	Photo
Feral pigeon	Bydue	Columba livia (feral)	RV		Street pigeon (back) Drammen
Common wood pigeon	Ringdue	Columba palumbus	V		Common Wood Pigeon - Columba palumbus
European turtle dove	Turteldue	Streptopelia turtur	RV		Tourterelle_des_bois_Sud_de_la_Tunisie
Eurasian collared dove	Tykerdue	Streptopelia decaocto	RV		Streptopelia decaocto - Eurasian Collared Dove 05

== Rails and crakes ==
Order: Gruiformes Family: Rallidae

English name	Norwegian name	Scientific name	Breeding status	Yearly abundance (if any)	Photo
Water rail	Vannrikse	Rallus aquaticus	RV		Wasserralle_Bodensee
Corn crake	Åkerrikse	Crex crex	RV		Crex_crex,_Beachy_Head_4
Common moorhen	Sivhøne	Gallinula chloropus	RV		Common_moorhen_(Gallinula_chloropus)_France
Eurasian coot	Sothøne	Fulica atra	RV		Eurasian_coot_(Fulica_atra)_05

== Cranes ==
Order: Gruiformes Family: Gruidae

English name	Norwegian name	Scientific name	Breeding status	Yearly abundance (if any)	Photo
Common crane	Trane	Grus grus	V		Kraanvogel_-_common_crane_-_Grus_grus_2

== Grebes ==
Order: Podicipediformes Family: Podicipedidae

English name	Norwegian name	Scientific name	Breeding status	Yearly abundance (if any)	Photo
Red-necked grebe	Gråstrupedykker	Podiceps grisegena	RV		Podiceps grisegena (32822613764)
Slavonian grebe	Horndykker	Podiceps auritus	RV		Podiceps_auritus_(13909575538)_(cropped)

== Oystercatchers ==
Order: Charadriformes Family: Haematopodidae

English name	Norwegian name	Scientific name	Breeding status	Yearly abundance (if any)	Photo
Eurasian oystercatcher	Tjeld	Haematopus ostralegus	A	March-August	Eurasian_Oystercatcher_(Haematopus_ostralegus)_-_Giske,_Norway_2022-07-02_(02)

== Plovers and lapwings ==
Order: Charadriformes Family: Charadriidae

English name	Norwegian name	Scientific name	Breeding status	Yearly abundance (if any)	Photo
Northern lapwing	Vipe	Vanellus vanellus	O		Vipe_fra_Lista
European golden plover	Heilo	Pluvialis apricaria	DB	Late April- September	Heilo_(Pluvialis_apricaria)
Pacific golden plover	Sibirlo	Pluvialis fulva	V IB		Pacific_Golden_Plover_(Pluvialis_fulva)_(53891992800)
American golden plover	Kanadalo	Pluvialis dominica	RV		American_Golden_Plover_(7458261558)
Grey plover	Tundralo	Pluvialis squatarola	V		Breeding_plumage_Black-bellied_plover_(Pluvialis_squatarola)_Great_Bay_Wildlife_Management_Area,_New_Jersey,_USA
Common ringed plover	Sandlo	Charadrius hiaticula	DB	May- September	Common_ringed_plover_(Charadrius_hiaticula)_Oppdal
Eurasian dotterel	Boltit	Charadrius morinellus	RV		Female_Dotterel_with_chick_-_only_4th_record_ever
Eurasian whimbrel	Småspove	Numenius phaeopus	A	May- August	Whimbrel_Numenius_phaeopus
Eurasian curlew	Storspove	Numenius arquata	V		Numenius_arquata_amk
Bar-tailed godwit	Lappspove	Limosa lapponica	RV		Limosa_lapponica_ar
Icelandic black-tailed godwit	Svarthalespove	Limosa limosa islandica	O V	May - June	Icelandic_black-tailed_godwit_(Limosa_limosa_islandica)
Ruddy turnstone	Steinvender	Arenaria interpres	DB	May- September	Arenaria_interpres_no
Red knot	Polarsnipe	Calidris canutus	A DB	May- September	Calidris_canutus_no
Ruff	Brushane	Calidris pugnax	V		Brushane_Ruff_(20324184796)
Curlew sandpiper	Tundrasnipe	Calidris ferruginea	V		Calidris_ferruginea,_winter_adult,_Pak_Thale
