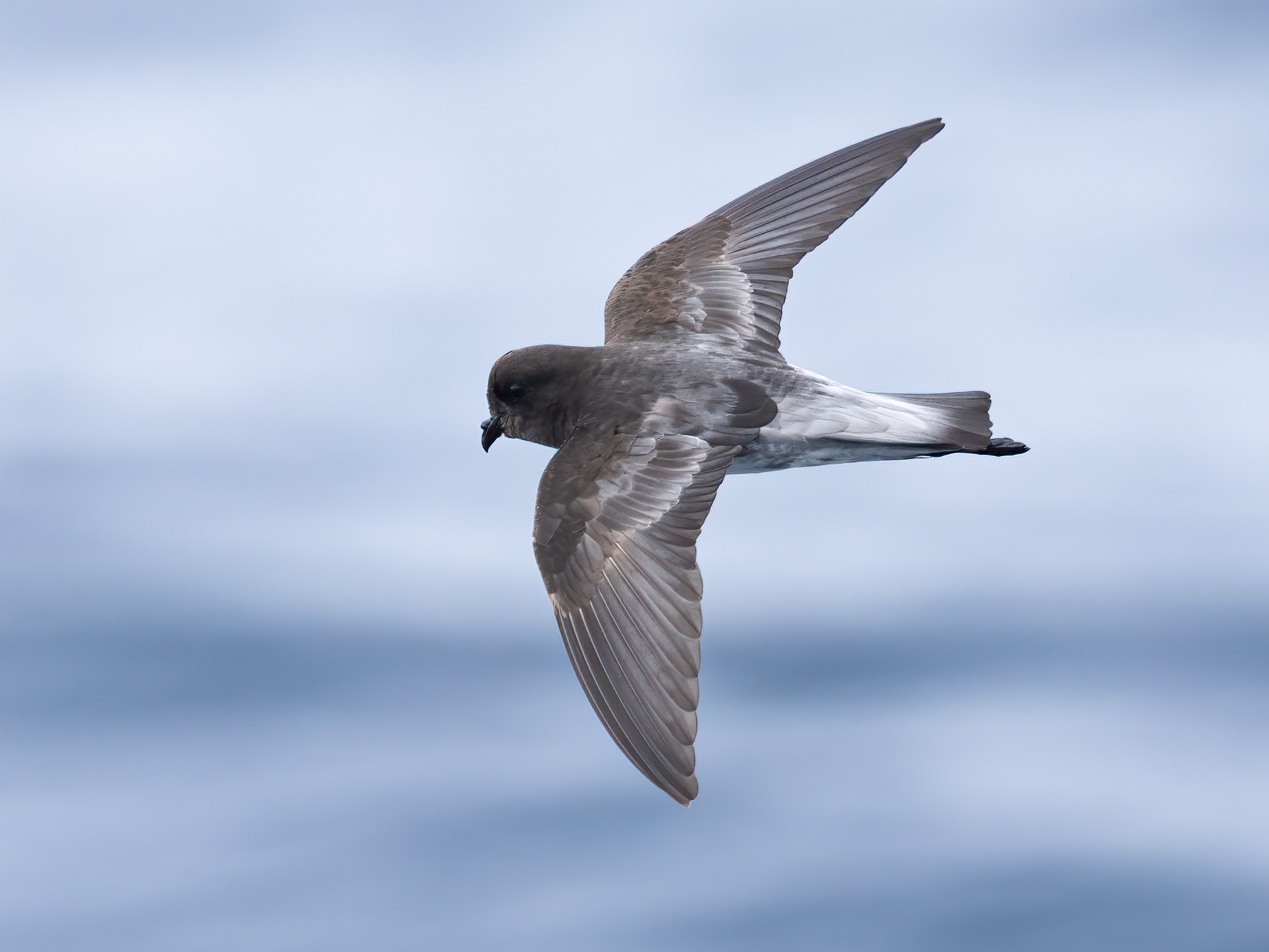

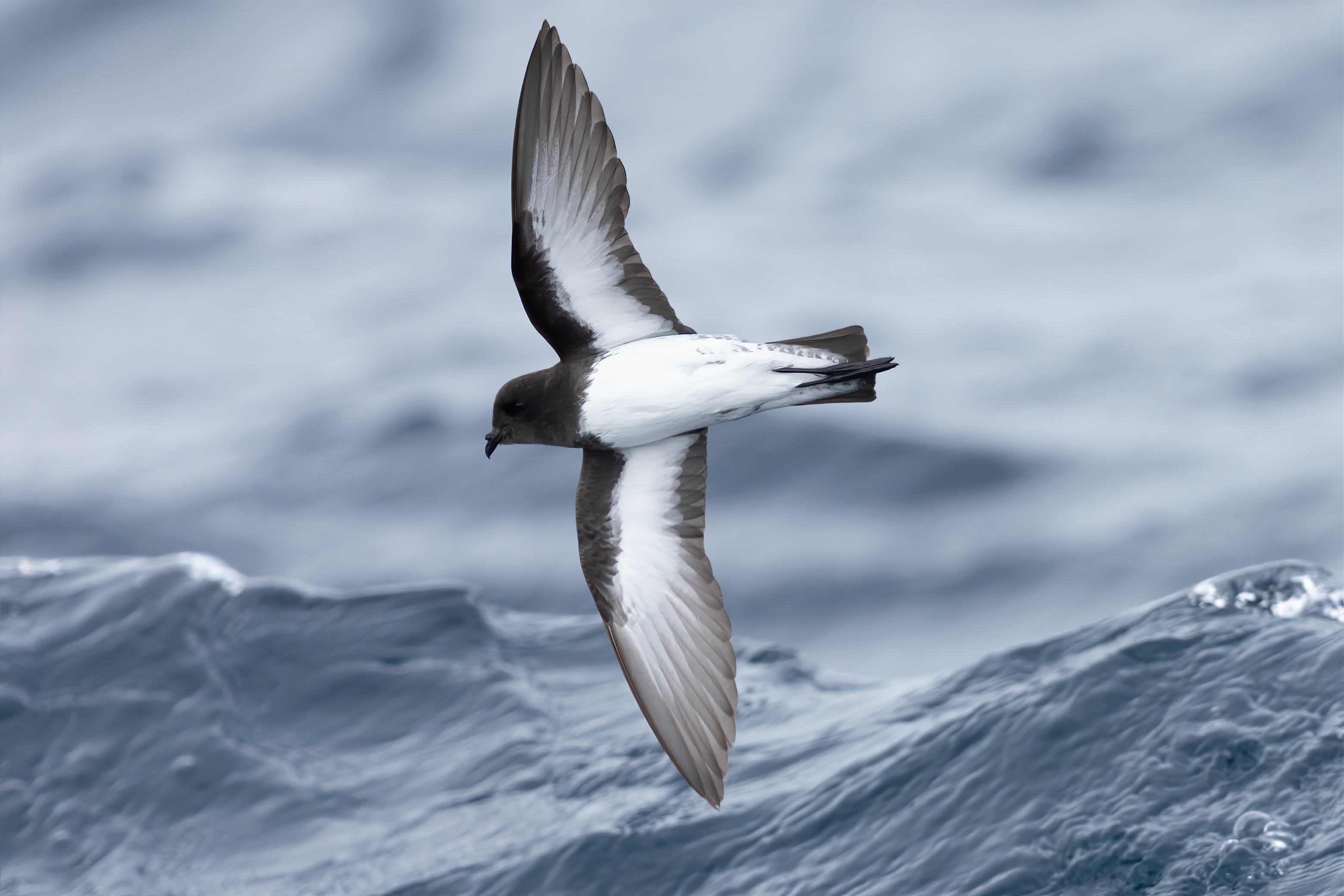

Conservation status
- Least Concern (IUCN 3.1)

Scientific classification
- Kingdom: Animalia
- Phylum: Chordata
- Class: Aves
- Order: Procellariiformes
- Family: Oceanitidae
- Genus: Garrodia; Forbes, WA, 1881
- Species: G. nereis

Binomial name
- Garrodia nereis (Gould, 1841)
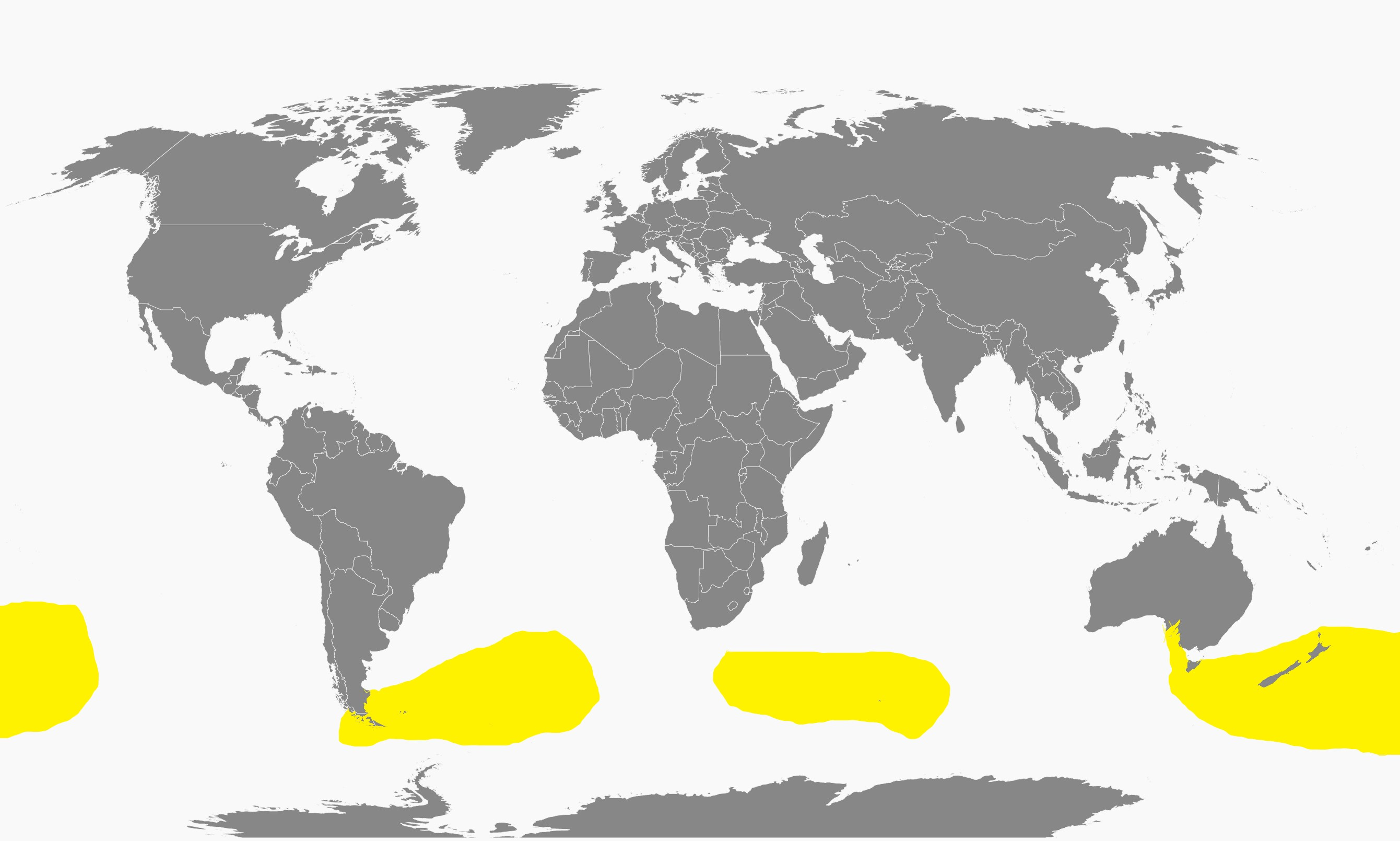

Synonyms
- Oceanites nereis

= Grey-backed storm petrel =

Species of bird

The grey-backed storm petrel (Garrodia nereis) is a species of seabird in the austral storm petrel family Oceanitidae. It is monotypic within the genus Garrodia. It is found in Antarctica, Argentina, Australia, Chile, Falkland Islands, French Southern Territories, New Zealand, Saint Helena, South Africa, and South Georgia and the South Sandwich Islands. Its natural habitat is open seas. It is highly attracted to bright lights, especially in conditions of low visibility.

== Taxonomy ==
The genus Garrodia was created by William Alexander Forbes in 1881 and named after English zoologist Alfred Henry Garrod, while the specific descriptor is an allusion to the Nereids, the sea nymphs of Greek mythology.

== Description ==
Grey-backed storm petrel is a small bird, 21-44 g in weight with a 39–40 cm wingspan. Like others in its family it is dark grey overall with a black head and belly, but it can be distinguished from other storm-petrels in its range by its light grey rump compared to the white rump on others. The Grey-backed petrel has a pale back, black legs, a square tail and a white belly.

== Distribution ==
The grey-backed storm petrel has a distribution in the subantarctic in three disjunct populations, with one off of South America, one off of South Africa, and one off of Australia. It breeds in the Falkland Islands, Chatham Islands, Gough Island, Crozet Islands, Kerguelen Island, the New Zealand Subantarctic Islands, and Fiordland on the New Zealand mainland.

The first fossil record of Garrodia nereis was found in rock shelter called Te Waka #1, 900 m above sea level in inland Hawke's Bay, North Island, New Zealand.

== Behaviour ==
Grey-backed storm petrels are mostly solitary during the non-breeding season. They breed in large colonies from August to March, where they share parental duties.
