= List of birds of Lakshadweep =

This article lists the species of bird found in Lakshadweep. 134 species of birds have been sighted on the islands. The state bird of Lakshadweep is the brown noddy. This list's taxonomic treatment (designation and sequence of orders, families and species) and nomenclature (common and scientific names) follow the conventions of the IOC World Bird List, version 11.2. This list also uses British English throughout. Any bird names or other wording follows that convention.

The following tags have been used to highlight several categories. The commonly occurring native species do not fit within any of these categories.

- (A) Accidental - also known as a rarity, it refers to a species that rarely or accidentally occurs in Lakshadweep - typically less than ten confirmed records
- (I) Introduced - a species introduced to Lakshadweep as a consequence, direct or indirect, of human actions.

== Ducks, geese and swans ==
Order: Anseriformes Family: Anatidae

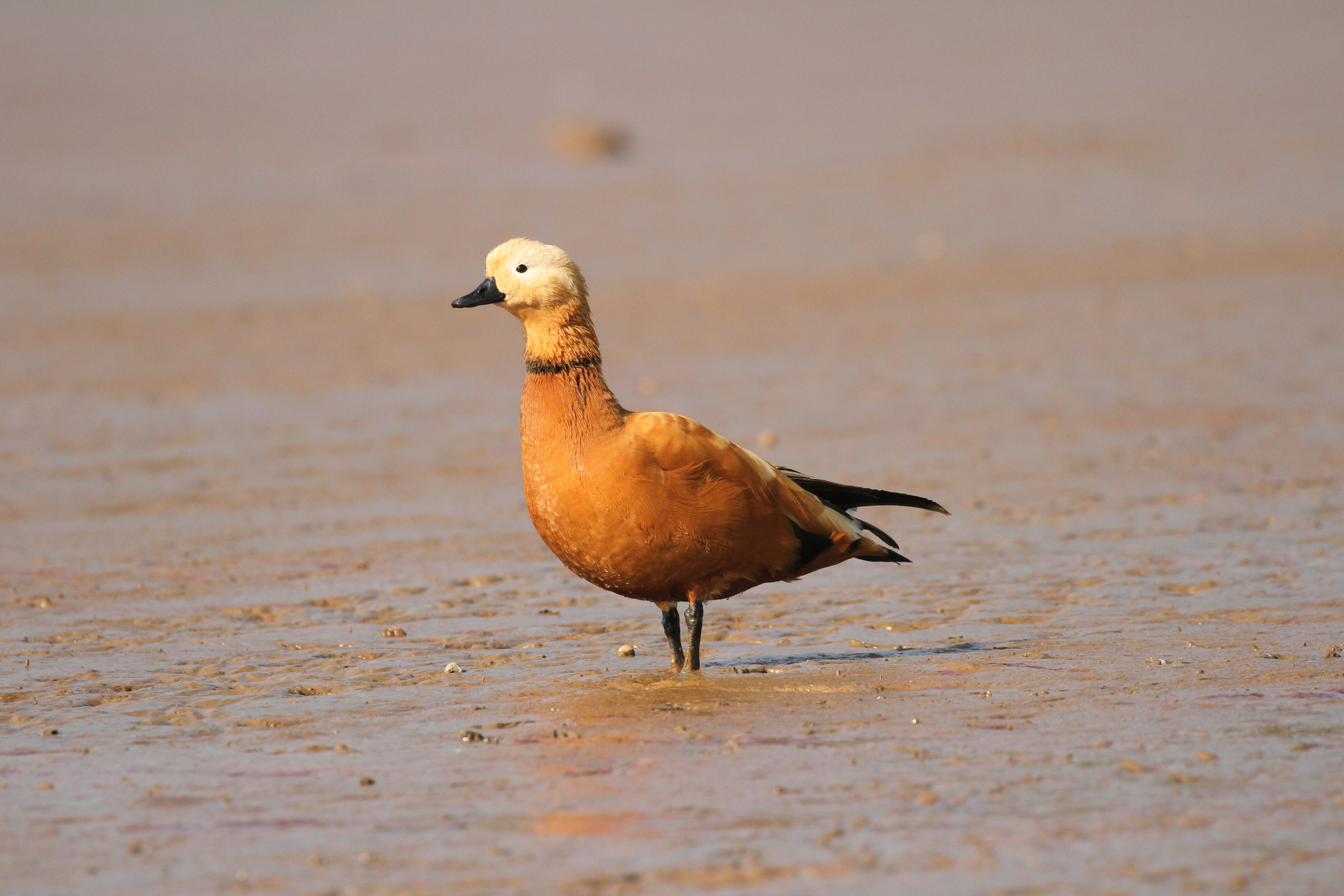
Ruddy shelduck

Anatidae includes the ducks and most duck-like waterfowl, such as geese and swans. These birds are adapted to an aquatic existence with webbed feet, flattened bills, and feathers that are excellent at shedding water due to an oily coating.

Common name	Binomial	Comments
Ruddy shelduck	Tadorna ferruginea	
Garganey	Spatula querquedula	
Northern pintail	Anas acuta	
Eurasian teal	Anas crecca	
Tufted duck	Aythya fuligula	

== Pigeons and doves ==
Order: Columbiformes Family: Columbidae

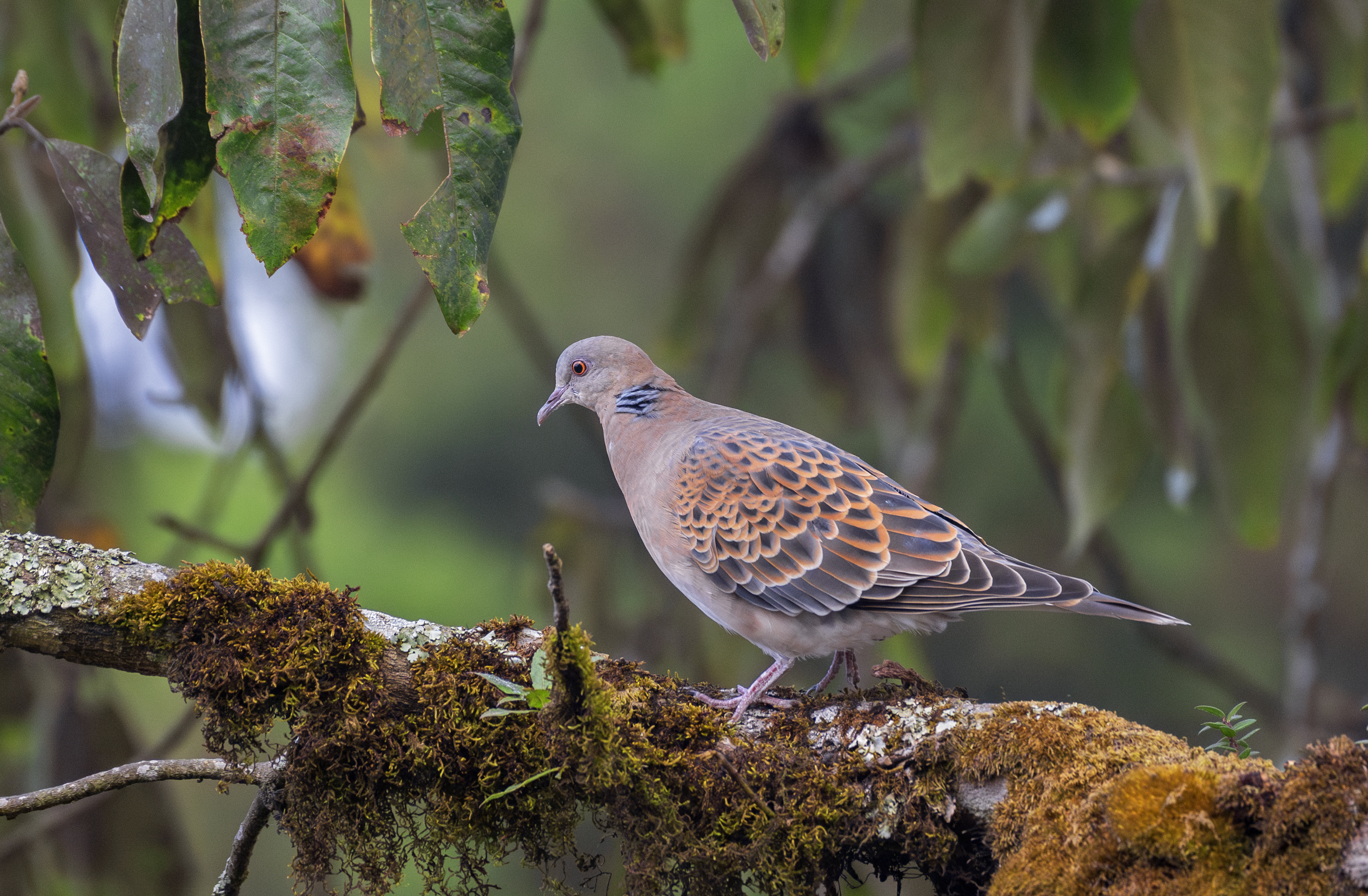
Oriental turtle dove

Pigeons and doves are stout-bodied birds with short necks and short slender bills with a fleshy cere.

Common name	Binomial	Comments
Rock dove	Columba livia	(I)
Oriental turtle dove	Streptopelia orientalis	

== Cuckoos ==
Order: Cuculiformes Family: Cuculidae

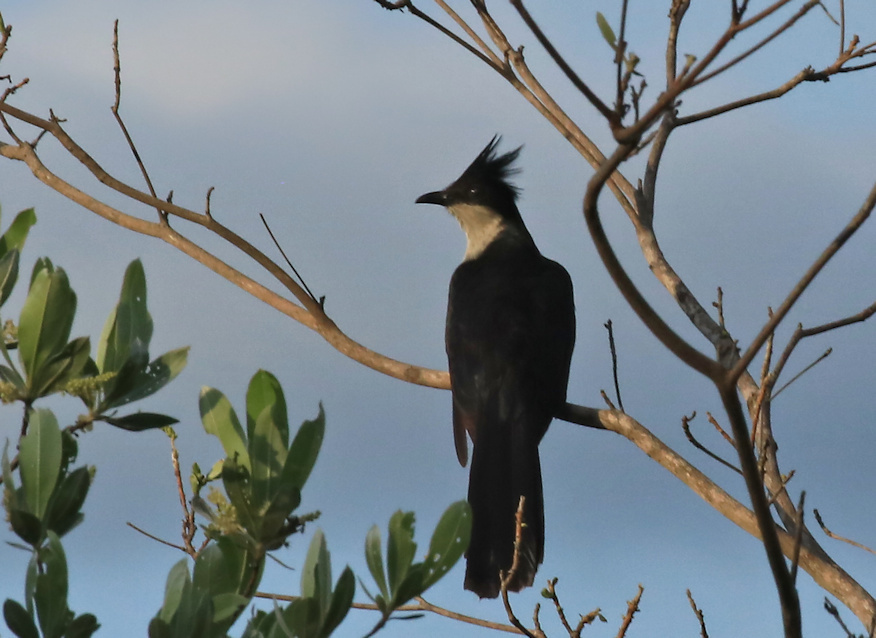
Jacobin cuckoo

The family Cuculidae includes cuckoos, roadrunners and anis. These birds are of variable size with slender bodies, long tails and strong legs. Many are brood parasites.

Common name	Binomial	Comments
Jacobin cuckoo	Clamator jacobinus	
Asian koel	Eudynamys scolopaceus	
Grey-bellied cuckoo	Cacomantis passerinus	
Common cuckoo	Cuculus canorus	

== Nightjars ==
Order: Caprimulgiformes Family: Caprimulgidae

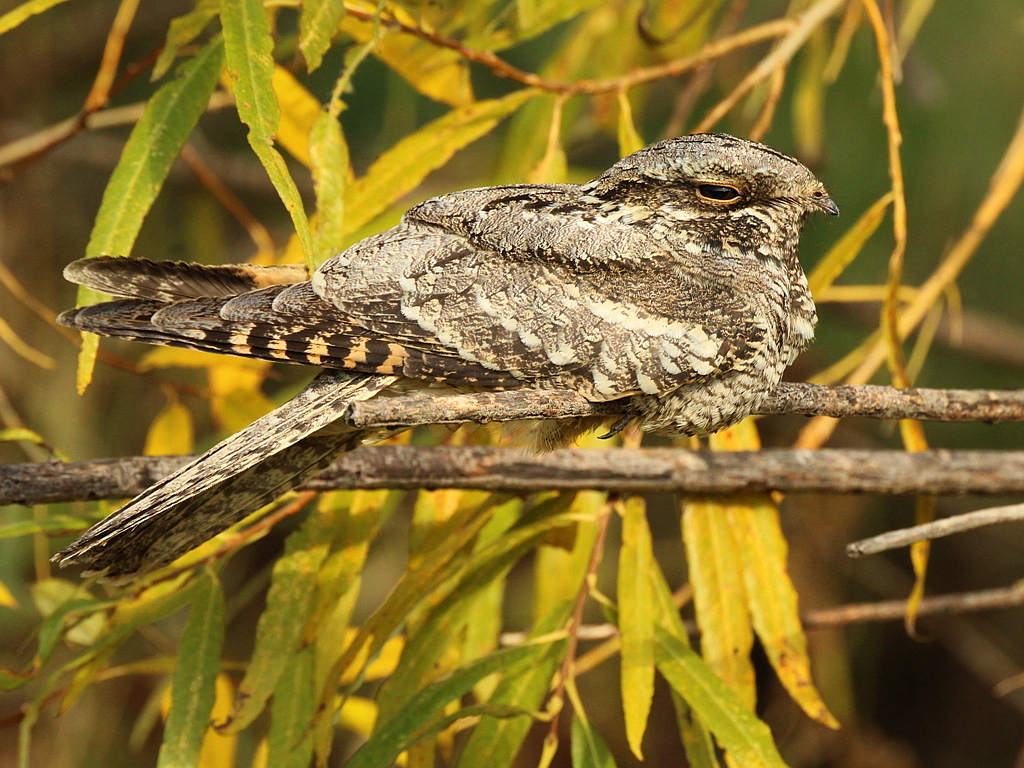
European nightjar

Nightjars are medium-sized nocturnal birds that usually nest on the ground. They have long wings, short legs and very short bills. Most have small feet, of little use for walking, and long pointed wings. Their soft plumage is camouflaged to resemble bark or leaves.

Common name	Binomial	Comments
European nightjar	Caprimulgus europaeus	(A)

== Swifts ==
Order: Apodiformes Family: Apodidae

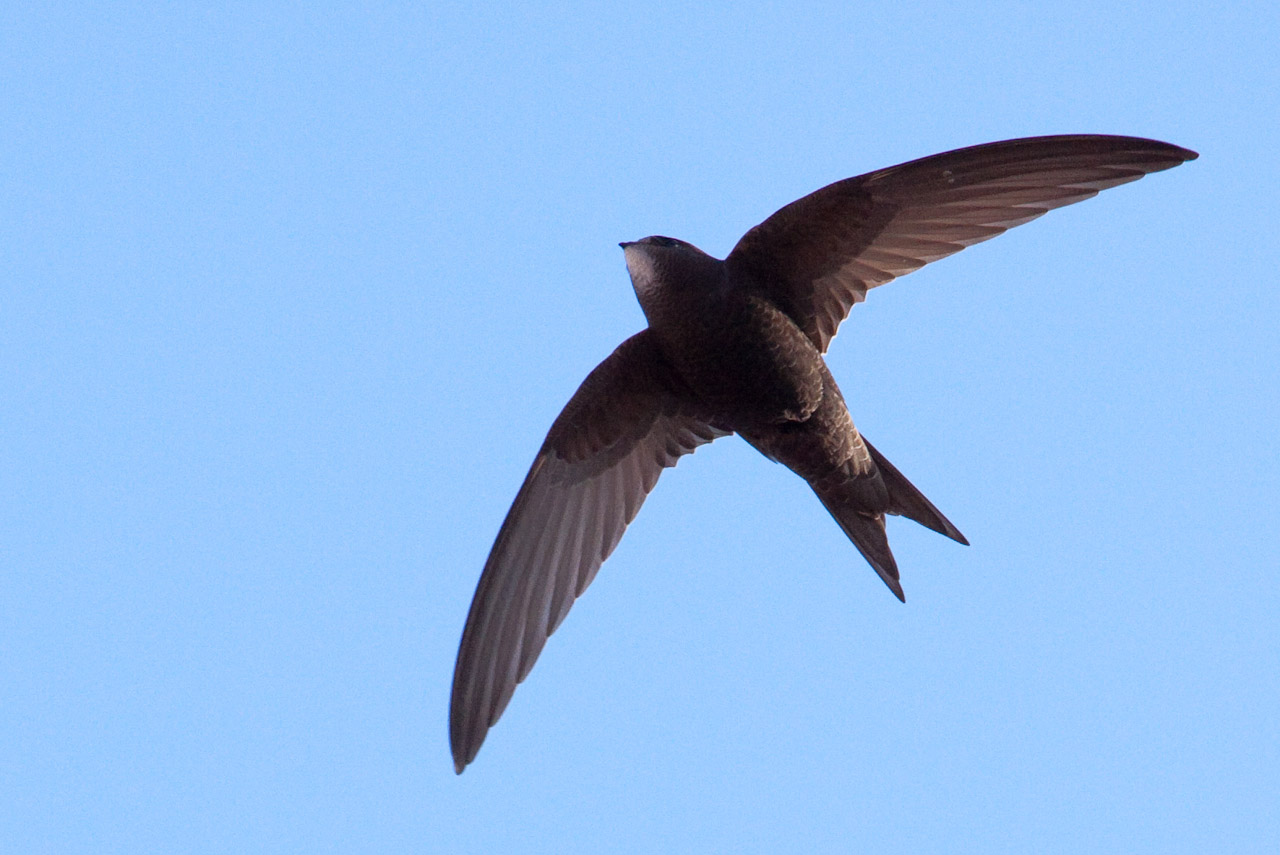
Common swift

Swifts are small birds which spend the majority of their lives flying. These birds have very short legs and never settle voluntarily on the ground, perching instead only on vertical surfaces. Many swifts have long swept-back wings which resemble a crescent or boomerang.

Common name	Binomial	Comments
Common swift	Apus apus	
Little swift	Apus affinis	

== Rails, crakes and coots ==
Order: Gruiformes Family: Rallidae

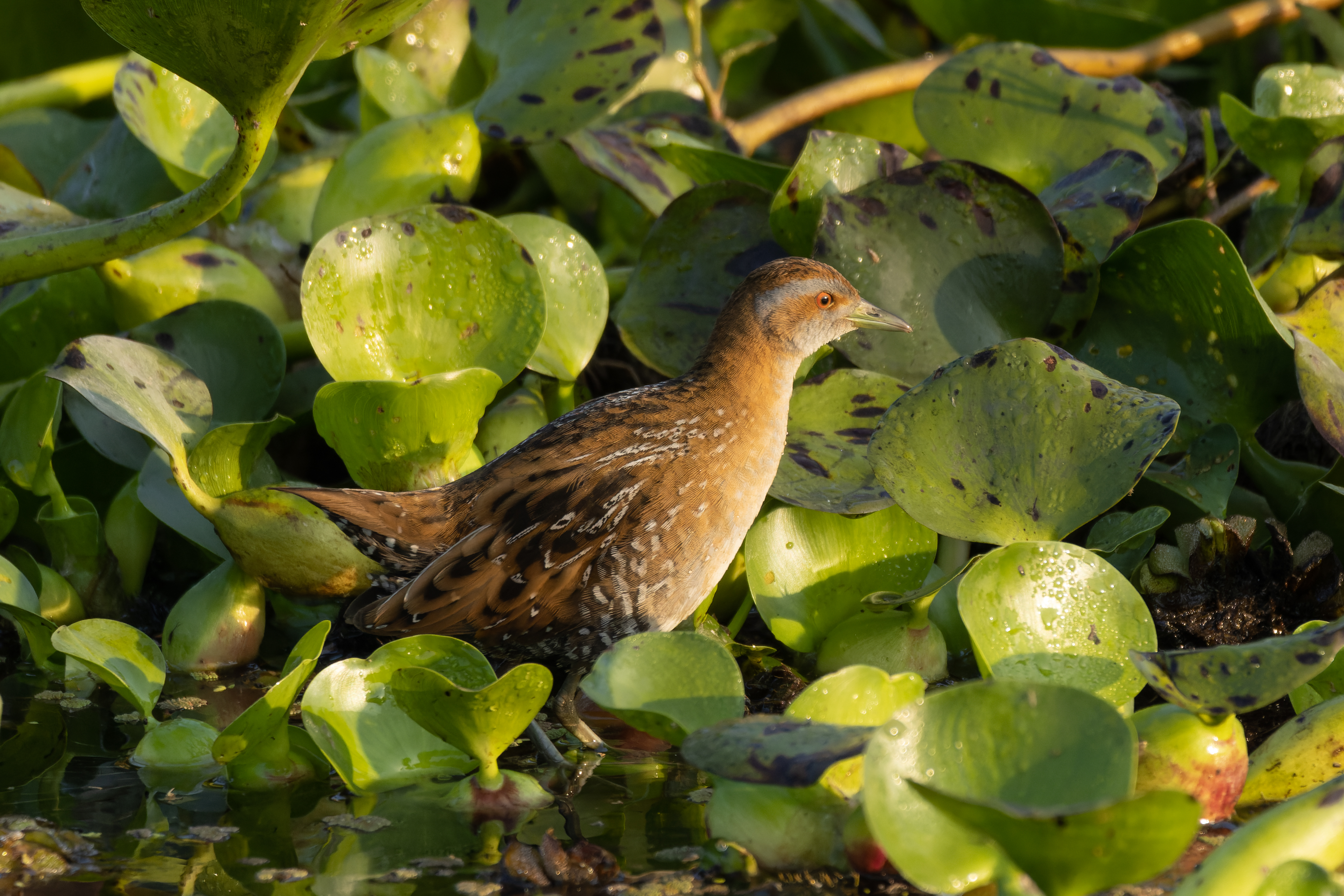
Baillon's crake

Rallidae is a large family of small to medium-sized birds which includes the rails, crakes, coots and gallinules. Typically they inhabit dense vegetation in damp environments near lakes, swamps or rivers. In general they are shy and secretive birds, making them difficult to observe. Most species have strong legs and long toes which are well adapted to soft uneven surfaces. They tend to have short, rounded wings and to be weak fliers.

Common name	Binomial	Comments
Eurasian moorhen	Gallina chloropus	
Eurasian coot	Fulica atra	
Watercock	Gallicrex cinerea	
White-breasted waterhen	Amaurornis phoenicurus	
Baillon's crake	Zapornia pusilla	

== Stilts and avocets ==
Order: Charadriiformes Family: Recurvirostridae

Recurvirostridae is a family of large wading birds, which includes the avocets and stilts. The avocets have long legs and long up-curved bills. The stilts have extremely long legs and long, thin, straight bills.

Common name	Binomial	Comments
Black-winged stilt	Himantopus himantopus	

== Plovers ==
Order: Charadriiformes Family: Charadriidae

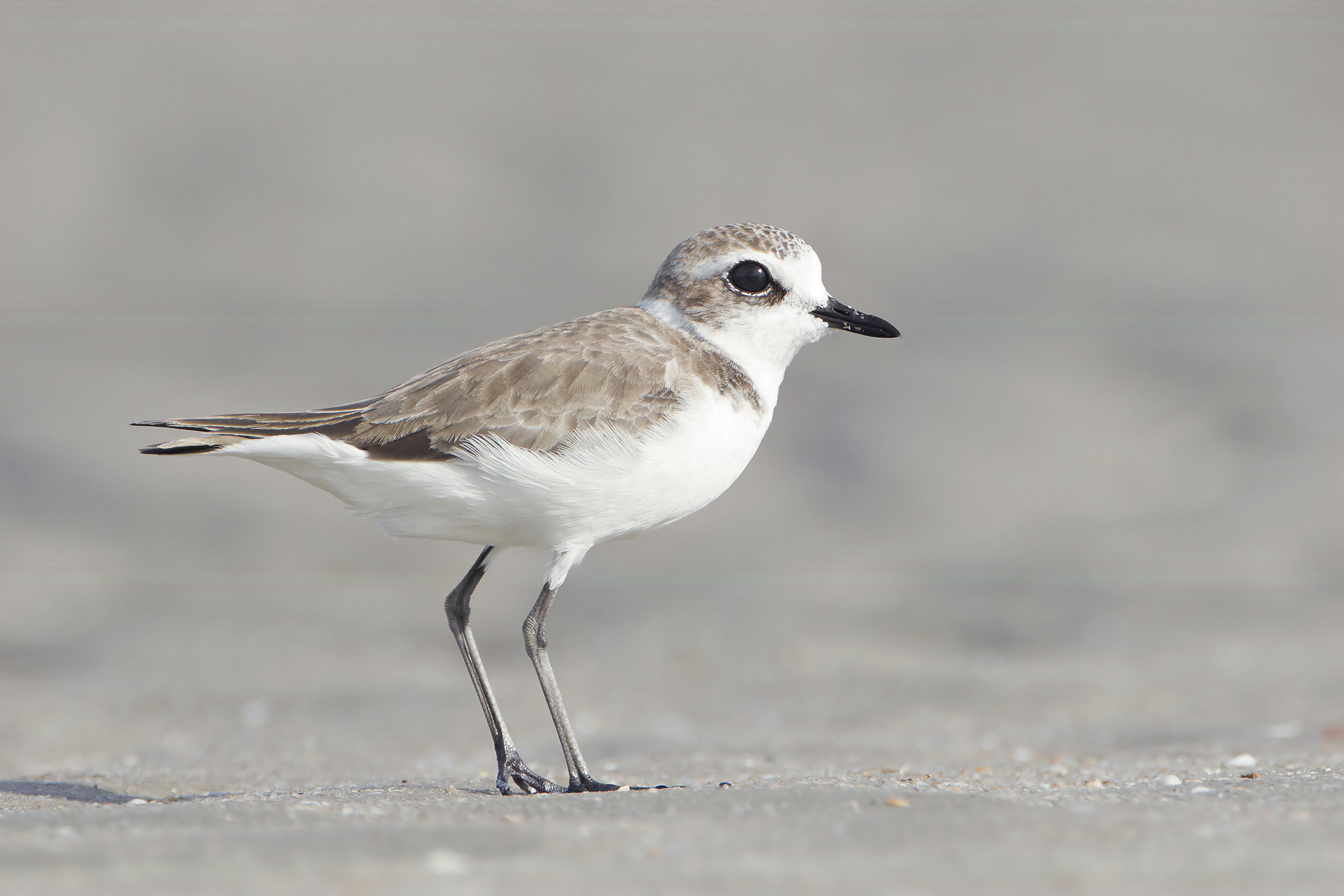
Siberian sand plover

The family Charadriidae includes the plovers, dotterels and lapwings. They are small to medium-sized birds with compact bodies, short, thick necks and long, usually pointed, wings. They are found in open country worldwide, mostly in habitats near water.

Common name	Binomial	Comments
Pacific golden plover	Pluvialis fulva	
Grey plover	Pluvialis squatarola	Vulnerable
Caspian plover	Anarhynchus asiaticus	(A)
Kentish plover	Charadrius alexandrinus	
Siberian sand plover	Charadrius mongolus	Endangered
Tibetan sand plover	Charadrius atrifrons	
Greater sand plover	Charadrius leschenaultii	

== Sandpipers and snipes ==
Order: Charadriiformes Family: Scolopacidae

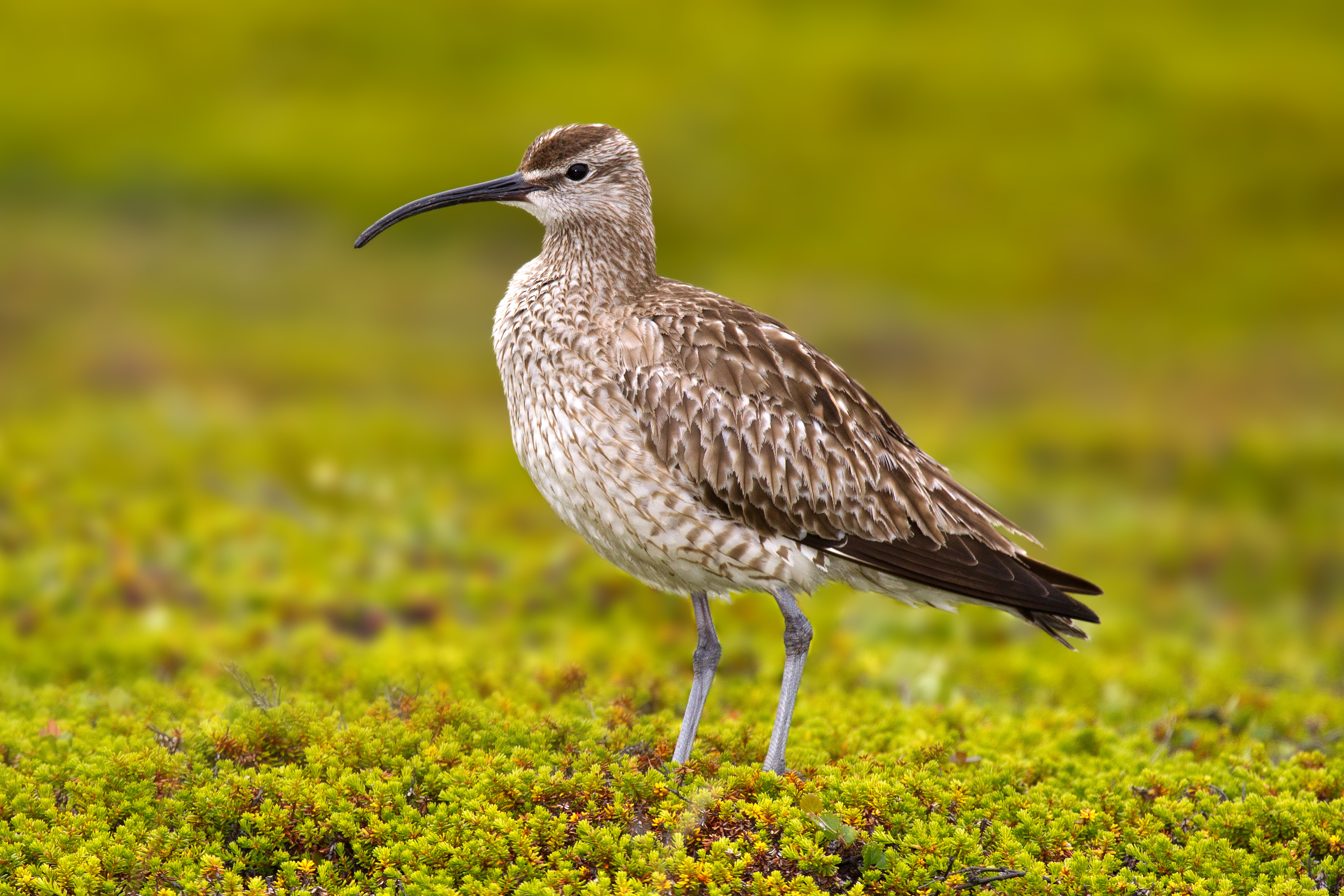
Eurasian whimbrel

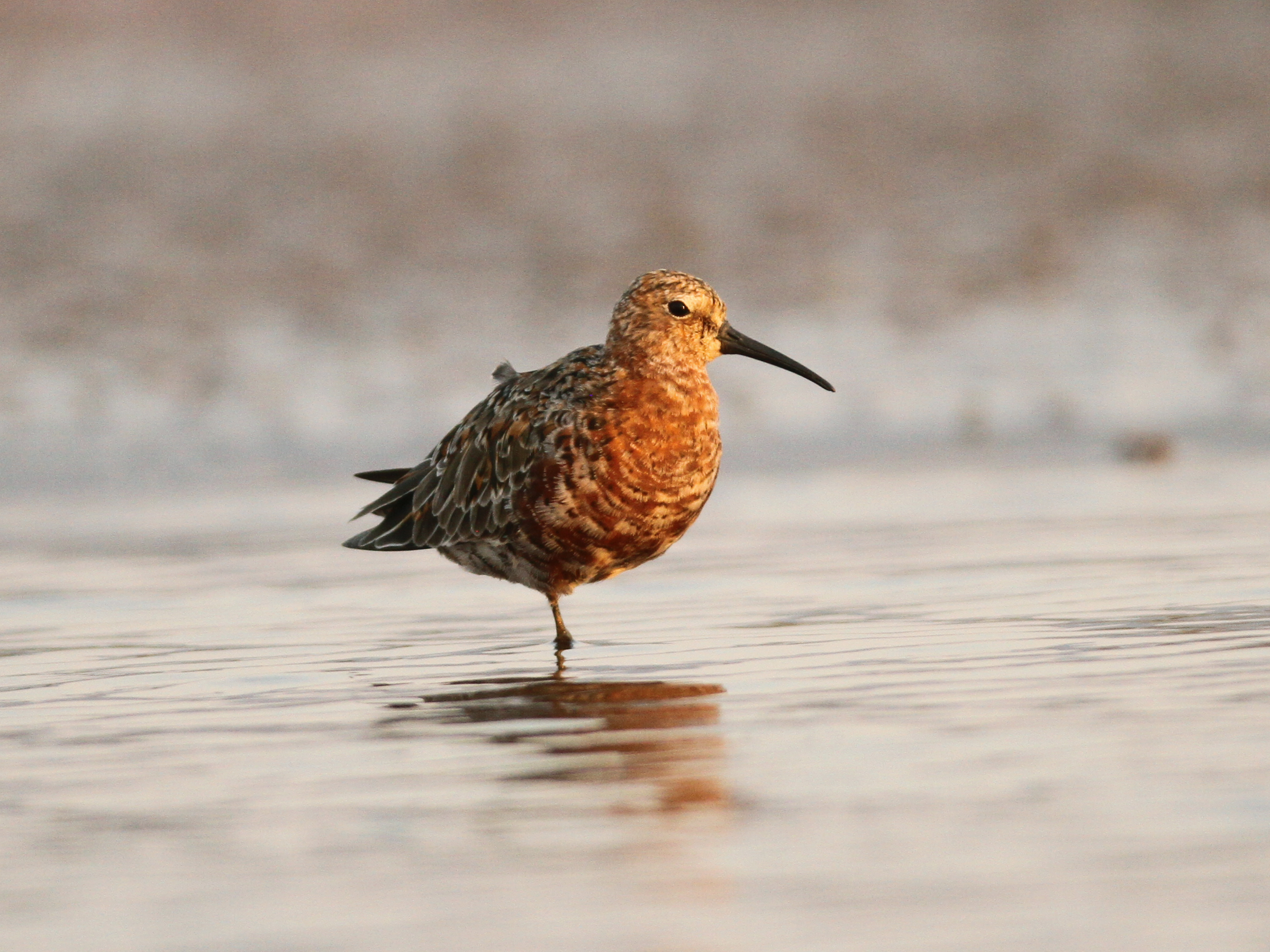
Curlew sandpiper

Scolopacidae is a large diverse family of small to medium-sized shorebirds including the sandpipers, curlews, godwits, shanks, tattlers, woodcocks, snipes, dowitchers and phalaropes. The majority of these species eat small invertebrates picked out of the mud or soil. Variation in length of legs and bills enables multiple species to feed in the same habitat, particularly on the coast, without direct competition for food.

Common name	Binomial	Comments
Eurasian whimbrel	Numenius phaeopus	
Eurasian curlew	Numenius arquata	Near-threatened
Bar-tailed godwit	Limosa lapponica	Near-threatened
Black-tailed godwit	Limosa limosa	Near-threatened
Ruddy turnstone	Arenaria interpres	Near-threatened
Curlew sandpiper	Calidris ferruginea	Vulnerable
Temminck's stint	Calidris temminckii	
Sanderling	Calidris alba	
Dunlin	Calidris alpina	Near-threatened
Little stint	Calidris minuta	
Common snipe	Gallinago gallinago	(A)
Terek sandpiper	Xenus cinereus	
Common sandpiper	Actitis hypoleucos	
Green sandpiper	Tringa ochropus	
Common redshank	Tringa totanus	
Marsh sandpiper	Tringa stagnatilis	(A)
Wood sandpiper	Tringa glareola	
Common greenshank	Tringa nebularia	

== Crab-plover ==
Order: Charadriiformes Family: Dromadidae

The crab-plover is related to the waders. It resembles a plover but with very long grey legs and a strong heavy black bill similar to a tern. It has black-and-white plumage, a long neck, partially webbed feet and a bill designed for eating crabs.

Common name	Binomial	Comments
Crab-plover	Dromas ardeola	(A)

== Coursers and pratincoles ==
Order: Charadriiformes Family: Glareolidae

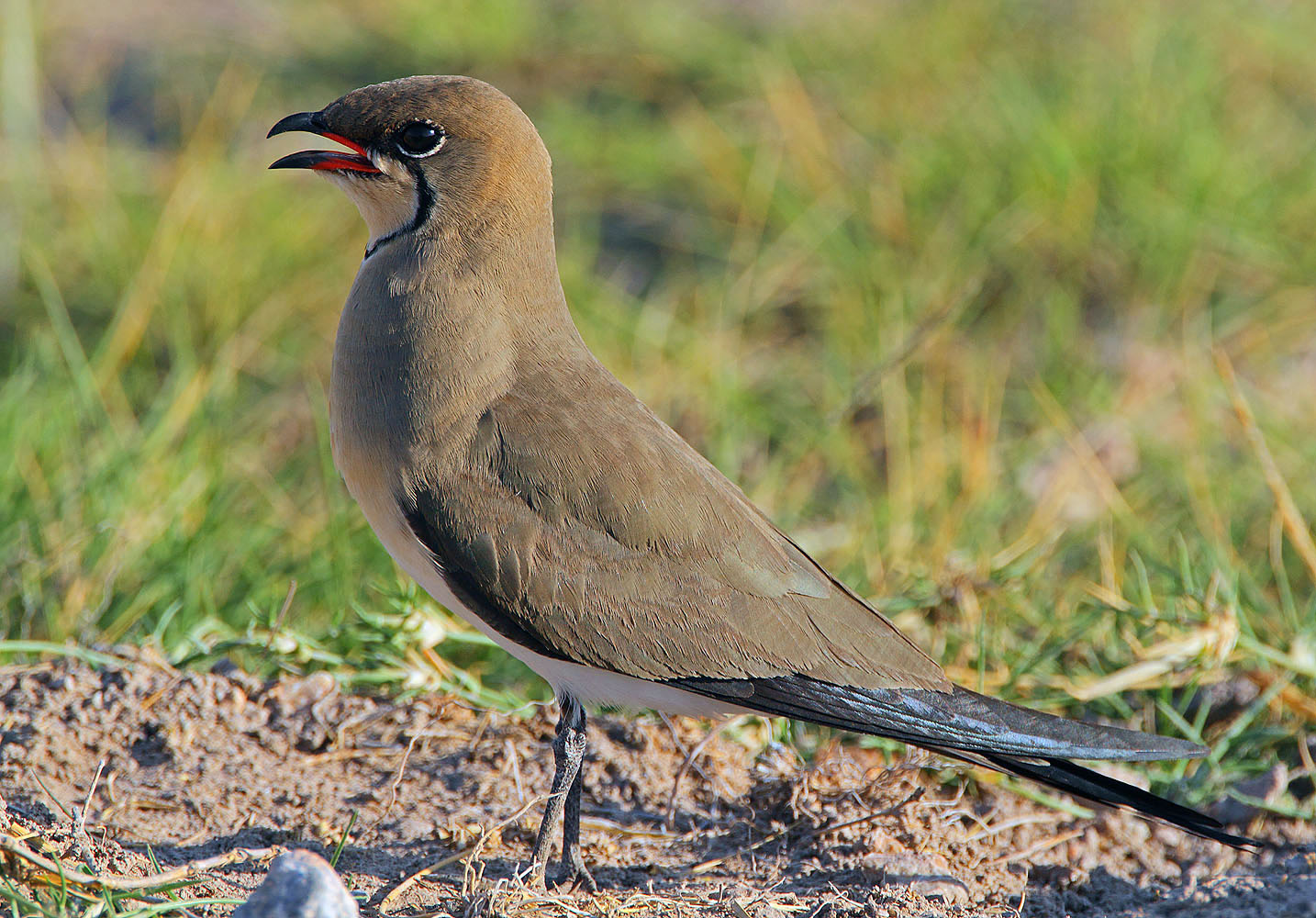
Collared pratincole

Glareolidae is a family of wading birds comprising the pratincoles, which have short legs, long pointed wings and long forked tails, and the coursers, which have long legs, short wings and long, pointed bills which curve downwards.

Common name	Binomial	Comments
Collared pratincole	Glareola pratincola	
Oriental pratincole	Glareola maldivarum	

== Skuas ==
Order: Charadriiformes Family: Stercorariidae

The family Stercorariidae are, in general, medium to large birds, typically with grey or brown plumage, often with white markings on the wings. They nest on the ground in temperate and arctic regions and are long-distance migrants.

Common name	Binomial	Comments
Pomarine jaeger	Stercorarius pomarinus	

== Gulls, terns and skimmers ==
Order: Charadriiformes Family: Laridae

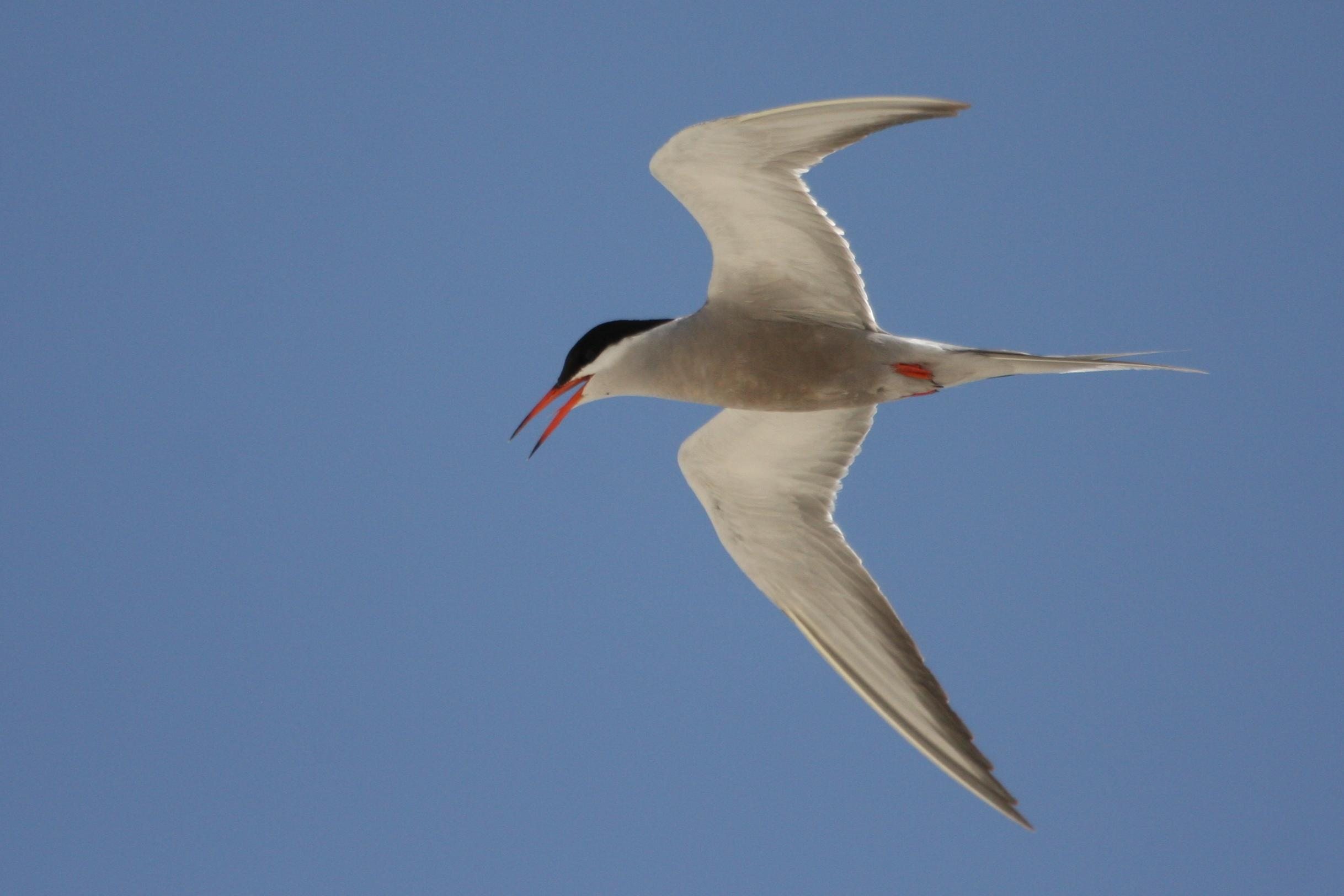
White-cheeked tern

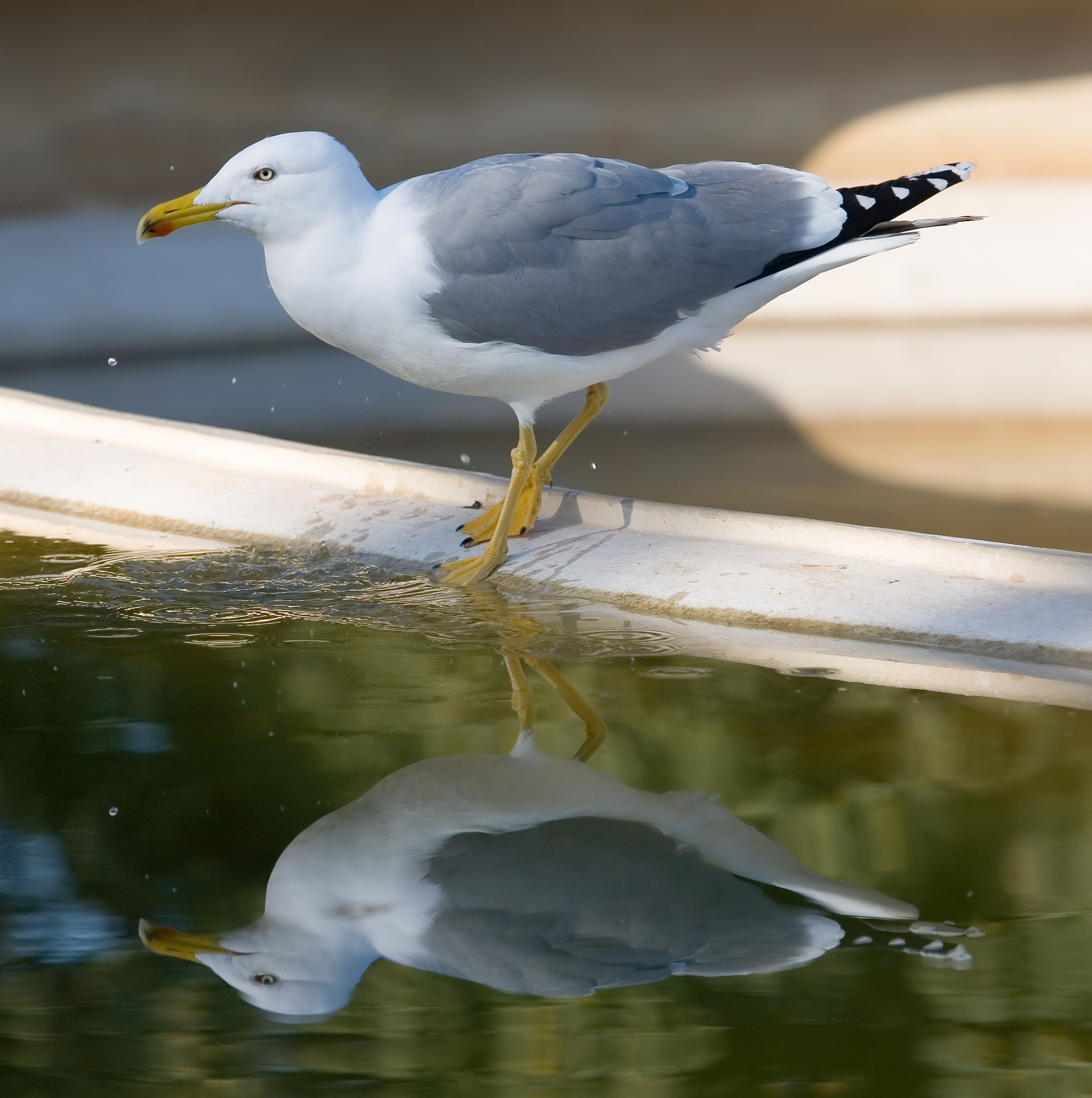
Lesser black-backed gull

Laridae is a family of medium to large seabirds, the gulls, terns, and skimmers. Gulls are typically grey or white, often with black markings on the head or wings. They have stout, longish bills and webbed feet. Terns are a group of generally medium to large seabirds typically with grey or white plumage, often with black markings on the head. Most terns hunt fish by diving but some pick insects off the surface of fresh water. Terns are generally long-lived birds, with several species known to live in excess of 30 years. Skimmers are a small family of tropical tern-like birds. They have an elongated lower mandible which they use to feed by flying low over the water surface and skimming the water for small fish.

Common name	Binomial	Comments
Brown noddy	Anous stolidus	
Black noddy	Anous minutus	(A)
Lesser black-backed gull	Larus fuscus	(A)
Gull-billed tern	Gelochelidon nilotica	
Greater crested tern	Thalasseus bergii	
Lesser crested tern	Thalasseus bengalensis	
Little tern	Sternula albifrons	
Bridled tern	Onychoprion anaethetus	
Sooty tern	Onychoprion fuscatus	
Common tern	Sterna hirundo	
White-cheeked tern	Sterna repressa	
Whiskered tern	Chlidonias hybrida	
Saunders's tern	Sternula saundersi	
Caspian tern	Hydroprogne caspia	

== Tropicbirds ==
Order: Phaethontiformes Family: Phaethontidae

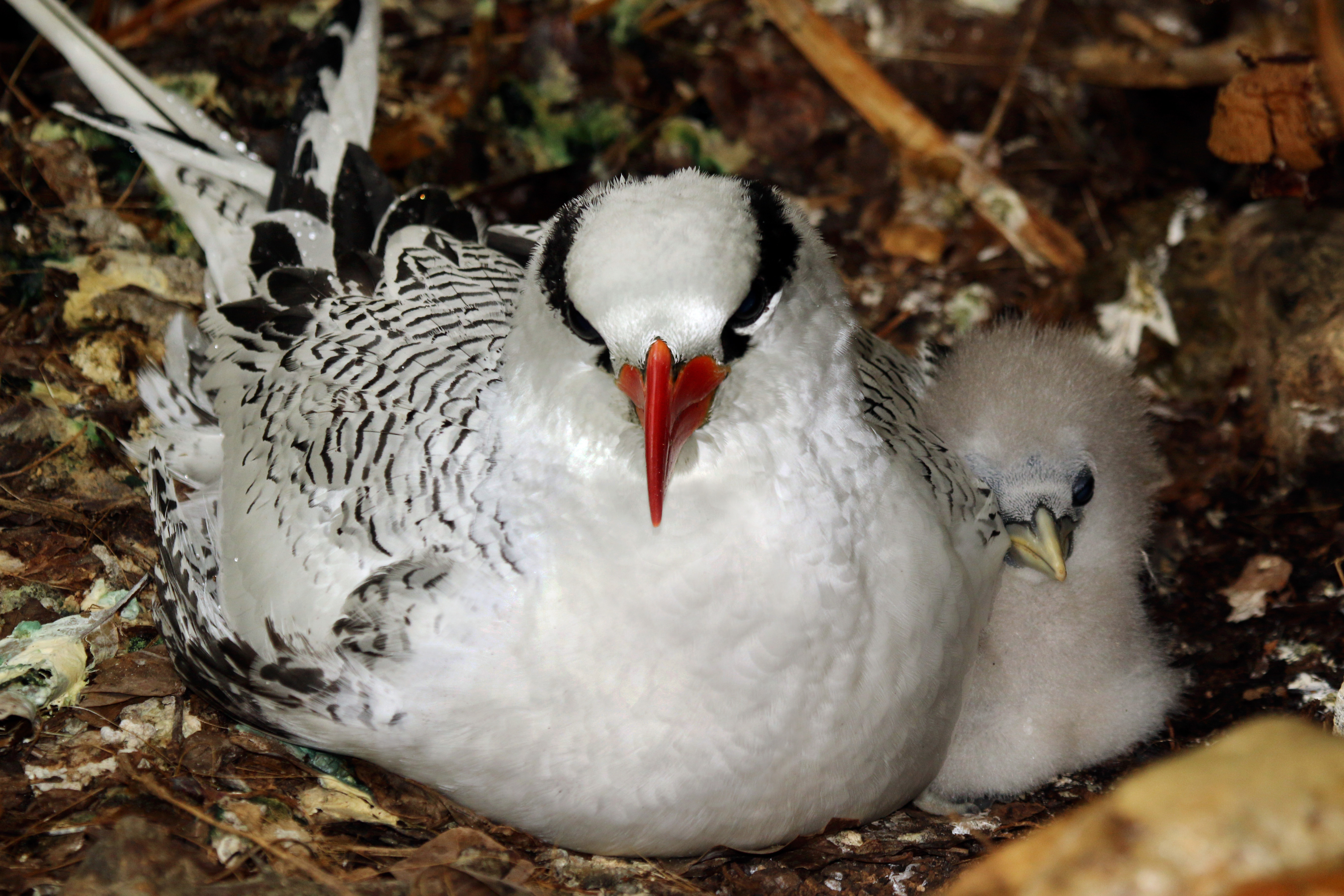
Red-billed tropicbird

Tropicbirds are slender white birds of tropical oceans, with exceptionally long central tail feathers. Their heads and long wings have black markings.

Common name	Binomial	Comments
Red-billed tropicbird	Phaethon aethereus	
White-tailed tropicbird	Phaethon lepturus	

== Austral storm petrels ==
Order: Procellariiformes Family: Oceanitidae

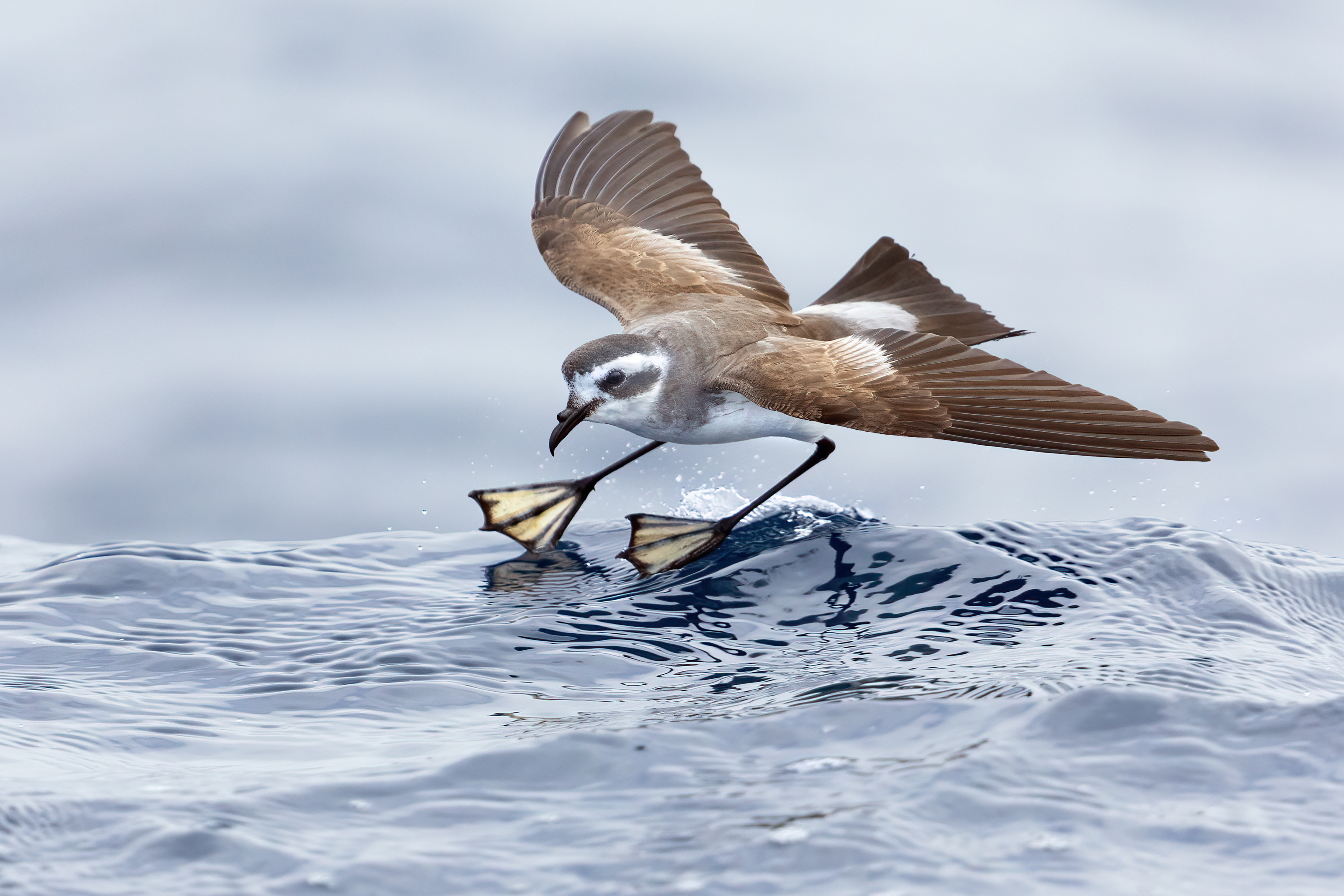
White-faced storm petrel

The storm petrels are relatives of the petrels and are the smallest seabirds. They feed on planktonic crustaceans and small fish picked from the surface, typically while hovering. The flight is fluttering and sometimes bat-like.

Common name	Binomial	Comments
Wilson's storm petrel	Oceanites oceanicus	
White-faced storm petrel	Pelagodroma marina	(A)
Black-bellied storm petrel	Fregetta tropica	(A)

== Northern storm petrels ==
Order: Procellariiformes Family: Hydrobatidae

The northern storm petrels are relatives of the petrels and are the smallest seabirds. They feed on planktonic crustaceans and small fish picked from the surface, typically while hovering. The flight is fluttering and sometimes bat-like.

Common name	Binomial	Comments
Swinhoe's storm petrel	Hydrobates monorhis	Near-threatened

== Petrels, shearwaters and diving petrels ==
Order: Procellariiformes Family: Procellariidae

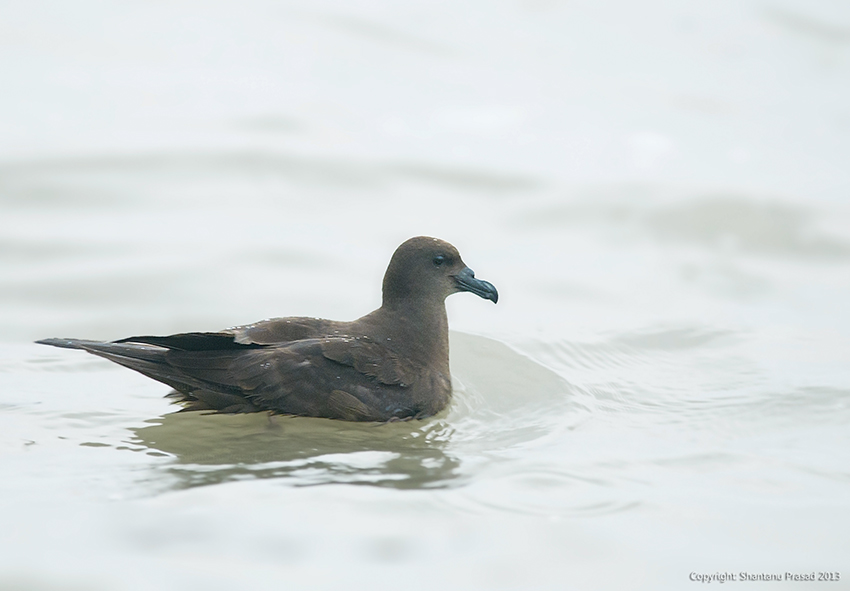
Jouanin's petrel

The procellariids are the main group of medium-sized "true petrels", characterised by united nostrils with medium septum and a long outer functional primary.

Common name	Binomial	Comments
Barau's petrel	Pterodroma baraui	Endangered
Flesh-footed shearwater	Ardenna carneipes	Near-threatened
Jouanin's petrel	Bulweria fallax	Near-threatened

== Frigatebirds ==
Order: Suliformes Family: Fregatidae

Frigatebirds are large seabirds usually found over tropical oceans. They are large, black-and-white or completely black, with long wings and deeply forked tails. The males have coloured inflatable throat pouches. They do not swim or walk and cannot take off from a flat surface. Having the largest wingspan-to-body-weight ratio of any bird, they are essentially aerial, able to stay aloft for more than a week.

Common name	Binomial	Comments
Lesser frigatebird	Fregata ariel	(A)

== Gannets and boobies ==
Order: Suliformes Family: Sulidae

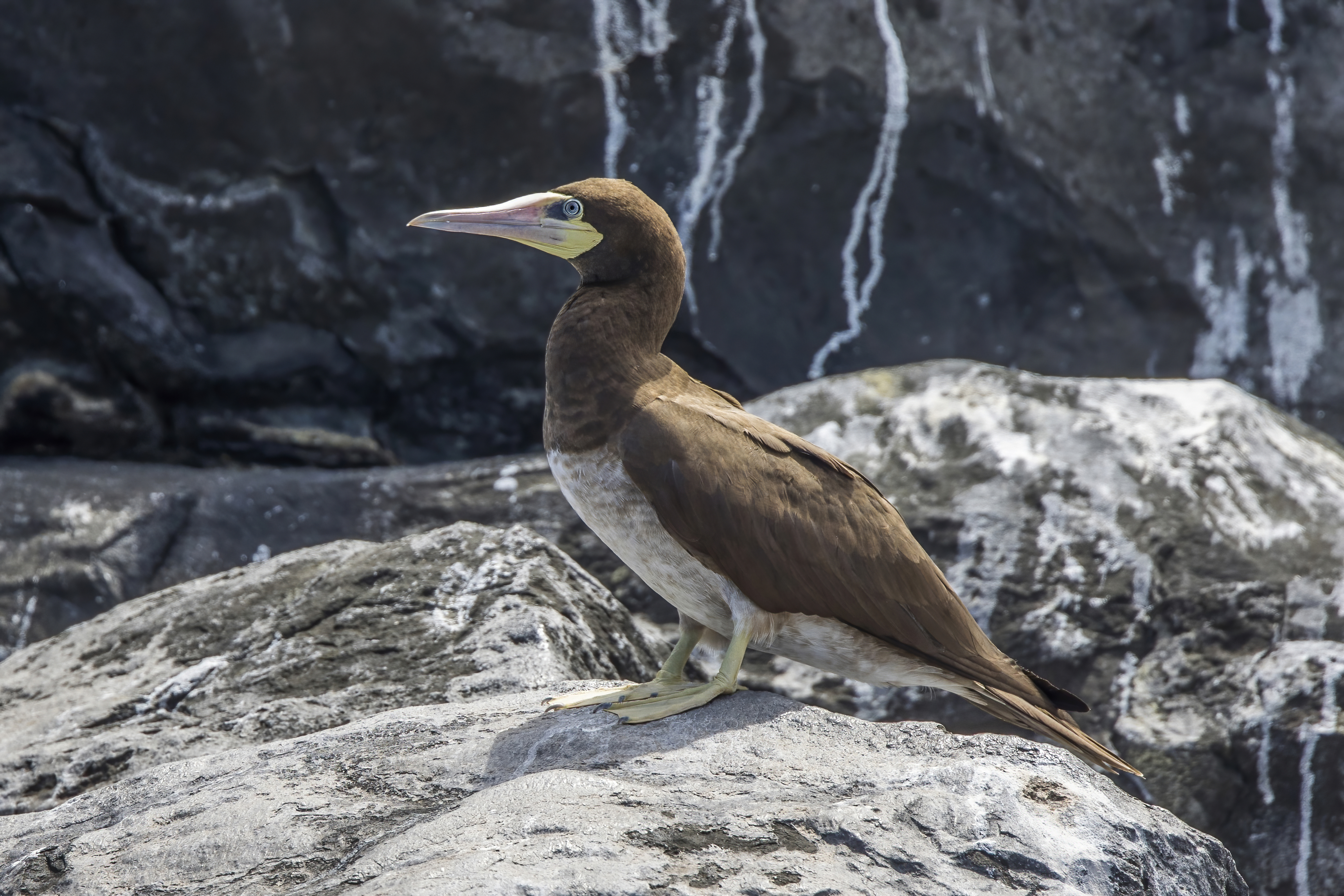
Brown booby

The sulids comprise the gannets and boobies. Both groups are medium to large coastal seabirds that plunge-dive for fish.

Common name	Binomial	Comments
Masked booby	Sula dactylatra	
Brown booby	Sula leucogaster	

== Cormorants and shags ==
Order: Suliformes Family: Phalacrocoracidae

Phalacrocoracidae is a family of medium to large coastal, fish-eating seabirds that includes cormorants and shags. Plumage colouration varies, with the majority having mainly dark plumage, some species being black-and-white and a few being colourful.

Common name	Binomial	Comments
Great cormorant	Phalacrocorax carbo	

== Ibises and spoonbills ==
Order: Pelecaniformes Family: Threskiornithidae

Threskiornithidae is a family of large terrestrial and wading birds which includes the ibises and spoonbills. They have long, broad wings with 11 primary and about 20 secondary feathers. They are strong fliers and despite their size and weight, very capable soarers.

Common name	Binomial	Comments
Glossy ibis	Plegadis falcinellus	

== Herons and bitterns ==
Order: Pelecaniformes Family: Ardeidae

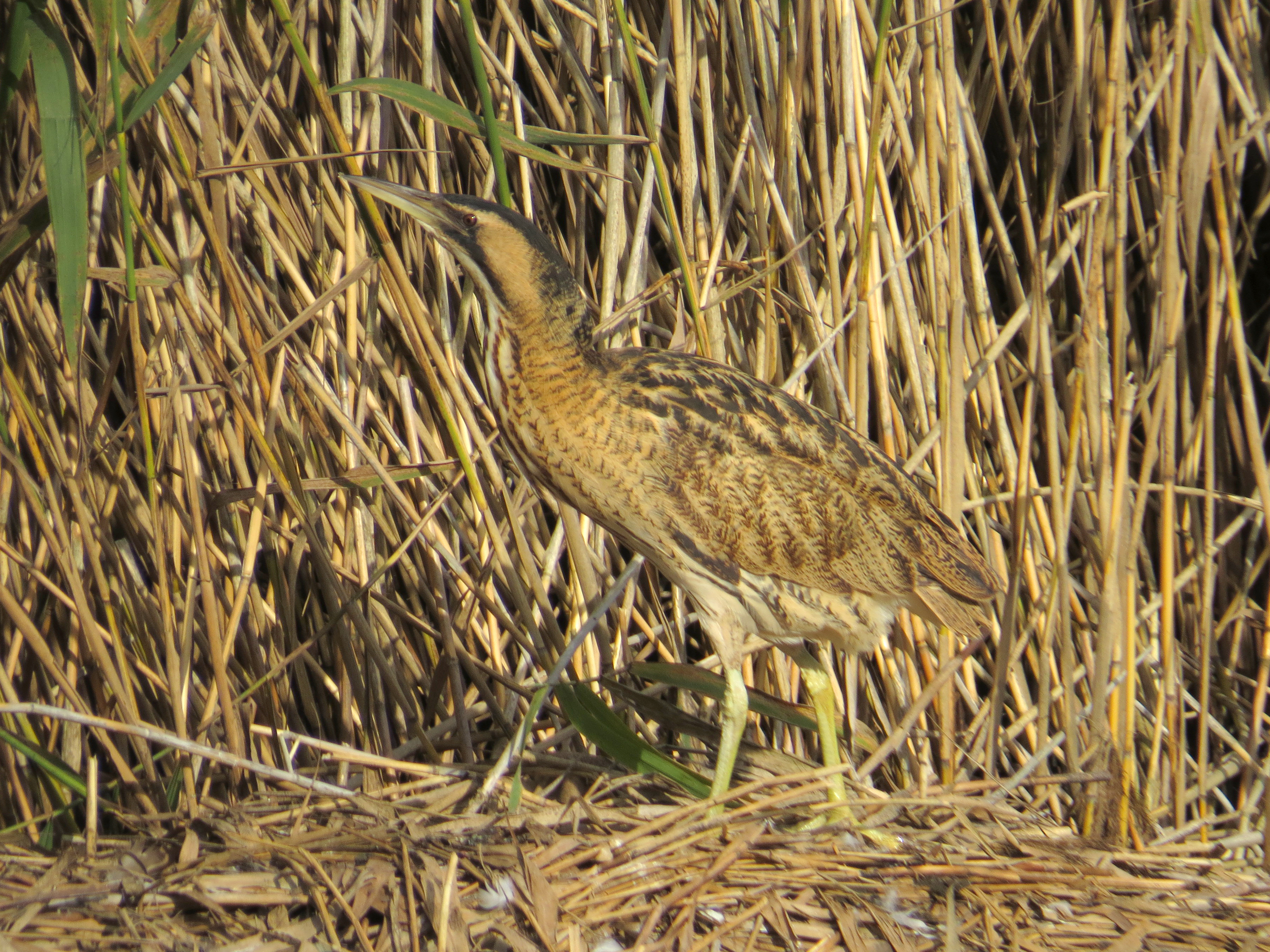
Eurasian bittern

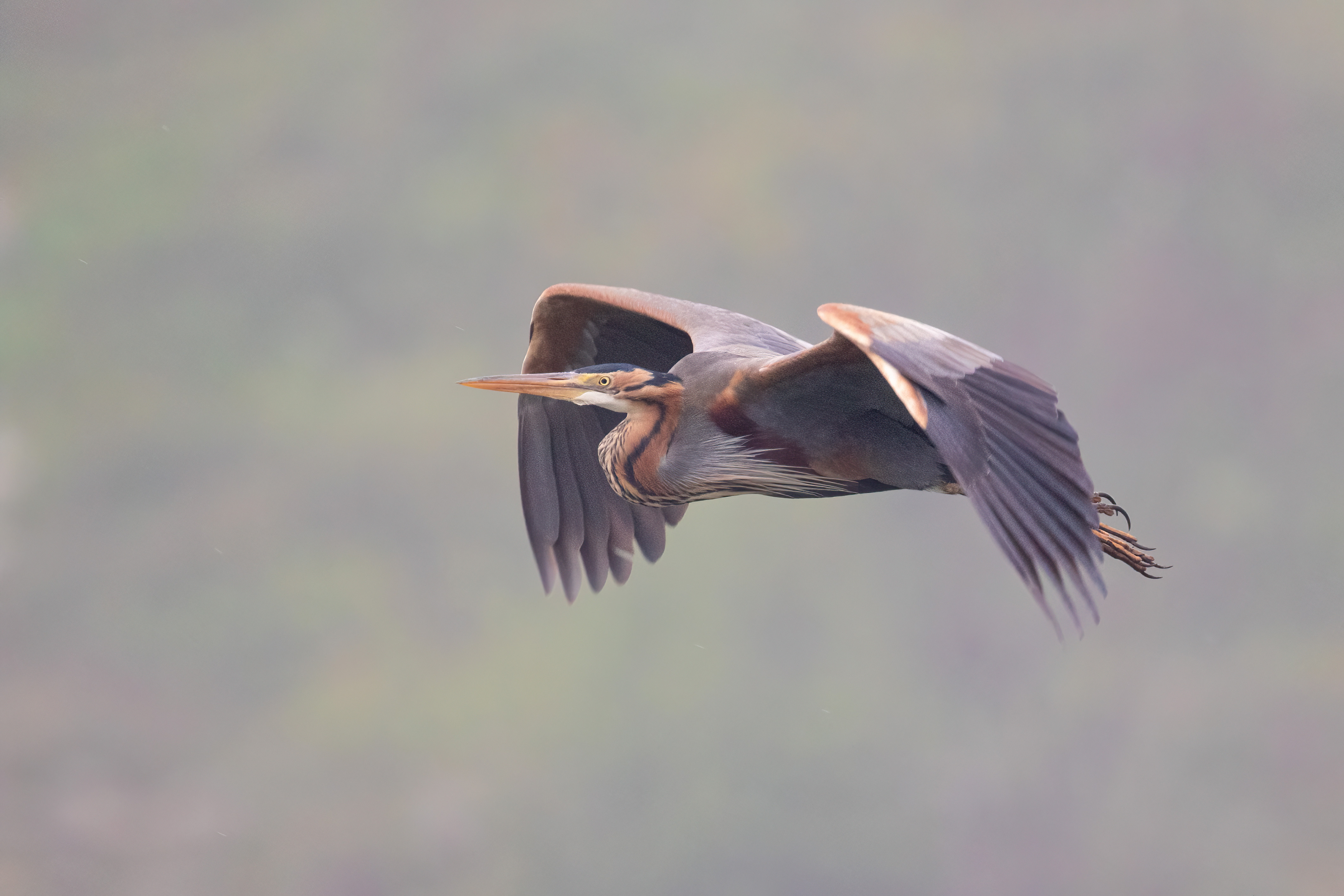
Purple heron

The family Ardeidae contains the bitterns, herons and egrets. Herons and egrets are medium to large wading birds with long necks and legs. Bitterns tend to be shorter necked and more wary. Members of Ardeidae fly with their necks retracted, unlike other long-necked birds such as storks, ibises and spoonbills.

Common name	Binomial	Comments
Eurasian bittern	Botaurus stellaris	(A)
Yellow bittern	Botaurus sinensis	
Cinnamon bittern	Botaurus cinnamomeus	
Black bittern	Botaurus flavicollis	
Black-crowned night heron	Nycticorax nycticorax	
Striated heron	Butorides striata	
Indian pond heron	Ardeola grayii	
Eastern cattle egret	Ardea coromandus	
Grey heron	Ardea cinerea	
Purple heron	Ardea purpurea	
Great egret	Ardea alba	
Medium egret	Ardea intermedia	
Little egret	Egretta garzetta	
Western reef heron	Egretta gularis	

== Osprey ==
Order: Accipitriformes Family: Pandionidae

The family Pandionidae contains usually only one species, the osprey. The osprey is a medium-large raptor which is a specialist fish-eater with most taxonomic authorities consider a worldwide distribution.

Common name	Binomial	Comments
Osprey	Pandion haliaetus	

== Hawks, eagles and kites ==
Order: Accipitriformes Family: Accipitridae

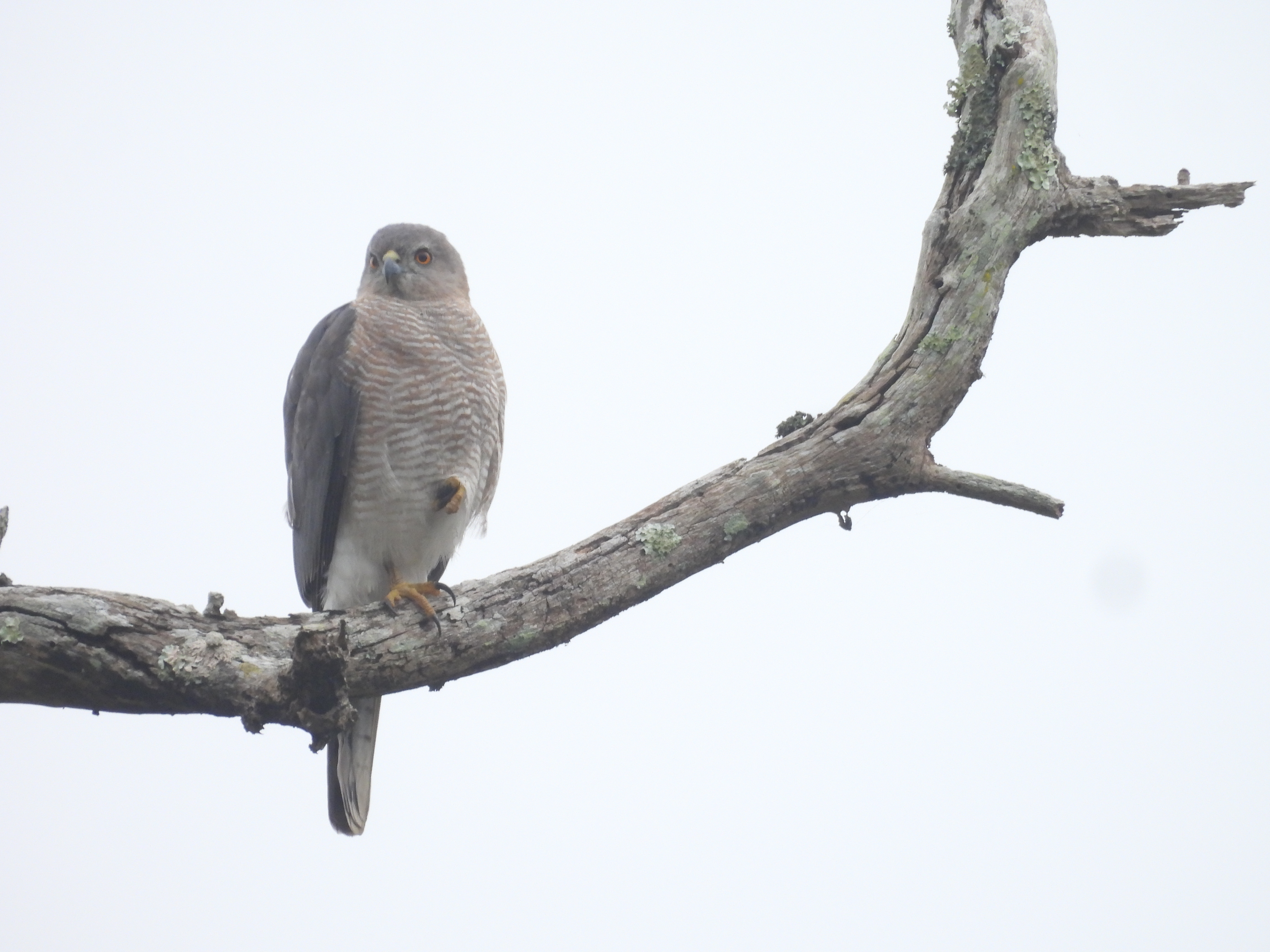
Shikra

Accipitridae is a family of birds of prey, which includes hawks, eagles, kites, harriers and Old World vultures. These birds have powerful hooked beaks for tearing flesh from their prey, strong legs, powerful talons and keen eyesight.

Common name	Binomial	Comments
Black-winged kite	Elanus caeruleus	
Crested honey buzzard	Pernis ptilorhynchus	
Shikra	Tachyspiza badia	
Black kite	Milvus migrans	
Brahminy kite	Haliastur indus	
White-bellied sea eagle	Icthyophaga leucogaster	

== Barn owls ==
Order: Strigiformes Family: Tytonidae

Barn owls are medium to large owls with large heads and characteristic heart-shaped faces. They have long strong legs with powerful talons.

Common name	Binomial	Comments
Eastern barn owl	Tyto javanica	

== Owls ==
Order: Strigiformes Family: Strigidae

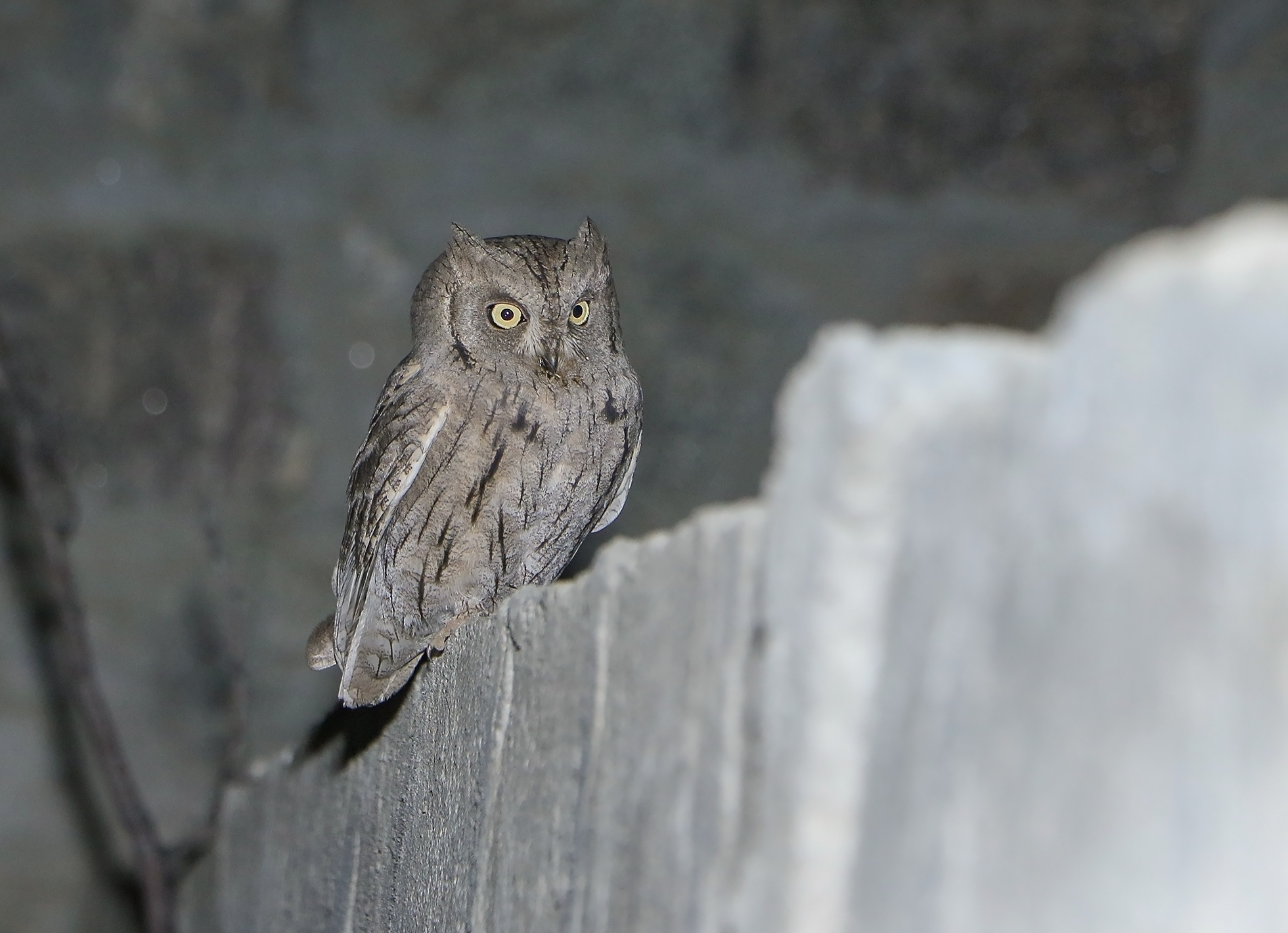
Pallid scops owl

The typical owls are small to large solitary nocturnal birds of prey. They have large forward-facing eyes and ears, a hawk-like beak and a conspicuous circle of feathers around each eye called a facial disk.

Common name	Binomial	Comments
Pallid scops owl	Otus brucei	(A)
Brown wood owl	Strix leptogrammica	Extirpated

== Hoopoes ==
Order: Bucerotiformes Family: Upupidae

Hoopoes have black, white and orangey-pink colouring with a large erectile crest on their head. There is one species which occurs in India.

Common name	Binomial	Comments
Eurasian hoopoe	Upupa epops	

== Bee-eaters ==
Order: Coraciiformes Family: Meropidae

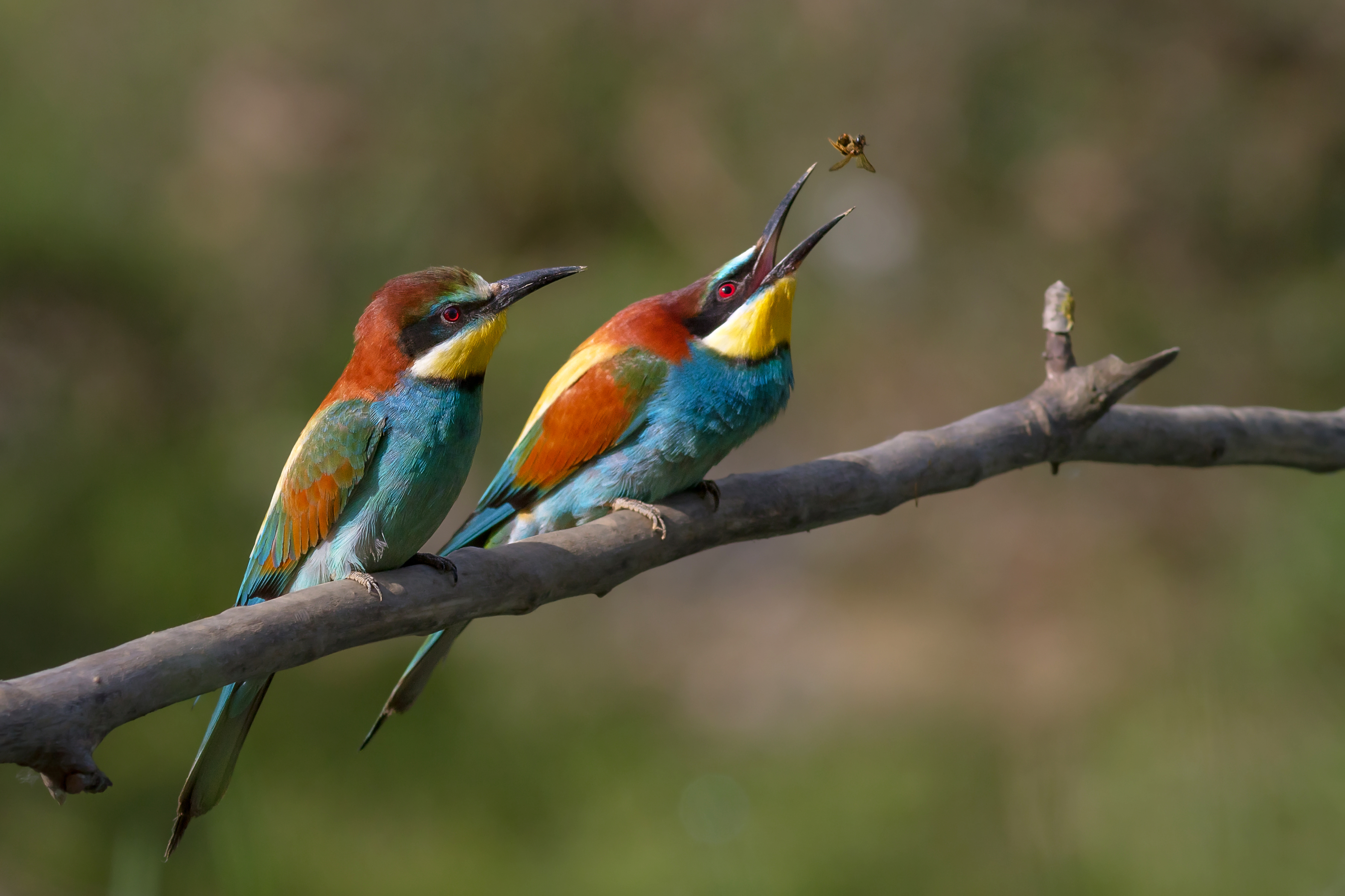
European bee-eater

The bee-eaters are a group of near passerine birds in the family Meropidae. Most species are found in Africa but others occur in southern Europe, Madagascar, Australia and New Guinea. They are characterised by richly coloured plumage, slender bodies and usually elongated central tail feathers. All are colorful and have long downturned bills and pointed wings, which give them a swallow-like appearance when seen from afar.

Common name	Binomial	Comments
Blue-cheeked bee-eater	Merops persicus	
European bee-eater	Merops apiaster	(A)

== Kingfishers ==
Order: Coraciiformes Family: Alcedinidae

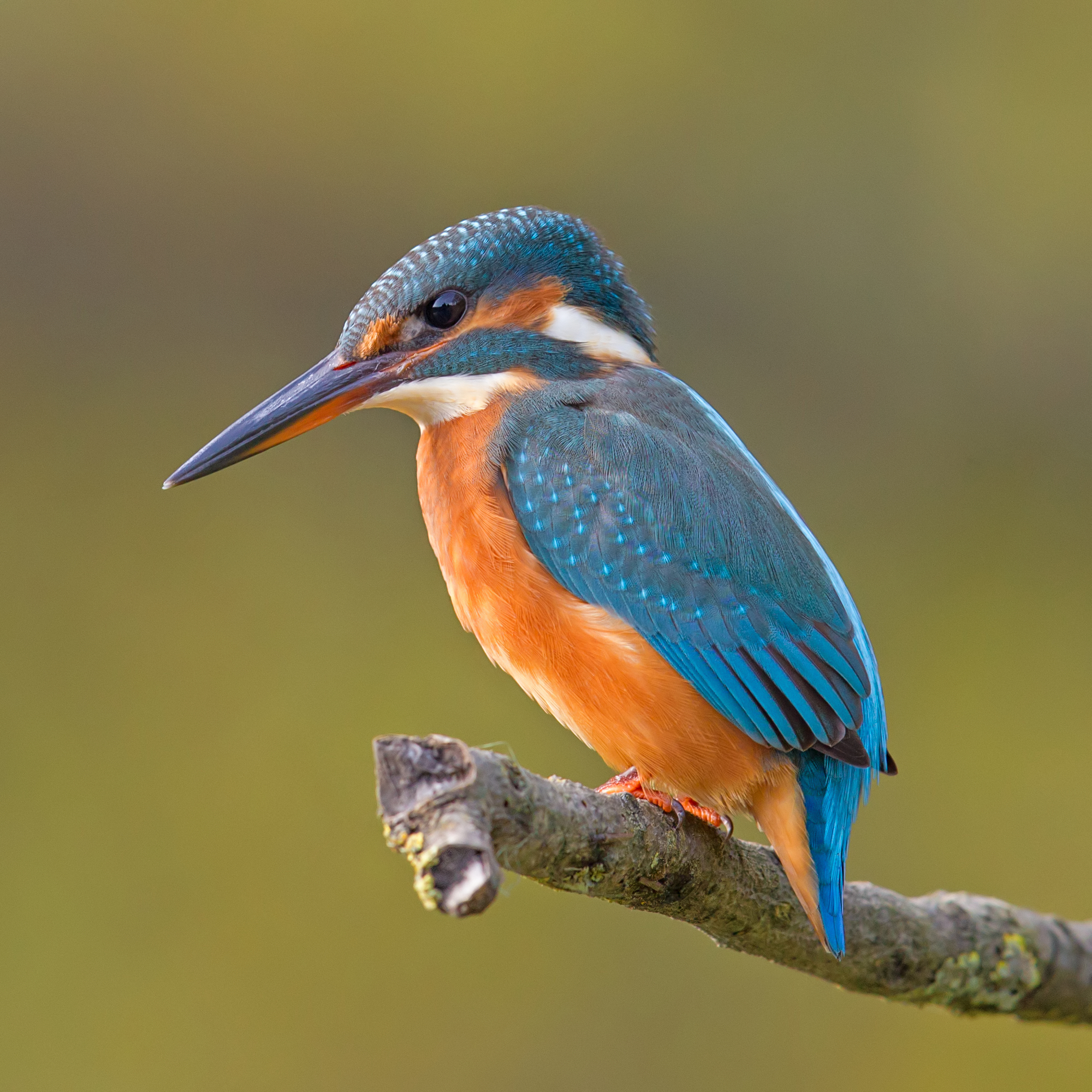
Common kingfisher

Kingfishers are medium-sized birds with large heads, long, pointed bills, short legs and stubby tails.

Common name	Binomial	Comments
Common kingfisher	Alcedo atthis	
White-throated kingfisher	Halcyon smyrnensis	

== Rollers ==
Order: Coraciiformes Family: Coraciidae

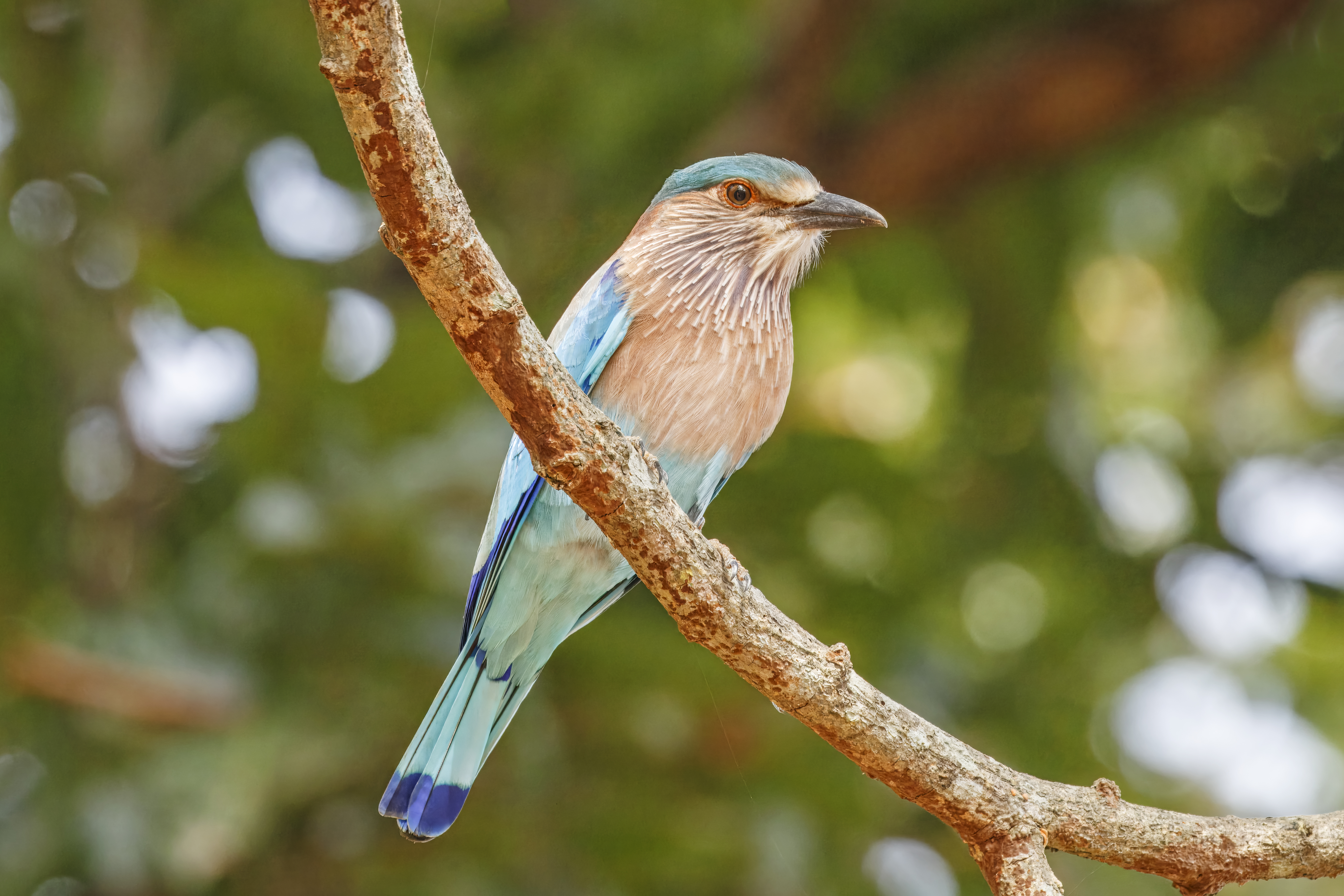
Indian roller

Rollers resemble crows in size and build, but are more closely related to the kingfishers and bee-eaters. They share the colourful appearance of those groups with blues and browns predominating. The two inner front toes are connected at the base, but the outer toe is not.

Common name	Binomial	Comments
Indian roller	Coracias benghalensis	
European roller	Coracias garrulus	

== Kestrels and falcons ==
Order: Falconiformes Family: Falconidae

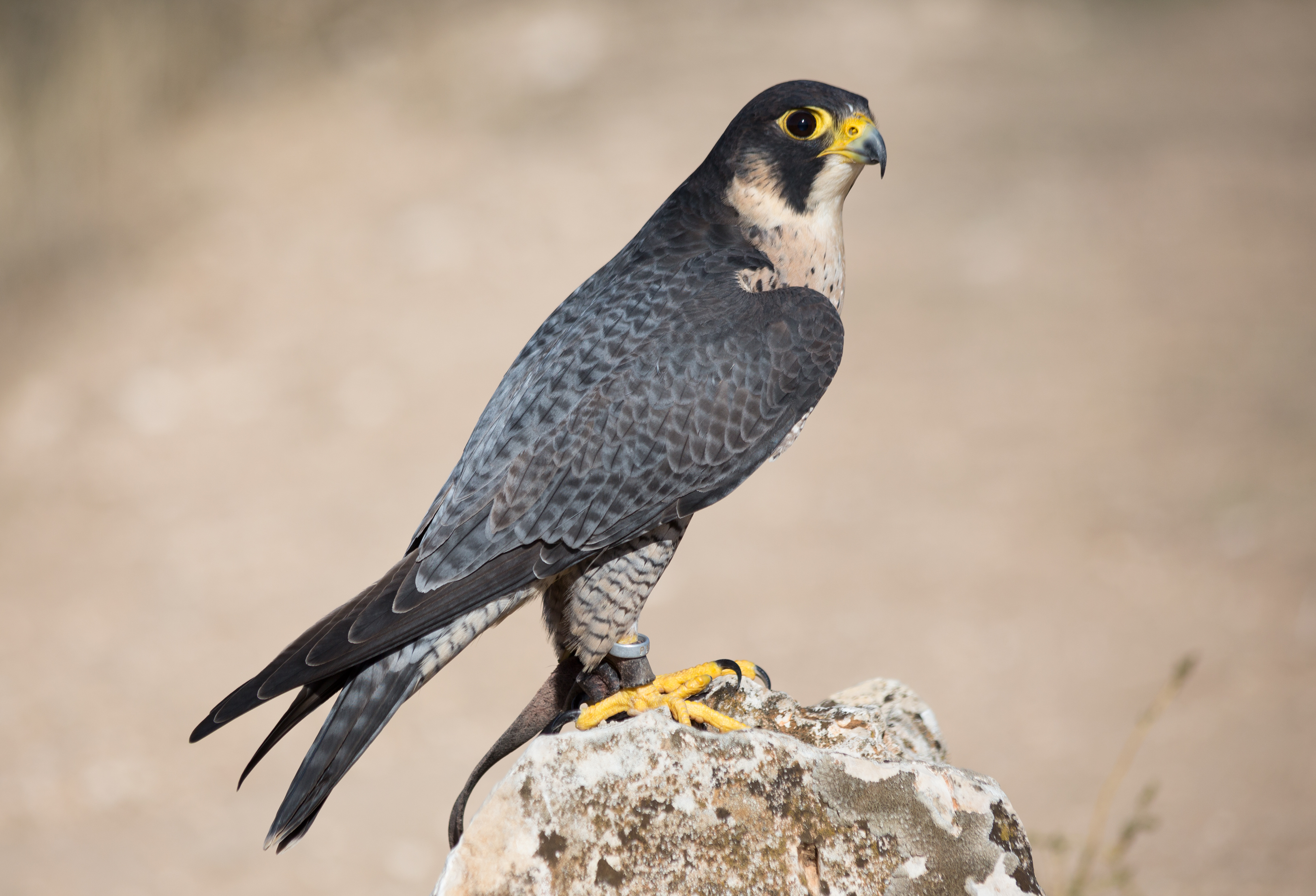
Peregrine falcon

Falconidae is a family of diurnal birds of prey. They differ from hawks, eagles and kites in that they kill with their beaks instead of their talons.

Common name	Binomial	Comments
Common kestrel	Falco tinnunculus	
Peregrine falcon	Falco peregrinus	

== Old World parakeets ==
Order: Psittaciformes Family: Psittaculidae

Characteristic features of parrots include a strong curved bill, an upright stance, strong legs, and clawed zygodactyl feet. Many parrots are vividly coloured, and some are multi-coloured. In size they range from 8 cm (3.1 in) to 1 m (3.3 ft) in length. Old World parrots are found from Africa east across south and southeast Asia and Oceania to Australia and New Zealand.

Common name	Binomial	Comments
Rose-ringed parakeet	Psittacula krameri	

== Pittas ==
Order: Passeriformes Family: Pittidae

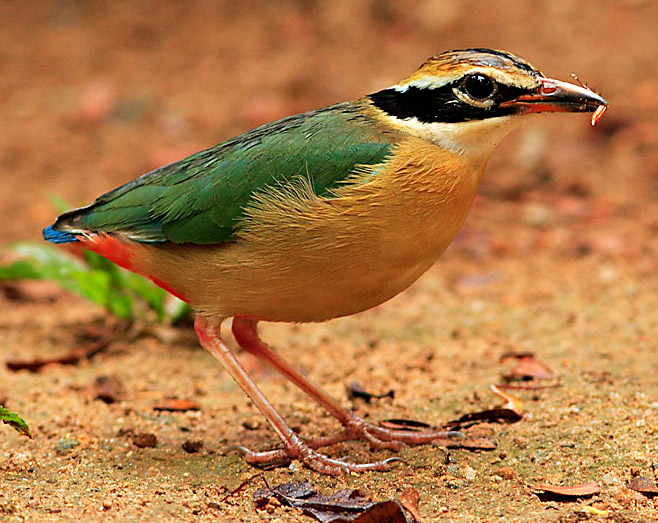
Indian pitta

Pittas are medium-sized by passerine standards and are stocky, with fairly long, strong legs, short tails and stout bills. Many are brightly coloured. They spend the majority of their time on wet forest floors, eating snails, insects and similar invertebrates.

Common name	Binomial	Comments
Indian pitta	Pitta brachyura	(A)

== Orioles, figbirds and turnagra ==
Order: Passeriformes Family: Oriolidae

The Old World orioles are colourful passerine birds. They are not related to the New World orioles.

Common name	Binomial	Comments
Indian golden oriole	Oriolus kundoo	

== Drongos ==
Order: Passeriformes Family: Dicruridae

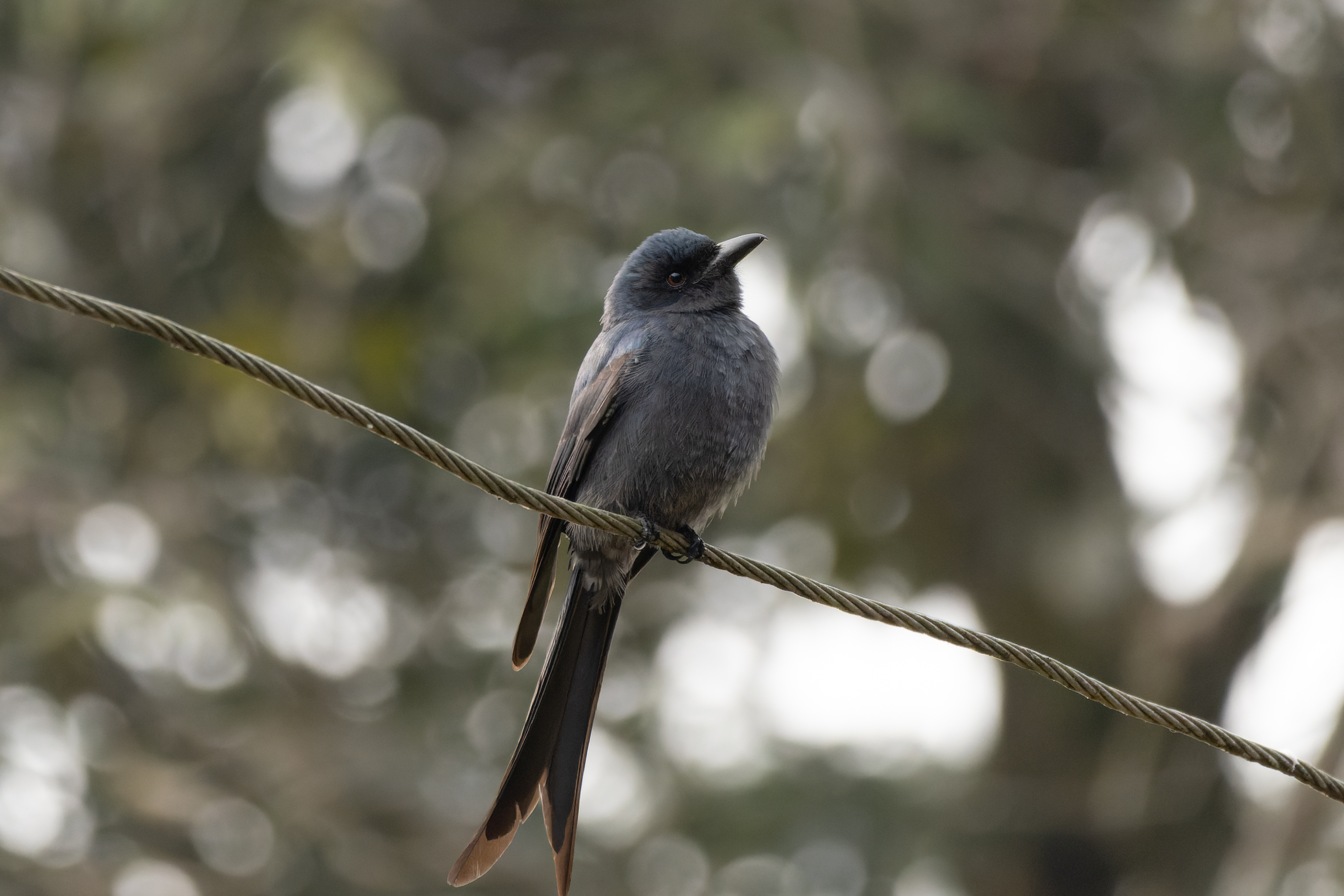
Ashy drongo

The drongos are mostly black or dark grey in colour, sometimes with metallic tints. They have long forked tails, and some Asian species have elaborate tail decorations. They have short legs and sit very upright when perched, like a shrike. They flycatch or take prey from the ground.

Common name	Binomial	Comments
Ashy drongo	Dicrurus leucophaeus	

== Shrikes ==
Order: Passeriformes Family: Laniidae

Shrikes are passerine birds known for their habit of catching other birds and small animals and impaling the uneaten portions of their bodies on thorns. A typical shrike's beak is hooked, like a bird of prey.

Common name	Binomial	Comments
Brown shrike	Lanius cristatus	

== Crows and ravens ==
Order: Passeriformes Family: Corvidae

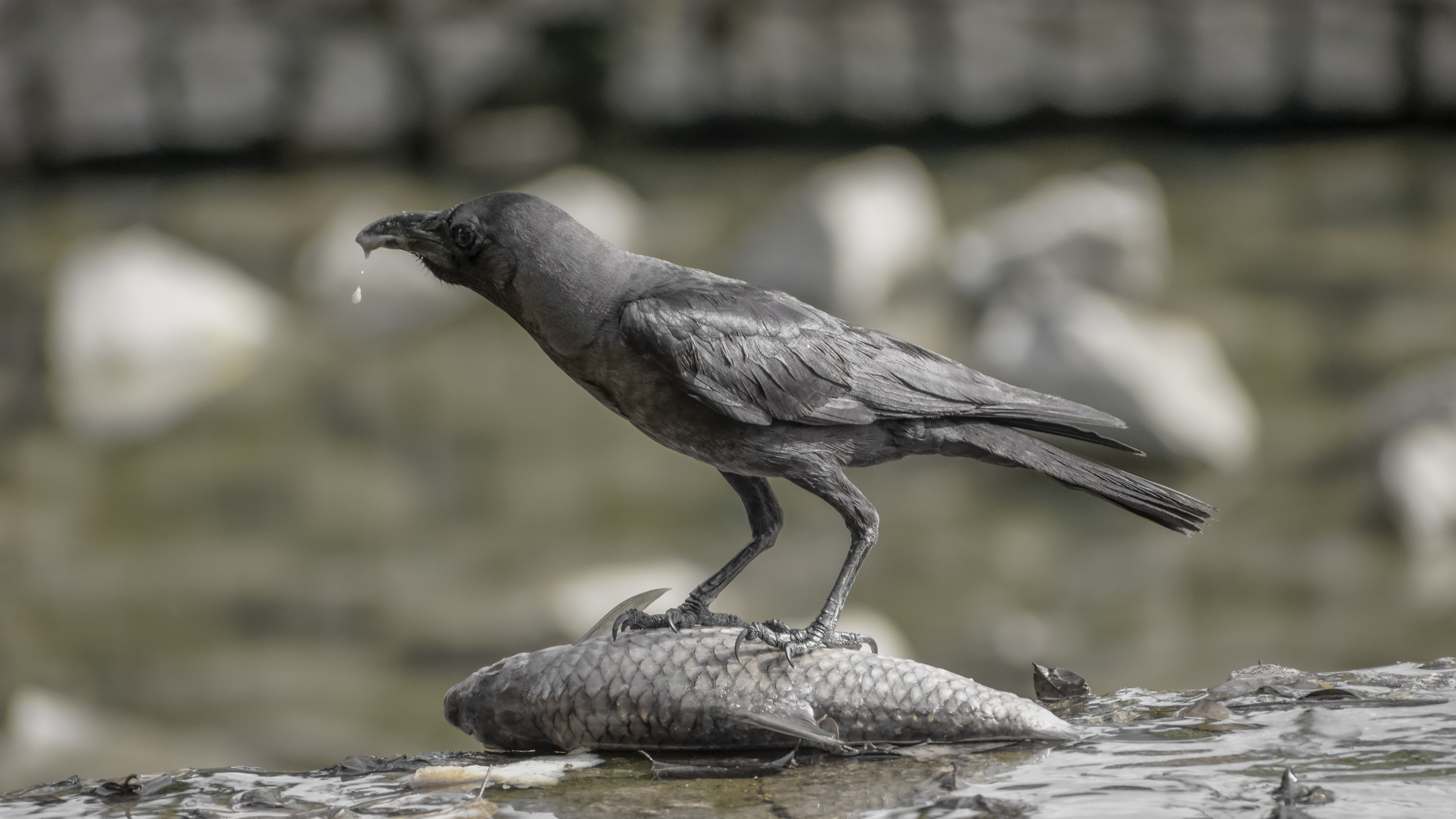
House crow

The family Corvidae includes crows, ravens, jays, choughs, magpies, treepies, nutcrackers and ground jays. Corvids are above average in size among the Passeriformes, and some of the larger species show high levels of intelligence.

Common name	Binomial	Comments
House crow	Corvus splendens	(I)

== Larks ==
Order: Passeriformes Family: Alaudidae

Larks are small terrestrial birds with often extravagant songs and display flights. Most larks are fairly dull in appearance. Their food is insects and seeds.

Common name	Binomial	Comments
Mongolian short-toed lark	Calandrella dukhunensis	(A)

== Reed warblers and allies ==
Order: Passeriformes Family: Acrocephalidae

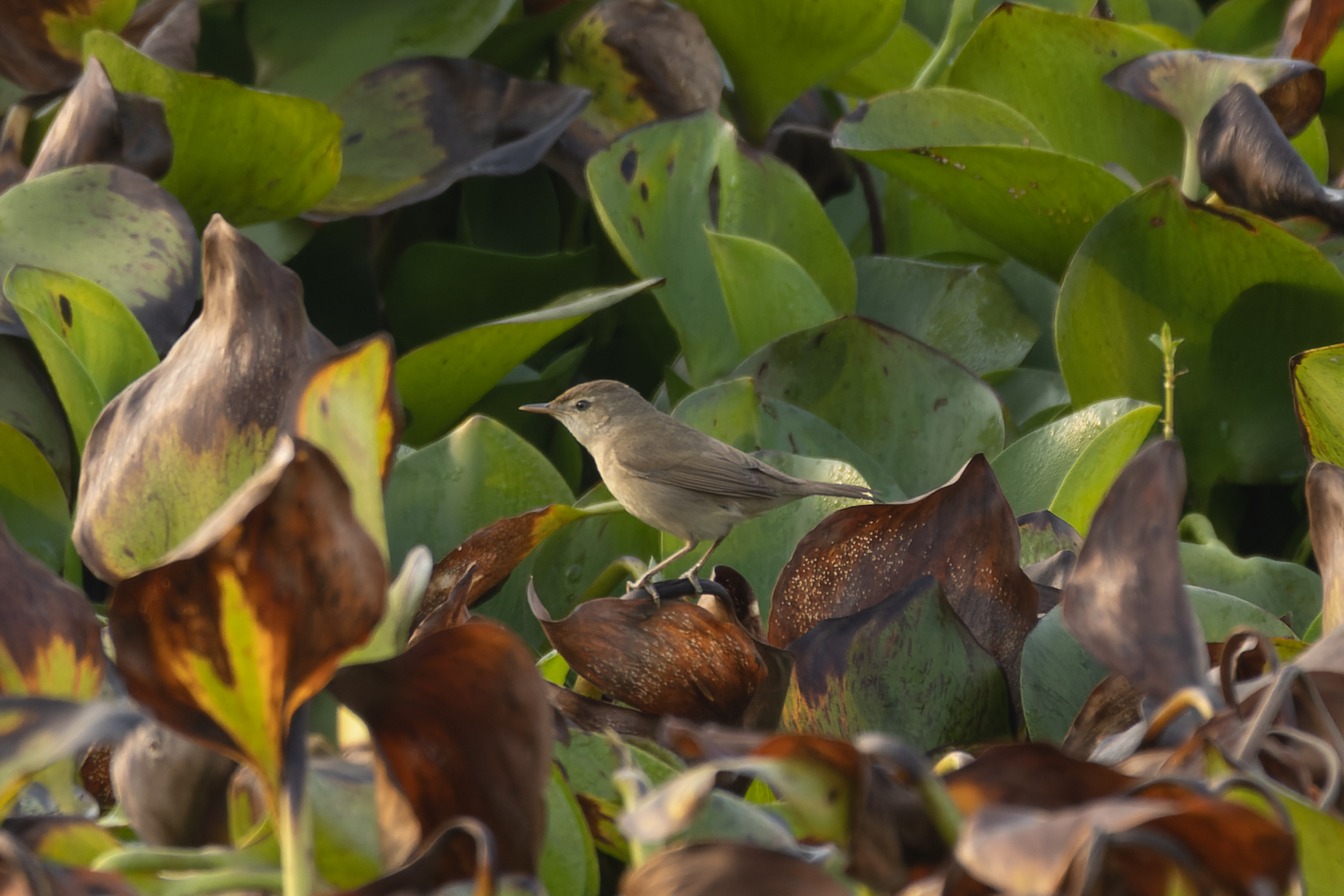
Blyth's reed warbler

The members of this family are usually rather large for "warblers". Most are rather plain olivaceous brown above with much yellow to beige below. They are usually found in open woodland, reedbeds, or tall grass. The family occurs mostly in southern to western Eurasia and surroundings, but it also ranges far into the Pacific, with some species in Africa.

Common name	Binomial	Comments
Blyth's reed warbler	Acrocephalus dumetorum	(A)

== Swallows and martins ==
Order: Passeriformes Family: Hirundinidae

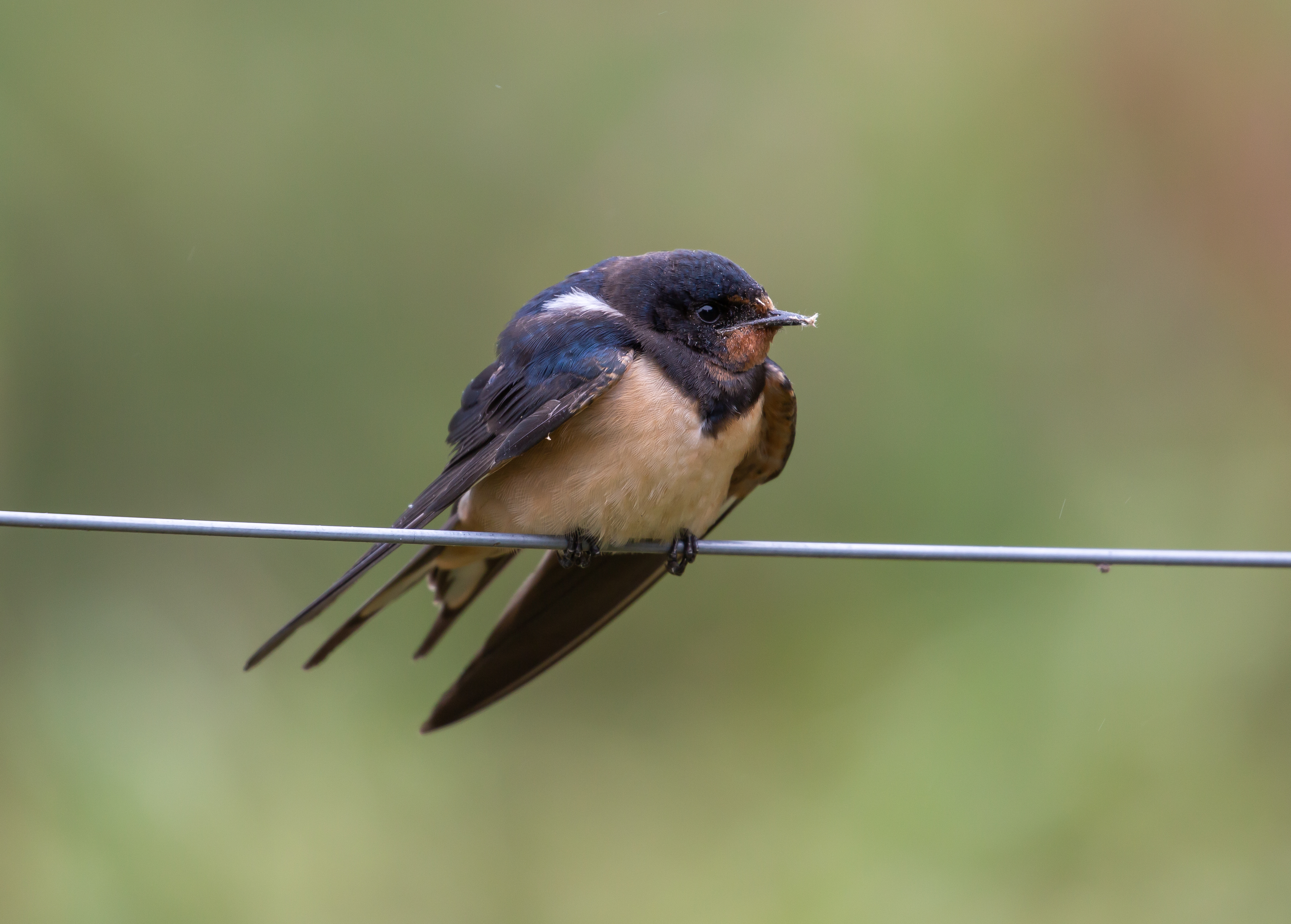
Barn swallow

The family Hirundinidae is adapted to aerial feeding. They have a slender streamlined body, long pointed wings and a short bill with a wide gape. The feet are adapted to perching rather than walking, and the front toes are partially joined at the base.

Common name	Binomial	Comments
Barn swallow	Hirundo rustica	
Sand martin	Riparia riparia	

== Leaf warblers and allies ==
Order: Passeriformes Family: Phylloscopidae

Leaf warblers are a family of small insectivorous birds found mostly in Eurasia and ranging into Wallacea and Africa. The species are of various sizes, often green-plumaged above and yellow below, or more subdued with grayish-green to grayish-brown colors.

Common name	Binomial	Comments
Greenish warbler	Phylloscopus trochiloides	
Common chiffchaff	Phylloscopus collybita	

== White-eyes ==
Order: Passeriformes Family: Zosteropidae

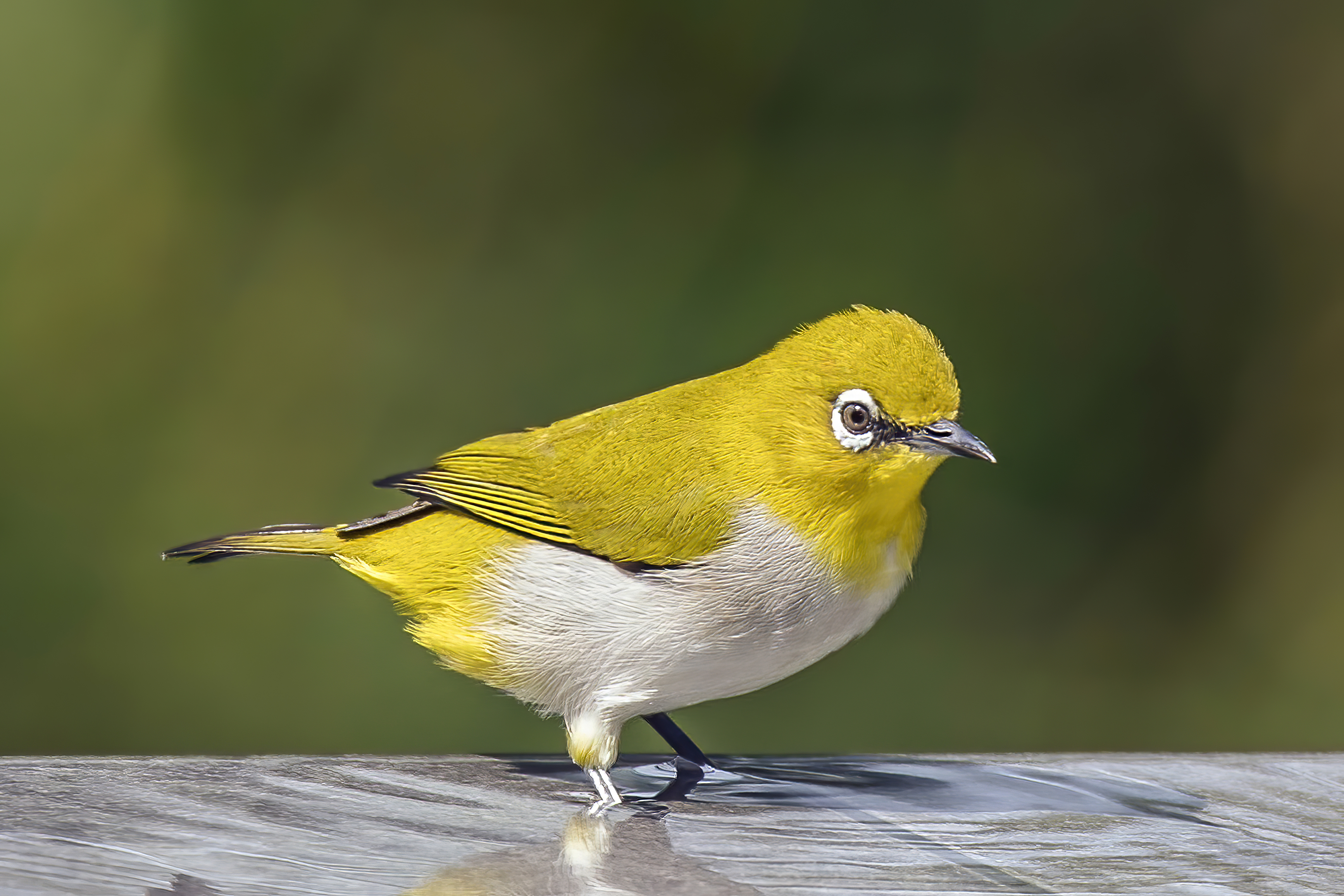
Indian white-eye

The white-eyes are small and mostly undistinguished, their plumage above being generally some dull colour like greenish-olive, but some species have a white or bright yellow throat, breast or lower parts, and several have buff flanks. As their name suggests, many species have a white ring around each eye.

Common name	Binomial	Comments
Indian white-eye	Zosterops palpebrosus	

== Starlings and rhabdornis ==
Order: Passeriformes Family: Sturnidae

Starlings are small to medium-sized passerine birds. Their flight is strong and direct and they are very gregarious. Their preferred habitat is fairly open country. They eat insects and fruit. Plumage is typically dark with a metallic sheen.

Common name	Binomial	Comments
Rosy starling	Pastor roseus	

== Old world flycatchers ==
Order: Passeriformes Family: Muscicapidae

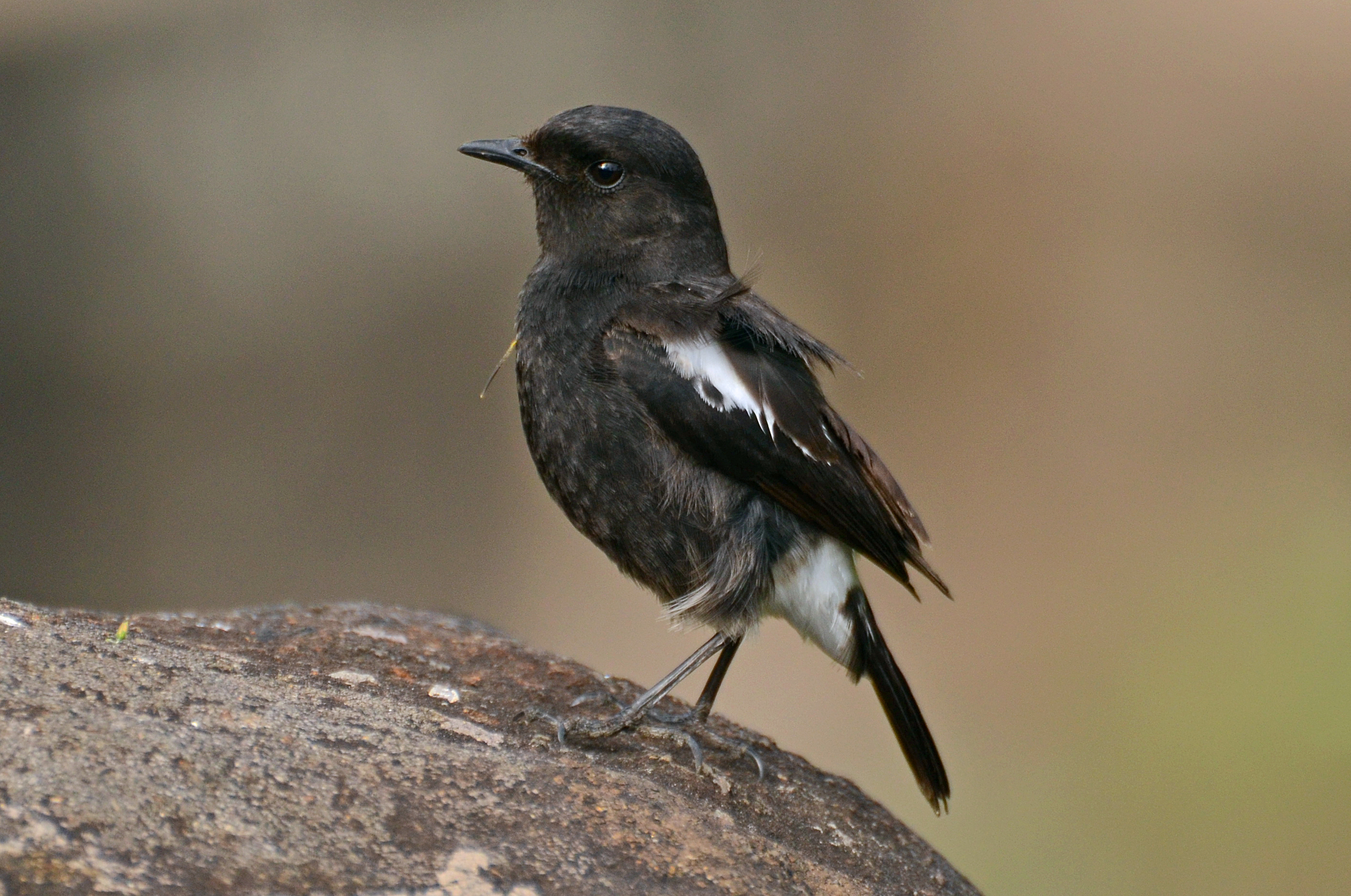
Pied bushchat

Old World flycatchers are a large group of small passerine birds native to the Old World. They are mainly small arboreal insectivores. The appearance of these birds is highly varied, but they mostly have weak songs and harsh calls.

Common name	Binomial	Comments
Asian brown flycatcher	Muscicapa dauurica	
Spotted flycatcher	Muscicapa striata	
Pied bushchat	Saxicola caprata	

== Wagtails and pipits ==
Order: Passeriformes Family: Motacillidae

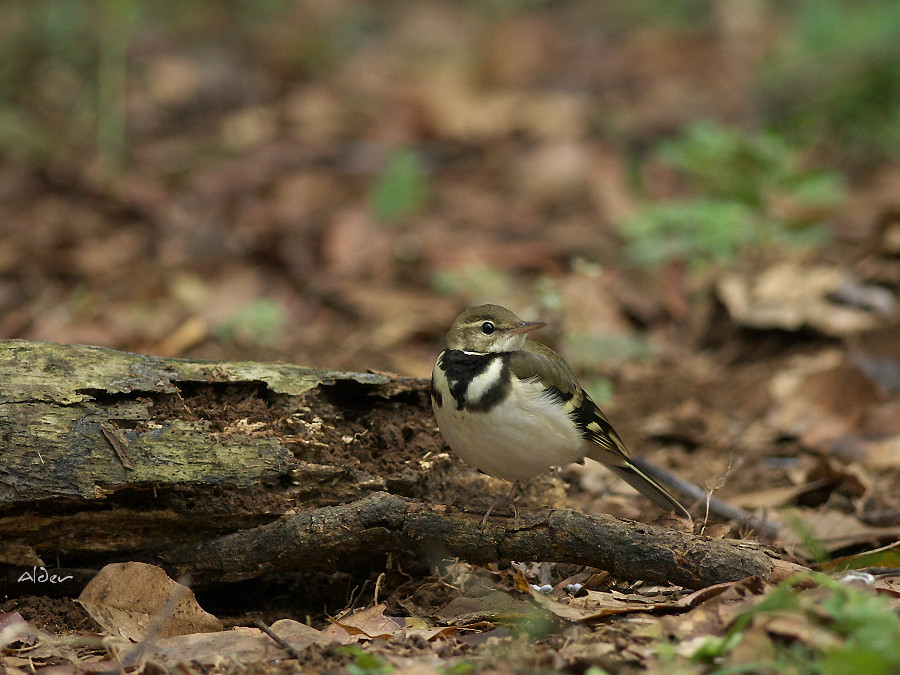
Forest wagtail

Motacillidae is a family of small passerine birds with medium to long tails. They include the wagtails, longclaws and pipits. They are slender, ground feeding insectivores of open country.

Common name	Binomial	Comments
Forest wagtail	Dendronanthus indicus	
Western yellow wagtail	Motacilla flava	
Grey wagtail	Motacilla cinerea	
White wagtail	Motacilla alba	(A)
Paddyfield pipit	Anthus rufulus	
Tree pipit	Anthus trivialis	
Red-throated pipit	Anthus cervinus	

== Finches and euphonias ==
Order: Passeriformes Family: Fringillidae

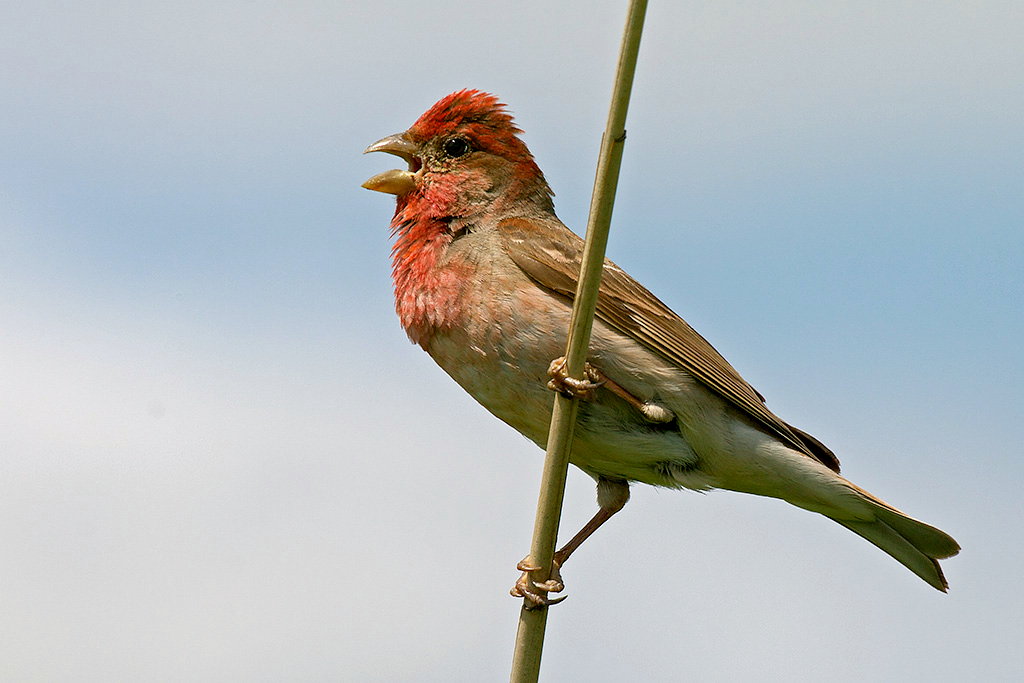
Common rosefinch

Finches are seed-eating passerine birds, that are small to moderately large and have a strong beak, usually conical and in some species very large. All have twelve tail feathers and nine primaries. These birds have a bouncing flight with alternating bouts of flapping and gliding on closed wings, and most sing well.

Common name	Binomial	Comments
Common rosefinch	Carpodacus erythrinus	

== Buntings ==
Order: Passeriformes Family: Emberizidae

The emberizids are a large family of passerine birds. They are seed-eating birds with distinctively shaped bills. Many emberizid species have distinctive head patterns.

Common name	Binomial	Comments
Black-headed bunting	Emberiza melanocephala	
