= Forêt du Tapcal =

Forest in Réunion

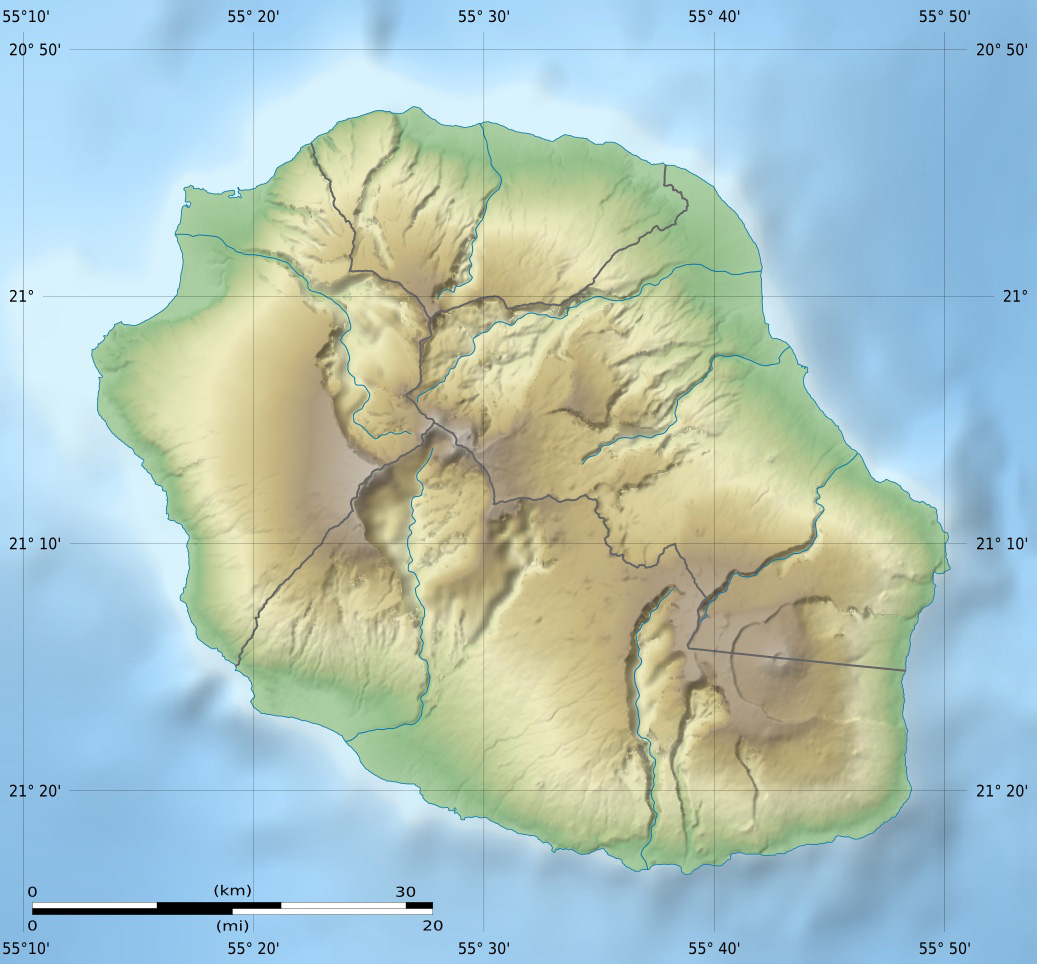
- Location within Réunion
- Interactive map of Forêt du Tapcal

Geography
- Location: La Réunion, La Réunion, France
- Coordinates: 21°08′26″S 55°25′20″E
- Elevation: 1,500 metres (4,900 ft)

Administration
- Authority: Réunion National Park

The forêt du Tapcal is a forest on the island of La Réunion, a French overseas department and outermost region of the European Union in the southwest Indian Ocean. It is situated in the cirque of Cilaos on the outskirts of the Grand Bénare, to the south of the summit. Recent expeditions have shown the presence of humans on the outskirts of the first. These are believed to be from maroons from the times of slavery.

== See also ==
- Grand Bénard – Tapcal Important Bird Area
