= Grand Bénard – Tapcal Important Bird Area =

Coordinates: 21°07′S 55°25′E

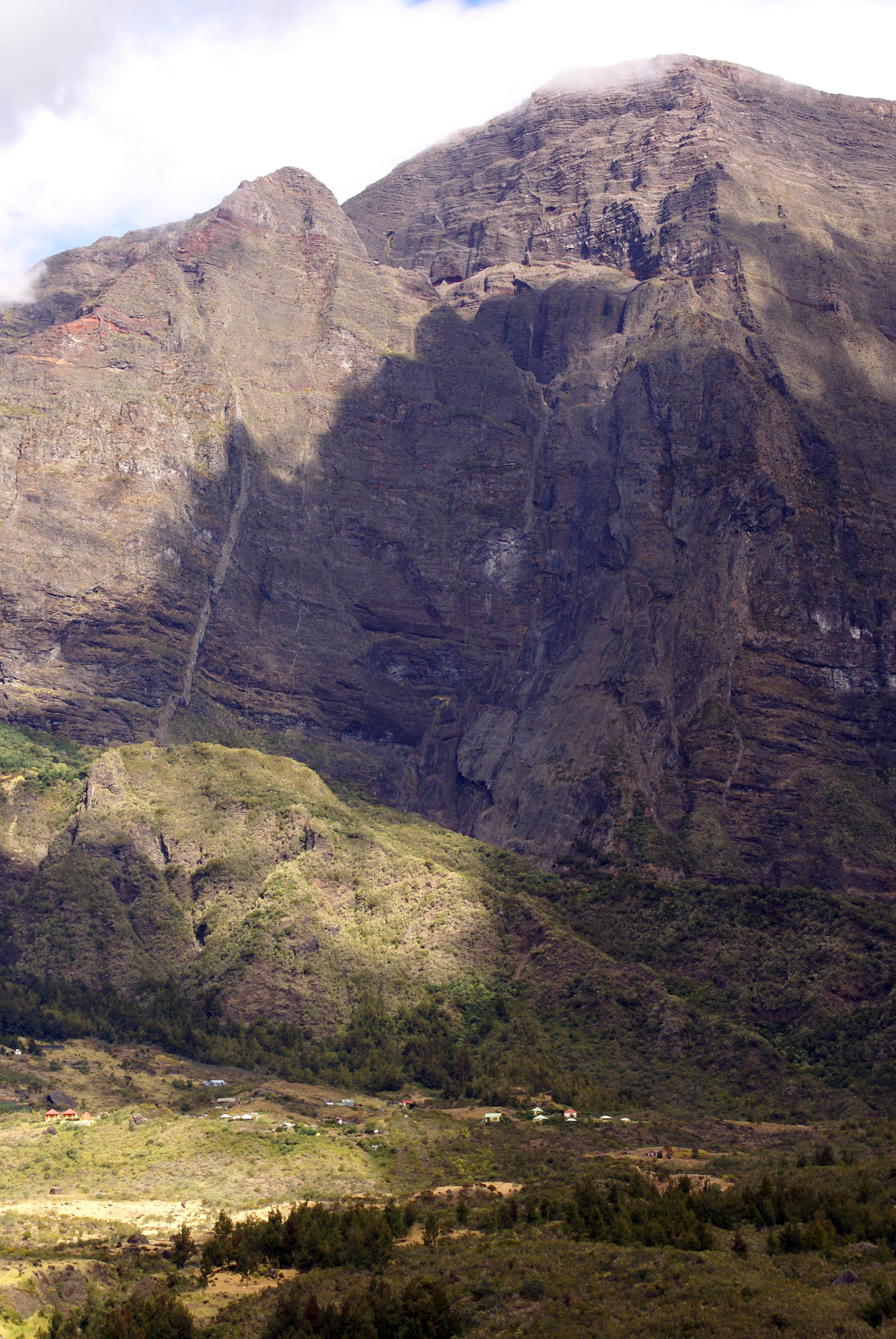
The peak and cliffs of Grand Bénard above the Mafate caldera

Grand Bénard – Tapcal Important Bird Area is a 1500 ha tract of land on the island of Réunion, a French territory in the western Indian Ocean.

== Description ==
It comprises the rugged terrain around the 2896 m peak of Grand Bénard on the Piton des Neiges volcanic massif, including parts of the caldera rims of Mafate and Cilaos, and the forest of Tapcal. The exposed ridges and peaks are mostly bare rock, while the more sheltered slopes are covered with shrubland. Tapcal contains native mixed mountain forest.

=== Birds ===
The site has been identified by BirdLife International as an Important Bird Area (IBA) because it supports breeding colonies of Barau's petrels (1000-1500 breeding pairs) and tropical shearwaters (300 pairs) as well as populations of Mascarene swiftlets, Mascarene paradise flycatchers, Réunion bulbuls, Mascarene white-eyes, Réunion olive white-eyes and Réunion stonechats.
