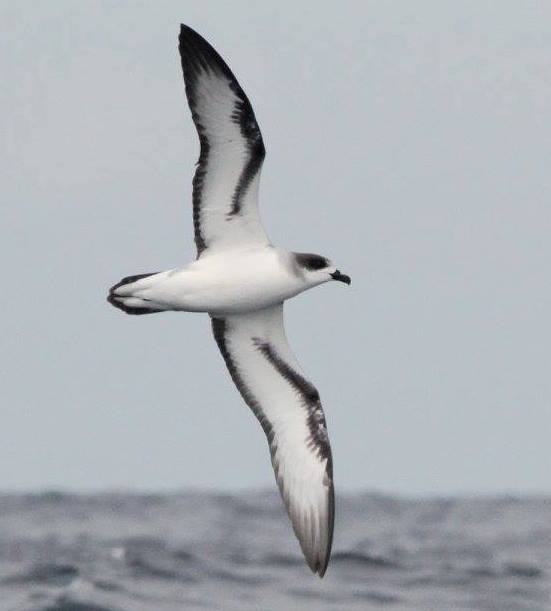

Conservation status
- Endangered (IUCN 3.1)

Scientific classification
- Kingdom: Animalia
- Phylum: Chordata
- Class: Aves
- Order: Procellariiformes
- Family: Procellariidae
- Genus: Pterodroma
- Species: P. baraui

Binomial name
- Pterodroma baraui (Jouanin, 1964)

= Barau's petrel =

Species of bird

Barau's petrel (Pterodroma baraui) is a medium-sized gadfly petrel from the family Procellariidae. Its main breeding site is the island of Réunion in the Indian Ocean.

== Etymology ==
The name commemorates Armand Barau, an agricultural engineer and ornithologist from the French territory of Réunion in the Indian Ocean. It is one of the most recently discovered species of seabird and was only described in 1964, although it was known to local people prior to that.

== Description ==
Barau's petrel is around 40 cm long, and has white undersides and forehead. Its bill is black and its upper parts are dark, with a moderately distinct "M" pattern across the wings and back.

== Distribution and habitat ==
Barau's petrel ranges across the Indian Ocean from Réunion to Western Australia and Indonesia. With the exception of a single nest found on the island of Rodrigues the bulk of the population is thought to nest on Réunion.

== Behaviour ==
=== Feeding ===
The petrels are highly pelagic at sea, preying on small fish (10 cm) by surface-seizing and plunge diving. They will associate with other species while feeding.

=== Breeding ===
Their colonies are unusual in being far inland and at high elevations; they dig burrows under the forest at around 2,400-2,700m above sea level. The breeding biology of the species has not been studied but it is inferred that they have a 55-day incubation period and take around 100–120 days to fledge a chick. Unlike most burrow nesting procellariids, Barau's petrels begin to return to their colonies diurnally, returning in the late afternoon and riding the thermal updrafts to conserve energy. The chicks fledge between November and February. Sites which have been identified by BirdLife International as being important for the conservation of the species include the Grand Bénard – Tapcal and Piton des Neiges – Gros Morne Important Bird Areas (IBAs) on Réunion where breeding colonies exist.

== Status and conservation ==
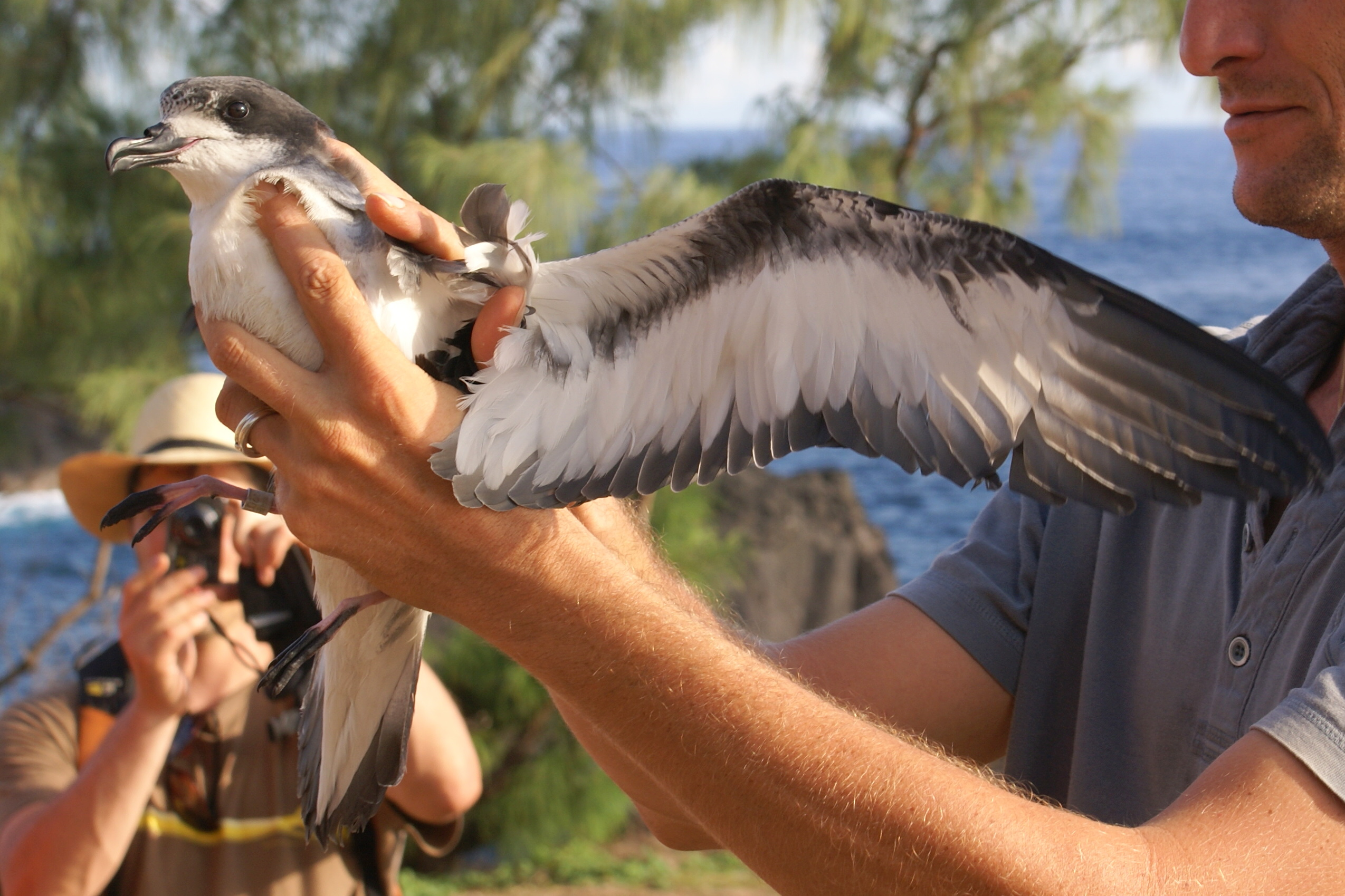
Release of a rescued fledgling

Barau's petrel is considered to be an endangered species. It has a highly restricted breeding range and has suffered hunting pressure in the past. While the shooting of the species has now been stopped, and the population seems to have recovered, it is currently threatened by introduced species (especially feral cats, who threaten both chicks and adults) and light pollution. Young birds, particularly fledglings, are disorientated by artificial lights such as streetlights or the floodlights of sporting venues, which they mistake for bioluminescent squid, and lead them to fail reach the sea. It is estimated that as much as 40% of each breeding season's fledglings get confused in this fashion. Conservation organisations work with local people to catch disorientated chicks and release them back at sea, a program that is thought to rescue most of the lost chicks. Measures are also underway to reduce light pollution by shielding light sources so that they don't attract young birds, a method that has been used to help Newell's shearwaters in Hawaii.
