= List of gadfly petrels =

This is a list of the birds that belong to the group gadfly petrels. They are all from the genus Pterodroma and belong to the family Procellariidae.

- Pterodroma macroptera, great-winged petrel, breeds and ranges on islands of the southern oceans
- Pterodroma gouldi, grey-faced petrel, breeds on islands off the coast of the North Island, New Zealand, and off the coast of southwestern Australia
- Pterodroma neglecta, Kermadec petrel, breeds on islands of the south Pacific from New Zealand to Easter Island, Juan Fernández Islands, San Ambrosio, and San Félix
  - Pterodroma neglecta neglecta breeds on south Pacific islands from New Zealand to Easter Island
  - Pterodroma neglecta juana breeds on Juan Fernández Islands, San Ambrosio, and San Félix
- Pterodroma magentae, magenta petrel, breeds on Chatham Islands
- Pterodroma arminjoniana, herald petrel breeds on Raine Island, Tonga, French Polynesia to Easter Island, Trindade Island and Martín Vaz
  - Pterodroma arminjoniana arminjoniana breeds on Trindade Island and Martín Vaz
  - Pterodroma arminjoniana heraldica breeds on Raine Island, Tonga, and French Polynesia to Easter Island
- Pterodroma ultima, Murphy's petrel breeds on Tuamotu Archipelago, Austral Islands and Pitcairn Island
- Pterodroma solandri, providence petrel breeds on Lord Howe Island and Philip Island; ranges to northwestern Pacific Ocean
- Pterodroma atrata, Henderson petrel breeds on Henderson Island
- Pterodroma madeira, Zino's petrel breeds on Madeira Island; ranges to east Atlantic Ocean
- Pterodroma feae, Fea's petrel breeds on the Cape Verde Islands and Desertas Islands; ranges to the eastern Atlantic Ocean
- Pterodroma mollis, soft-plumaged petrel breeds on Gough Island, Antipodes Island, Tristan da Cunha, Marion Island, Crozet Islands, Kerguelan Islands, and Amsterdam Island
  - Pterodroma mollis mollis breeds on Gough Island, Antipodes Island, and Tristan da Cunha
  - Pterodroma mollis dubia breeds on Marion Island, Crozet Islands, Kerguelan Islands, and Amsterdam Island
- Pterodroma baraui, Barau's petrel breeds on Réunion Island and Rodrigues Island
- Pterodroma lessonii, white-headed petrel breeds on islands in the south Indian Ocean and south Pacific Ocean
- Pterodroma inexpectata, mottled petrel breeds on Stewart Island, Snares Islands, and southwestern South Island
- Pterodroma cahow, Bermuda petrel breeds on Nonsuch Island; ranges along the Gulf Stream
- Pterodroma hasitata, black-capped petrel breeds on Cuba, Hispaniola, Guadeloupe, and Dominica; ranges to the west Atlantic
  - Pterodroma hasitata hasitata breeds on Cuba, Hispaniola, Guadeloupe, and Dominica; ranges to the west Atlantic
  - Pterodroma hasitata caribbaea extinct
- Pterodroma externa, Juan Fernandez petrel breeds on Alejandro Selkirk Island
- Pterodroma incerta, Atlantic petrel breeds on Tristan da Cunha and Gough Island; ranges south Atlantic
- Pterodroma phaeopygia, Galapagos petrel breeds on the Galápagos Islands; ranges from Clipperton Island to northern Peru
- Pterodroma sandwichensis, Hawaiian petrel breeds on the Hawaiian Islands; ranges to Polynesia
- Pterodroma cervicalis, white-necked petrel breeds on the Kermadec Islands; ranges to south Pacific
- Pterodroma hypoleuca, Bonin petrel breeds on the Volcano Islands, Bonin Islands, and the western Hawaiian Islands; ranges to Polynesia
- Pterodroma nigripennis, black-winged petrel breeds in the southwest Pacific; ranges to south central Pacific
- Pterodroma axillaris, Chatham petrel breeds on Rangitira Island and adjacent islands
- Pterodroma cookii, Cook's petrel breeds on the islands of the coast of New Zealand; ranges to eastern and northern Pacific
- Pterodroma defilippiana, Masatierra petrel breeds on Juan Fernández Islands, San Ambrosio, and San Félix
- Pterodroma leucoptera, Gould's petrel breeds on the Cook Islands, Fiji, and Cabbage Tree Island off of eastern Australia
  - Pterodroma leucoptera leucoptera breeds on Cabbage Tree Island off of eastern Australia; ranges to the south Pacific
  - Pterodroma leucoptera caledonica breeds on New Caledonia
  - Pterodroma leucoptera brevipes breeds on the Cook Islands and Fiji
- Pterodroma longirostris, Stejneger's petrel breeds on Alejandro Selkirk Island; ranges to eastern and northern Pacific
- Pterodroma pycrofti, Pycroft's petrel breeds on the small islands off the coast of New Zealand; ranges to north Pacific
- Pterodroma alba, Phoenix petrel breeds from French Polynesia to Kermadec Islands; ranges to the south Pacific
- Pterodroma occulta, Vanuatu petrel possible breeds on Banks Islands
