= Imber's petrel =

Imber's petrel Temporal range: Holocene

Conservation status
- Extinct

Scientific classification
- Kingdom: Animalia
- Phylum: Chordata
- Class: Aves
- Order: Procellariiformes
- Family: Procellariidae
- Genus: Pterodroma
- Species: †P. imberi

Binomial name
- †Pterodroma imberi Tennyson, Cooper & Shepherd, 2015

Extinct species of bird

Imber's petrel (Pterodroma imberi) is an extinct seabird of gadfly petrel from the Chatham Islands. The species' epithet commemorates New Zealand ornithologist Mike Imber (1940–2011).

The first remains of Imber's petrel were collected in 1947 but it was not until 1967 when British ornithologist William Richard Postle Bourne considered it as undescribed and extinct species which is distinctive from other gadfly petrels bred on the Chatham Islands. Imber's petrel became apparently extinct as late as the 19th century when the first Europeans colonized the Chatham Islands and their cats preyed on the breeding seabirds.
