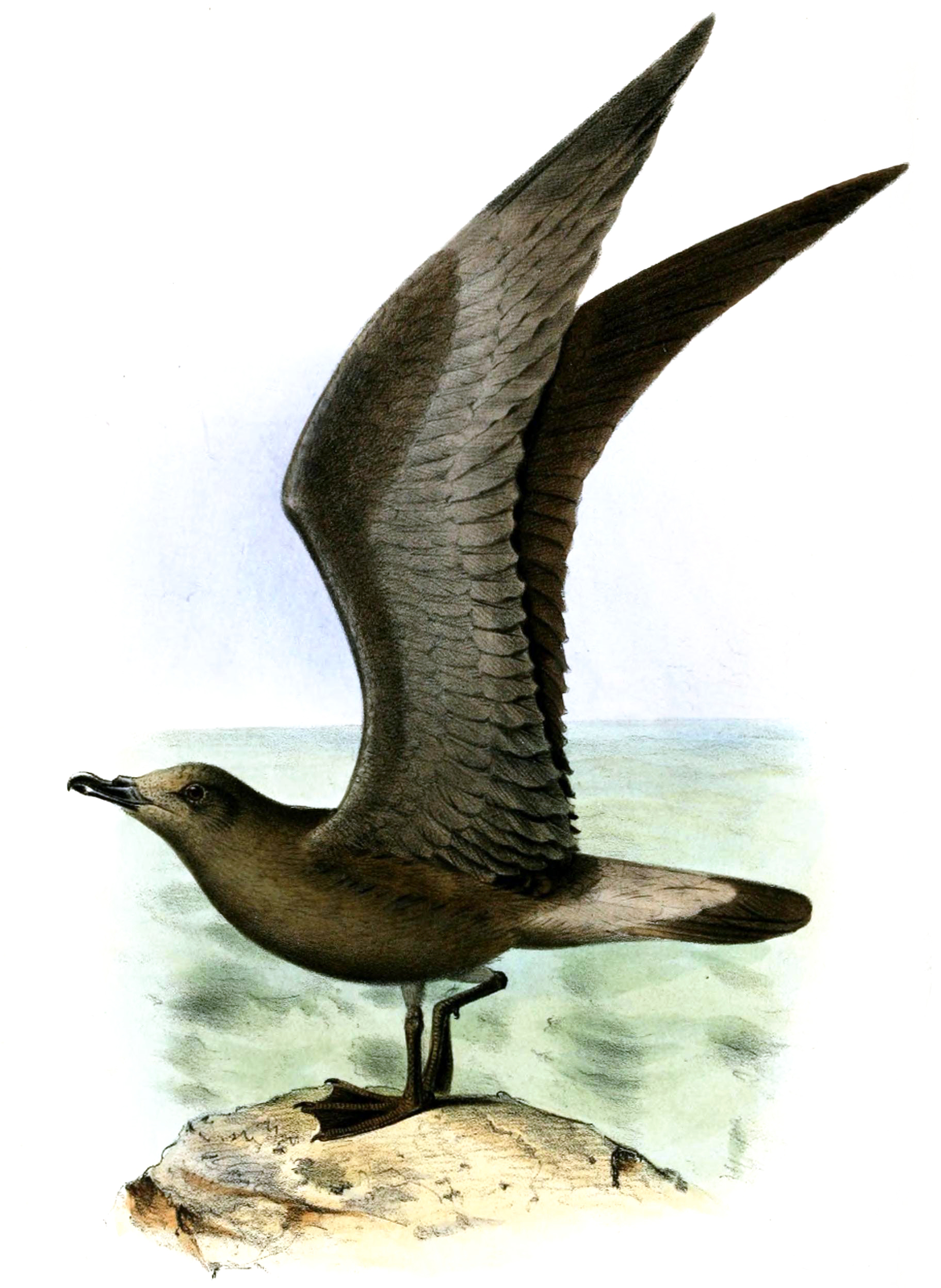
- Illustration by Joseph Smit, 1866

Conservation status
- Critically endangered, possibly extinct (IUCN 3.1)

Scientific classification
- Kingdom: Animalia
- Phylum: Chordata
- Class: Aves
- Order: Procellariiformes
- Family: Procellariidae
- Genus: Pterodroma
- Species: P. caribbaea

Binomial name
- Pterodroma caribbaea Carte, 1866

= Jamaican petrel =

Species of bird

The Jamaican petrel (Pterodroma caribbaea) is a small possibly extinct seabird in the gadfly petrel genus, Pterodroma. It is related to the black-capped petrel (P. hasitata).

== Conservation ==
This species was last collected in 1879, and was searched for without success between 1996 and 2000. However, it cannot yet be classified as extinct because nocturnal petrels are notoriously difficult to record, and it may still occur on Dominica and Guadeloupe. If it is extinct, the most likely cause is due to predation by introduced mongooses and rats.

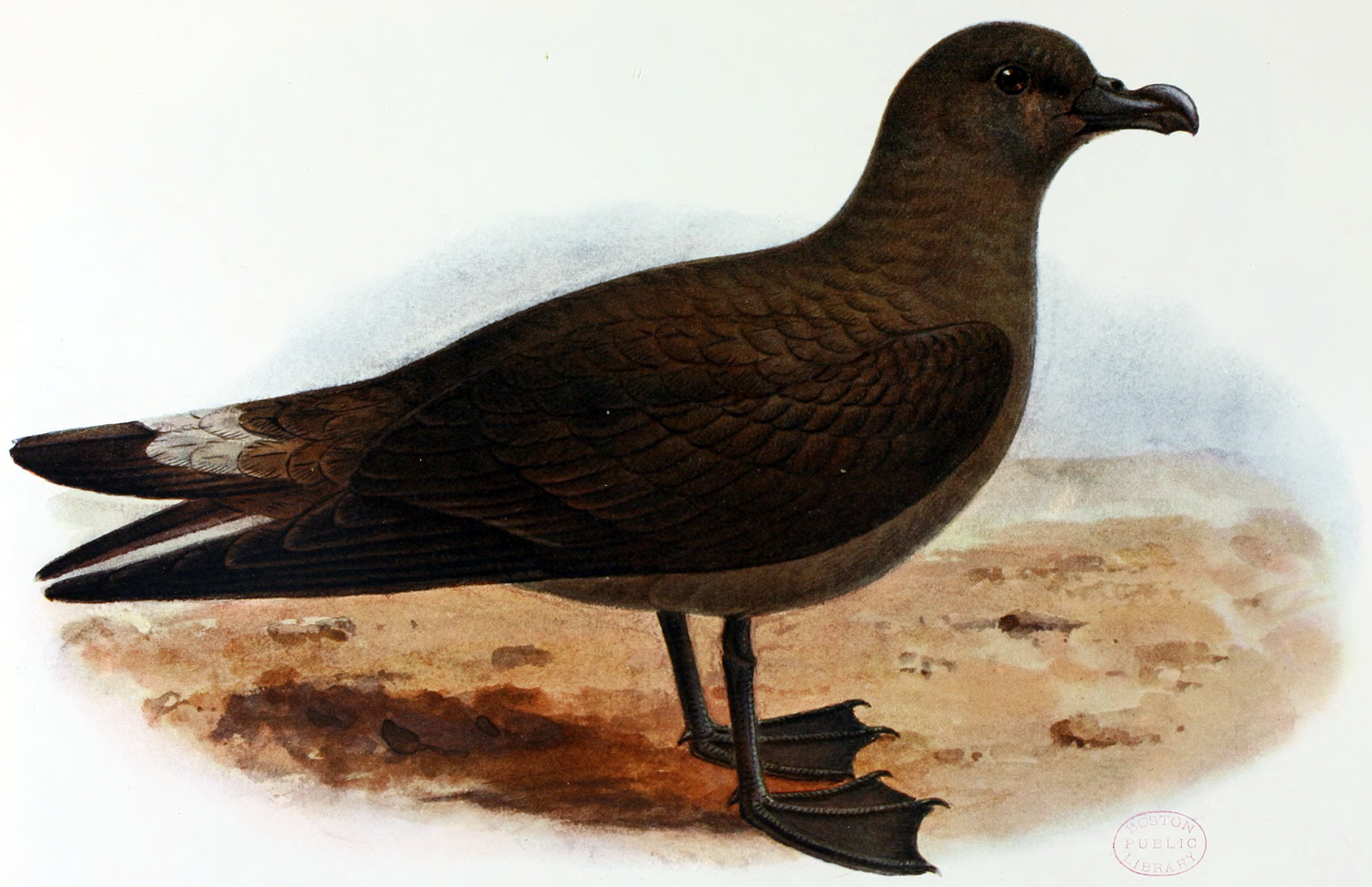
Illustration from 1907

== Parasites ==
Several species of lice are known to have parasitized the Jamaica and black-capped petrels. If the former is extinct, one of these lice, the phtilopterid Saemundssonia jamaicensis may be coextinct, as it has not been found on other birds.
