= Mike Imber =

Ornithologist and expert on petrels (1940–2011)

- Born: November 1940
- Died: 28 April 2011 (aged 70–71)
- Education: Massey University
- Scientific career
- Fields: Ornithology
- Workplaces: Department of Conservation
- Thesis: A study of some effects of increased population density on reproduction in two inbred lines of mice (1965)

Michael John Imber (November 1940 – 28 April 2011) was a New Zealand ornithologist known for his research work and expertise on petrels.

Imber completed a Master's thesis in 1965 at Massey University, on population density and reproduction in mice.

Imber worked for the New Zealand Department of Conservation for 40 years, (including 21 years with its predecessor, the Wildlife Service) as a seabird and waterfowl biologist, retiring in 2006. One of his main early areas of research was on the cephalopod diets of petrels and albatrosses, using regurgitated squid beaks to identify prey taxa. He also travelled extensively, to seabird islands in the course of his research, as well as to seabird conferences and symposia around the world. As well as islands around New Zealand, he visited the subantarctic Prince Edward Islands in the southern Indian Ocean and Gough Island in the South Atlantic.

In 2015, the Imber's petrel (Pterodroma imberi), a newly described extinct gadfly petrel from the Chatham Islands was named in his honour.

== Publications ==
Imber authored or co-authored more than 50 scientific papers and contributed to several books, including the Reader's Digest Book of Zealand Birds, the Handbook of Australian, New Zealand and Antarctic Birds, and the Checklist of New Zealand Birds.
