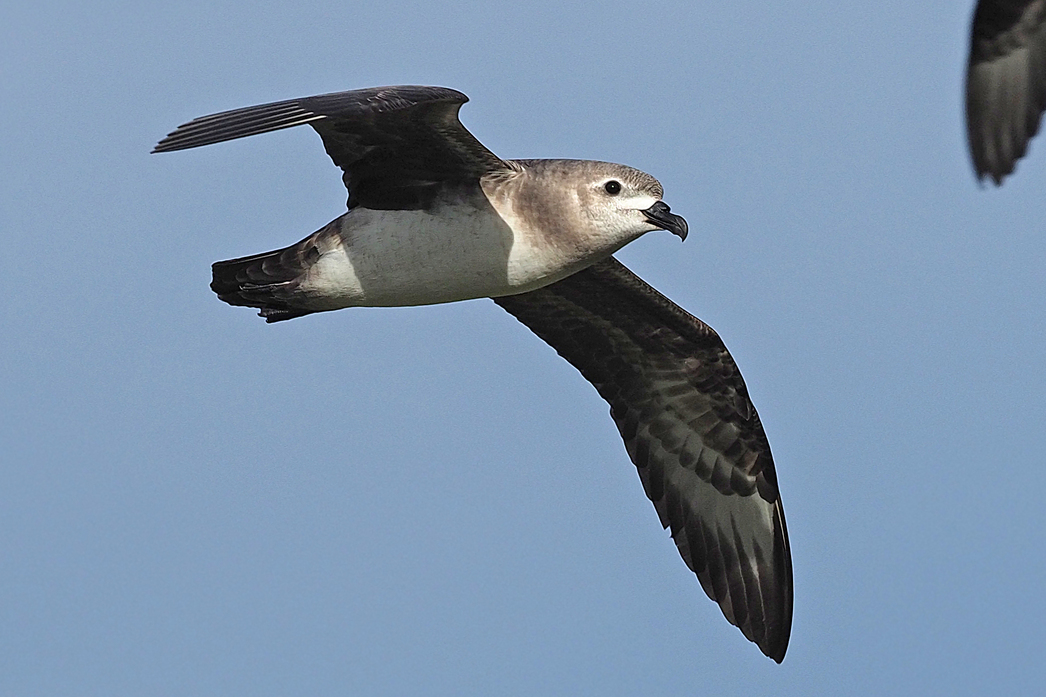
- Adult in flight, Oeno Island

Conservation status
- Least Concern (IUCN 3.1)

Scientific classification
- Kingdom: Animalia
- Phylum: Chordata
- Class: Aves
- Order: Procellariiformes
- Family: Procellariidae
- Genus: Pterodroma
- Species: P. neglecta

Binomial name
- Pterodroma neglecta (Schlegel, 1863)

= Kermadec petrel =

Species of bird

The Kermadec petrel (Pterodroma neglecta) is a species of gadfly petrel in the family Procellariidae. It is 38 cm long with a wingspan of 100 cm. It is polymorphic, with light, dark and intermediate morphs known. It eats squid, fish and other marine creatures.

== Distribution ==
It breeds in the Pacific Ocean from Lord Howe Island to the Juan Fernández Islands. Rarely is the Kermadec petrel recorded west of Lord Howe Island, where it maintains a small colony of less than 100 individuals on Balls Pyramid. In the past it also bred in some numbers on the main islands, however, this is seen as unlikely today. The Kermadec Islands are the only place in New Zealand where this species breeds, including on the following islands of the archipelago: Nugent, Napier, Meyer, Dayrell, North Chanter, Macauley, Haszard and Cheeseman Islands. Due to predation by cats and rats, it no longer breeds on Raoul Island, where in 1908 it had an estimated population of c. 500,000 individuals.

Not much is known of the bird's breeding pattern at Balls Pyramid, however, it usually nests there in late summer. This coincides with the breeding patterns of other birds in the Kermadec Islands. The larger of its two subspecies, P. n. juana, also breeds on Round Island, off Mauritius, where it may sometimes hybridise with the Trindade petrel. The species is a vagrant in Hawaii, Australia and New Zealand, and it is thought to vagrate poleward in response to warmer-than-average sea surface temperatures, suggesting that it may be expanding its foraging range in response to global warming. Reported vagrants in Pennsylvania and North Carolina in the United States and also in the United Kingdom are thought to be dubious.

=== Breeding ===
This species is monogamous and raises a single chick each year, which becomes independent after 100–130 days. The Kermadec petrel is unusual for its wide range of breeding times, with different colonies nesting from October to February or from February to March.

The size of the Australian population of Pterodroma neglecta neglecta (Schlegel, 1863) remains low, partly due to ongoing predation of eggs and chicks by Purple Swamphens Porphyrio porphyrio on Phillip Island.

== Gallery ==
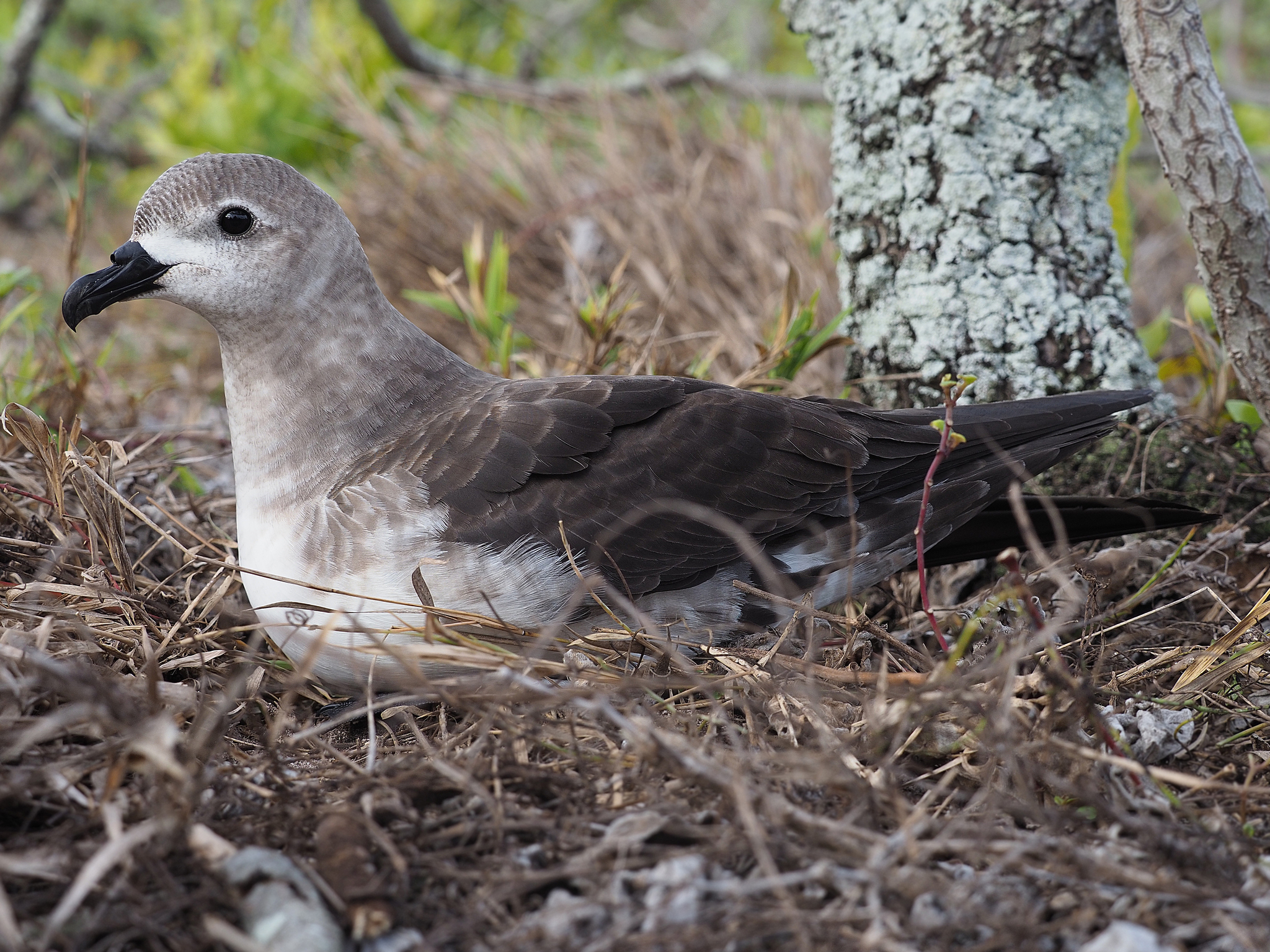
In nest

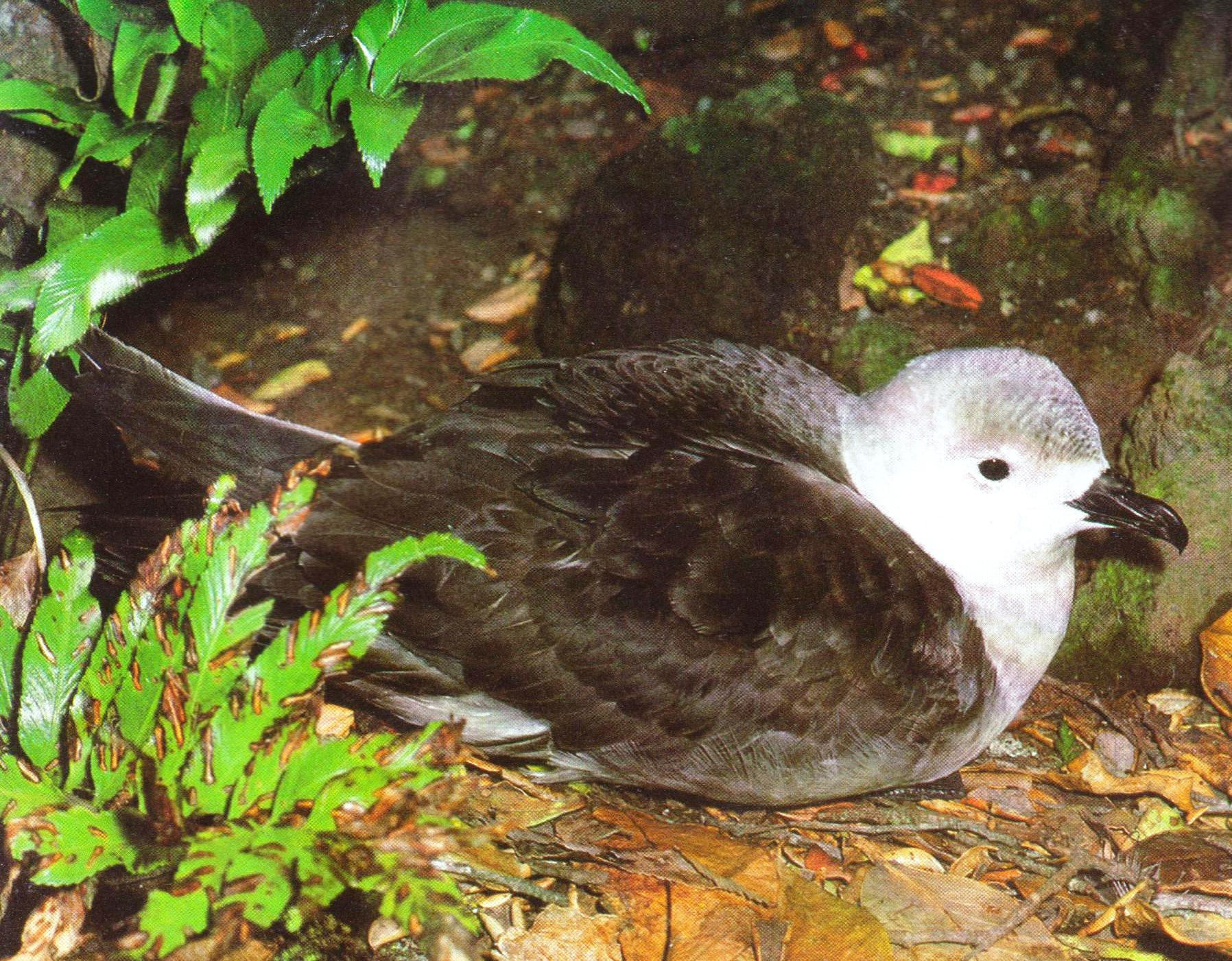
Adult Kermadec petrel

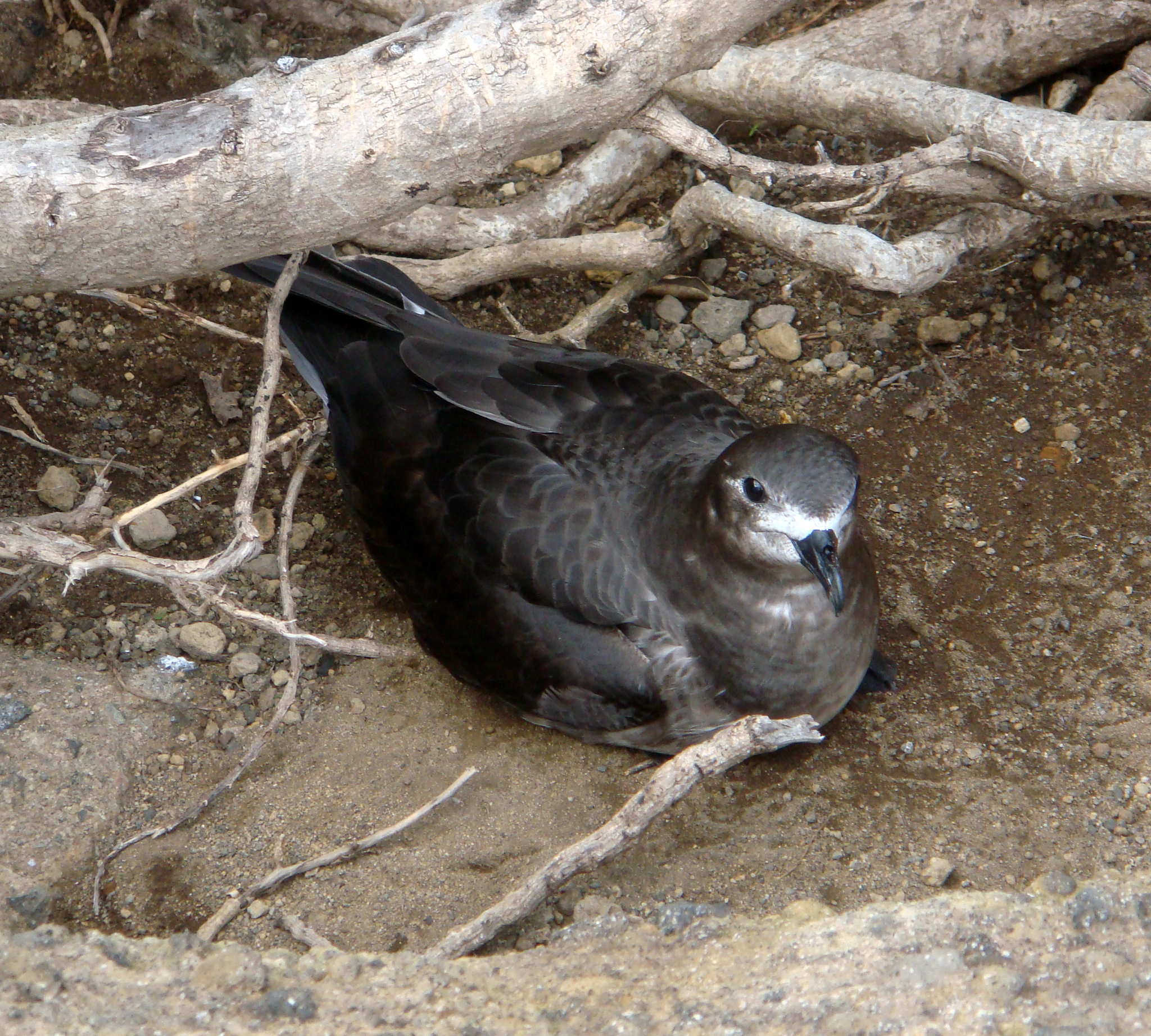
Western Kermadec Petrel P. n. neglecta, Kermadec Islands

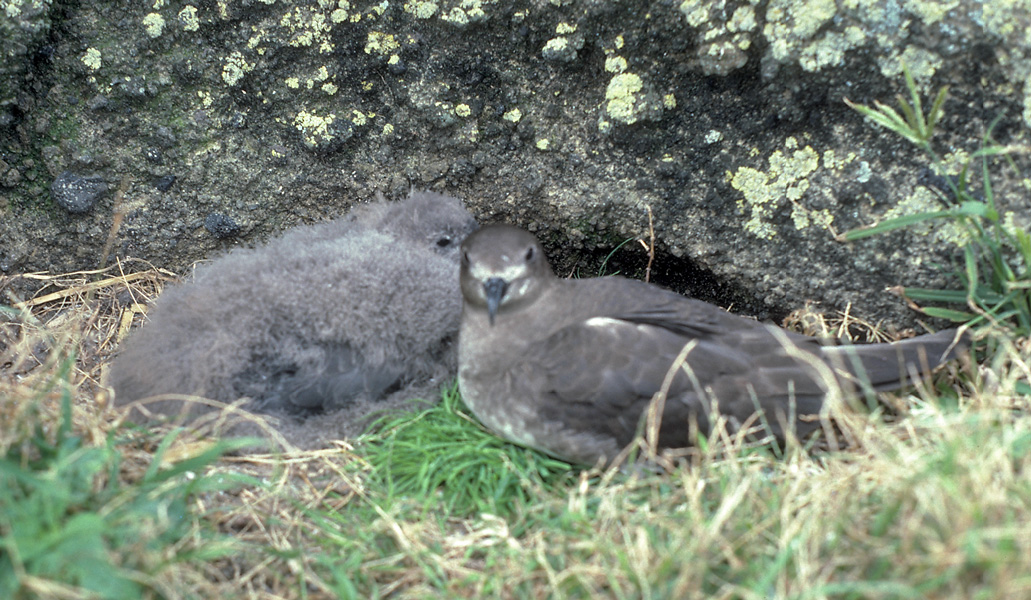
Chick and parent, Meyer Island, 1970s
