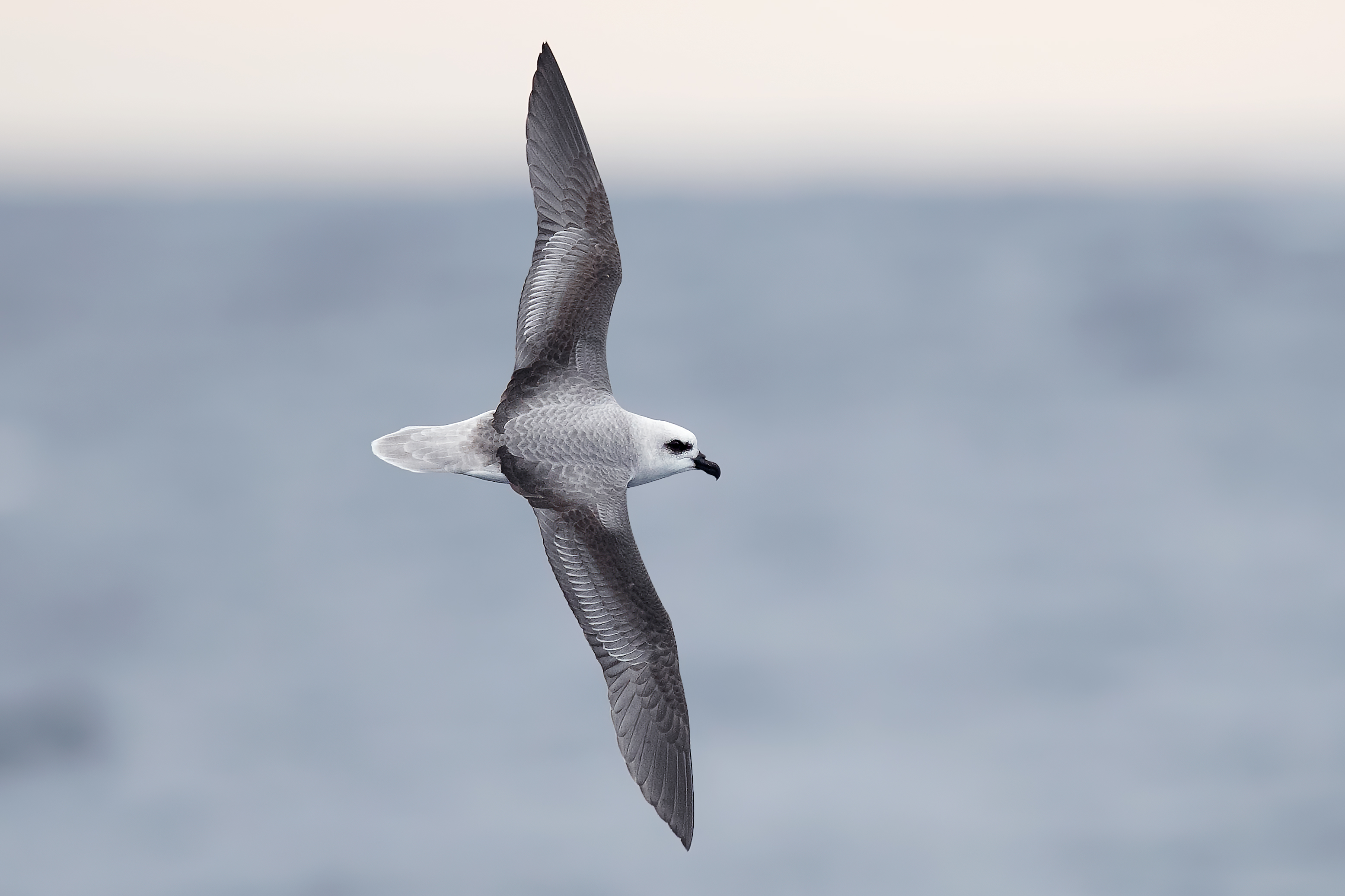

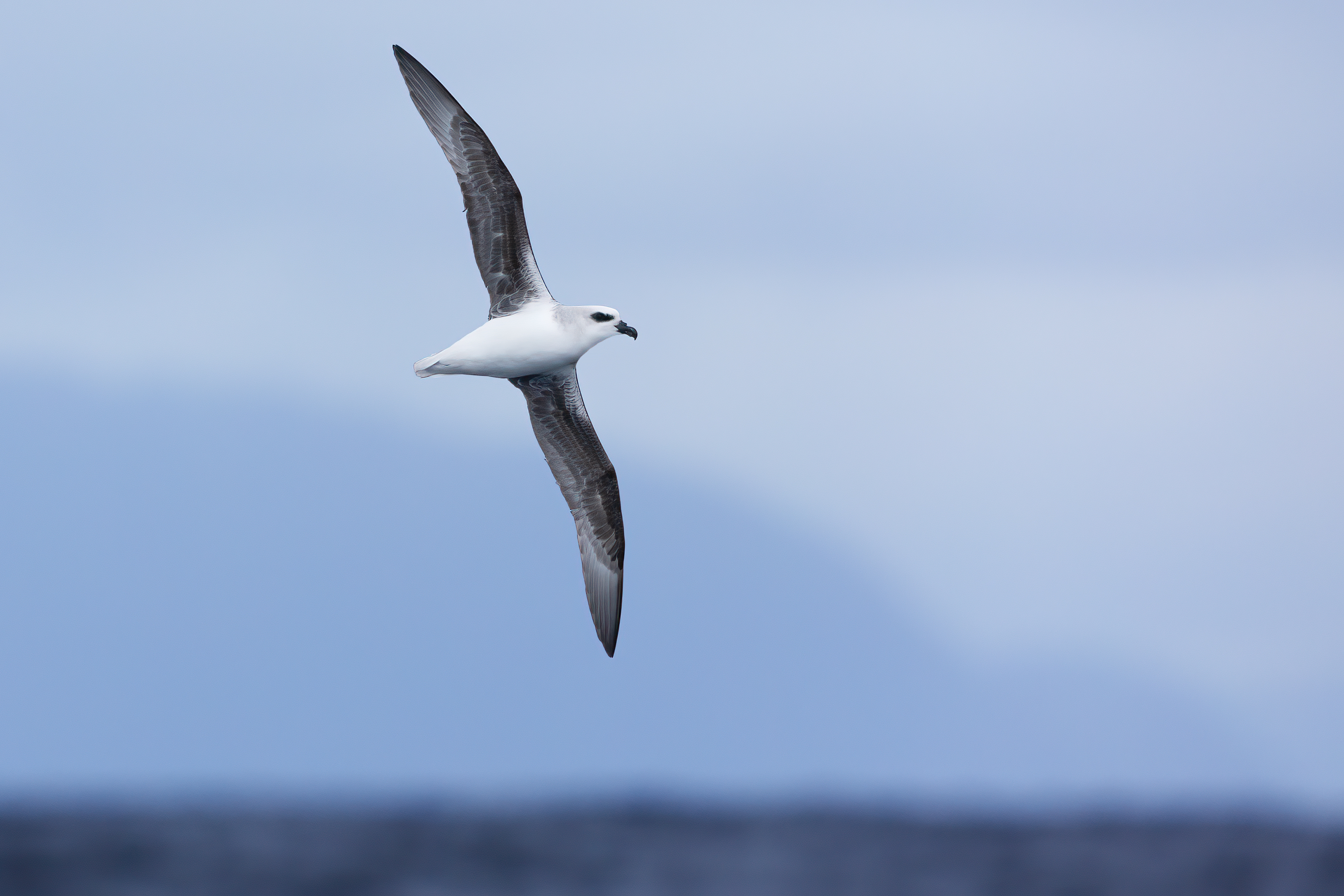

Conservation status
- Least Concern (IUCN 3.1)

Scientific classification
- Kingdom: Animalia
- Phylum: Chordata
- Class: Aves
- Order: Procellariiformes
- Family: Procellariidae
- Genus: Pterodroma
- Species: P. lessonii

Binomial name
- Pterodroma lessonii (Garnot, 1826)

= White-headed petrel =

Species of bird

The white-headed petrel (Pterodroma lessonii), also known as the white-headed fulmar, is a species of seabird in the petrel family, Procellariidae. It is about 400 mm (16 in) in length.

White-headed petrels breed alone or in colonies in burrows dug among tussocks and herbfields on the subantarctic Antipodes and Auckland Islands.

== Diet ==
They appear to feed pelagically on cephalopods and crustaceans.

== Description ==
The white-headed petrel distinct with a pale white head and prominent dark eye patch. It has long narrow wings and long pointed tail. The upper surface is pale grey which is contrasting with darker grey on the upper wings and the rump. The underside is mostly white. The bill is stout black with a large sharp hook. Green glands are prominent. The legs are pinkish to whitish with black patches on the toes.

== Voice ==
The calls are mainly higher-pitched shrill whistles ti-ti-ti or wik-wik-wik and lower-pitched moans ooo-er and or-wik sounds.
