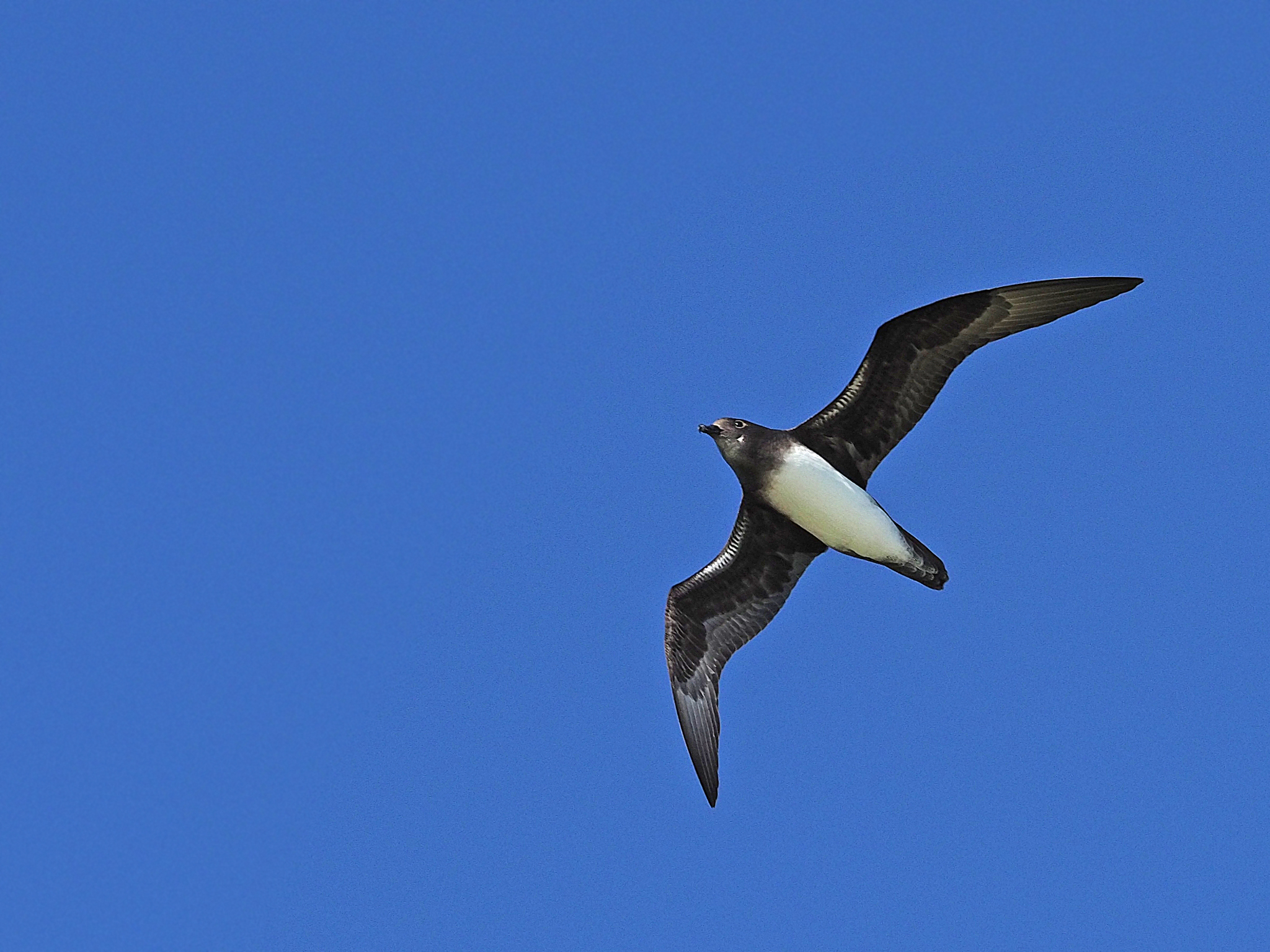
- off Oeno Island

Conservation status
- Vulnerable (IUCN 3.1)

Scientific classification
- Kingdom: Animalia
- Phylum: Chordata
- Class: Aves
- Order: Procellariiformes
- Family: Procellariidae
- Genus: Pterodroma
- Species: P. alba

Binomial name
- Pterodroma alba (Gmelin, JF, 1789)

Synonyms
- Procellaria alba Gmelin, 1789; Procellaria parvirostris Peale, 1848; Rhantistes parvirostris Bp, 1856; Æstrelata parvirostris Coues, 1866; Œstrelata parvirostris Lister, 1891

= Phoenix petrel =

Species of bird

The Phoenix petrel (Pterodroma alba) is a medium-sized tropical seabird, measuring up to 35 cm (1.15 ft) long, with a wingspan of 83 cm (2.72 ft). It has a dark brown upperparts plumage, white below and whitish throat. The sexes are similar.

The Phoenix petrel is found throughout oceans and coastal areas in the central Pacific Ocean. Their colonies can be found on Phoenix, Tonga, Kiritimati, Tuamotu, Marquesas and Pitcairn Island. Females lay one white egg on the ground surface. The diet consists mainly of squid, fish and crustaceans.

Due to ongoing habitat loss, small population size, predation by invasive species and human exploitation, the Phoenix petrel is evaluated as vulnerable on the IUCN Red List of Threatened Species.

== Taxonomy ==
The Phoenix petrel was formally described in 1789 by the German naturalist Johann Friedrich Gmelin in his revised and expanded edition of Carl Linnaeus's Systema Naturae. He placed it with the other petrels in the genus Procellaria and coined the binomial name Procellaria alba. Gmelin based his description on the "white-breasted petrel" that had been described in 1785 by the English ornithologist John Latham from a specimen belonging to the naturalist Joseph Banks. The type locality is Kiritimati (Christmas Island) in the Pacific Ocean. The Phoenix petrel is now one of 35 species placed in the genus Pterodroma that was introduced in 1856 by the French naturalist Charles Lucien Bonaparte. The genus name combines the Ancient Greek pteron meaning "wing" with dromos meaning "racer" or "runner". The specific epithet alba is from Latin albusmeaning "white". The species is monotypic: no subspecies are recognised.
