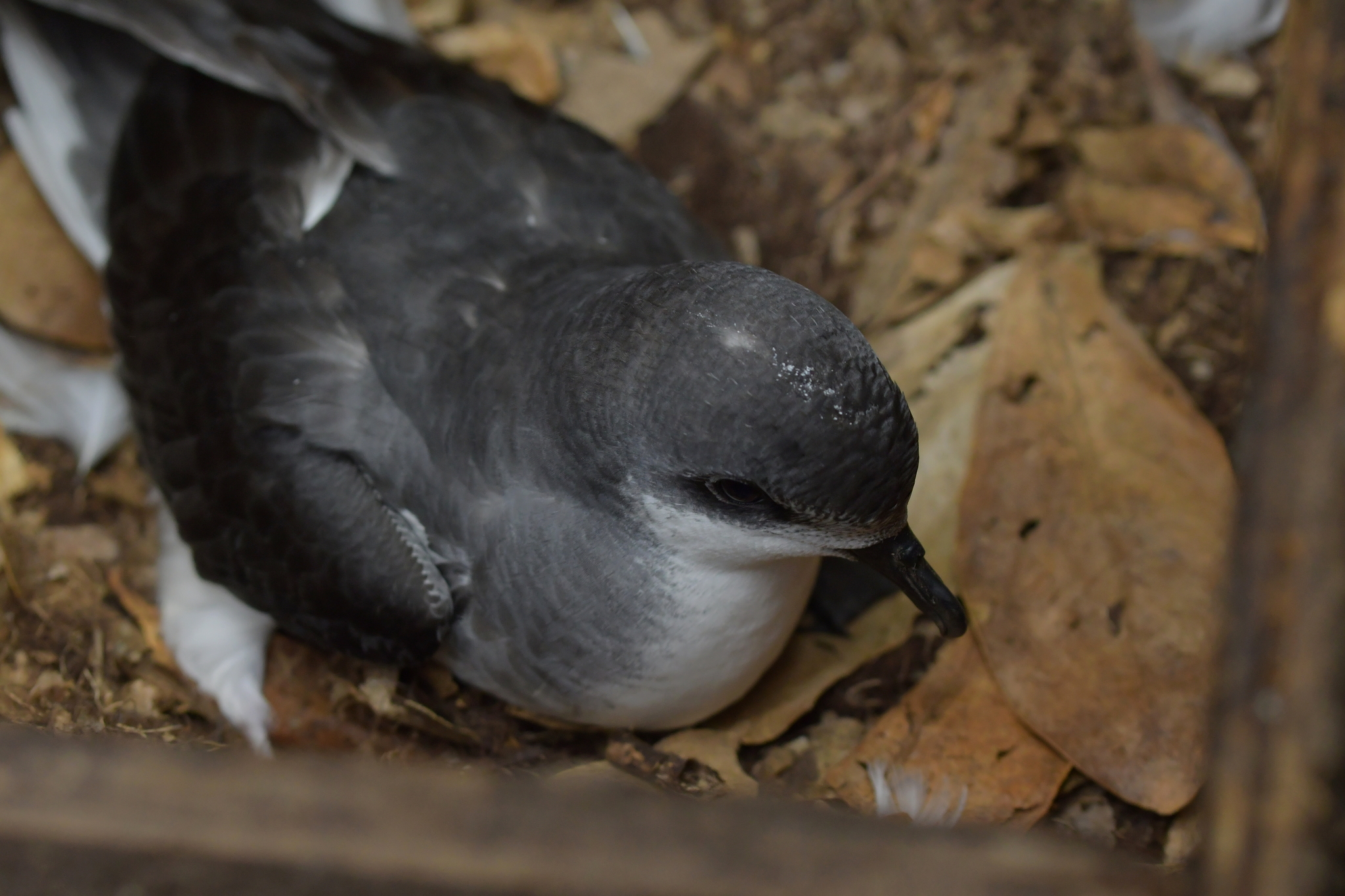

Conservation status
- Vulnerable (IUCN 3.1)

Scientific classification
- Kingdom: Animalia
- Phylum: Chordata
- Class: Aves
- Order: Procellariiformes
- Family: Procellariidae
- Genus: Pterodroma
- Species: P. axillaris

Binomial name
- Pterodroma axillaris (Salvin, 1893)

Synonyms
- Oestrelata axillaris

= Chatham Islands petrel =

Species of bird

The Chatham Islands petrel (Pterodroma axillaris), also known as the Chatham petrel or ranguru (Māori), is a medium-sized, grey, white and black gadfly petrel. It only breeds on the Chatham Islands, New Zealand, and until recently was restricted to the 218-hectare Rangatira or South-East Island.

== Description ==
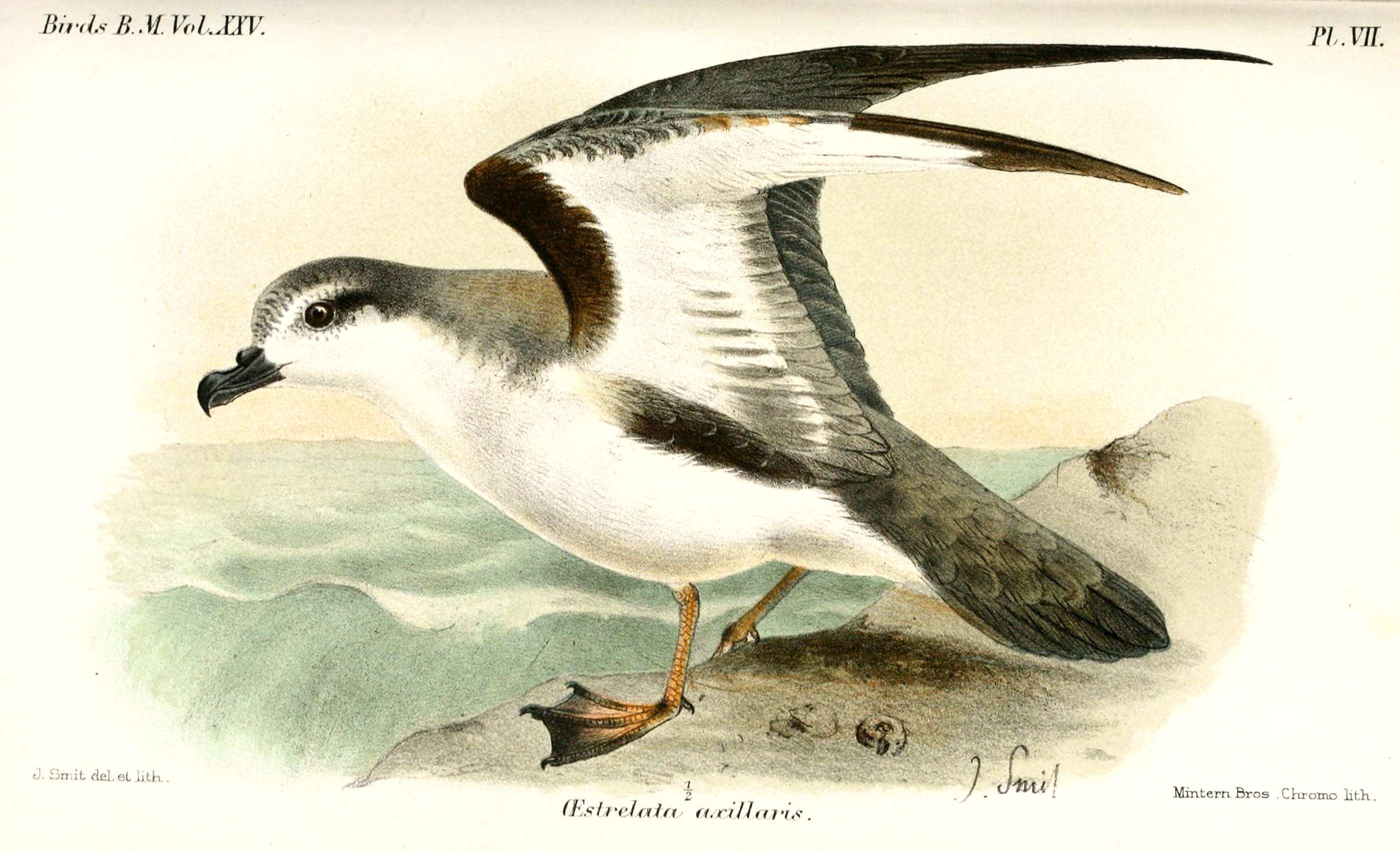
Illustration by Joseph Smit, 1896

The Chatham Islands petrel is a medium-sized petrel with a mottled dark-grey and white forehead, dark grey back and upper wings, and white underparts. A black diagonal bar extends from the leading edge of underwing to a black 'armpit'. The shoulders and upper-wing coverts are a deeper grey giving a dark M pattern across the spread upper wings.

The bill is black and strongly hooked tip. The eye is dark, and the legs and feet are pink, with dark outer toes and webs. The sexes are alike.

Chatham Islands petrels are rarely observed away from the colony; the few at-sea records are from ships in oceanic waters.

== Breeding ==
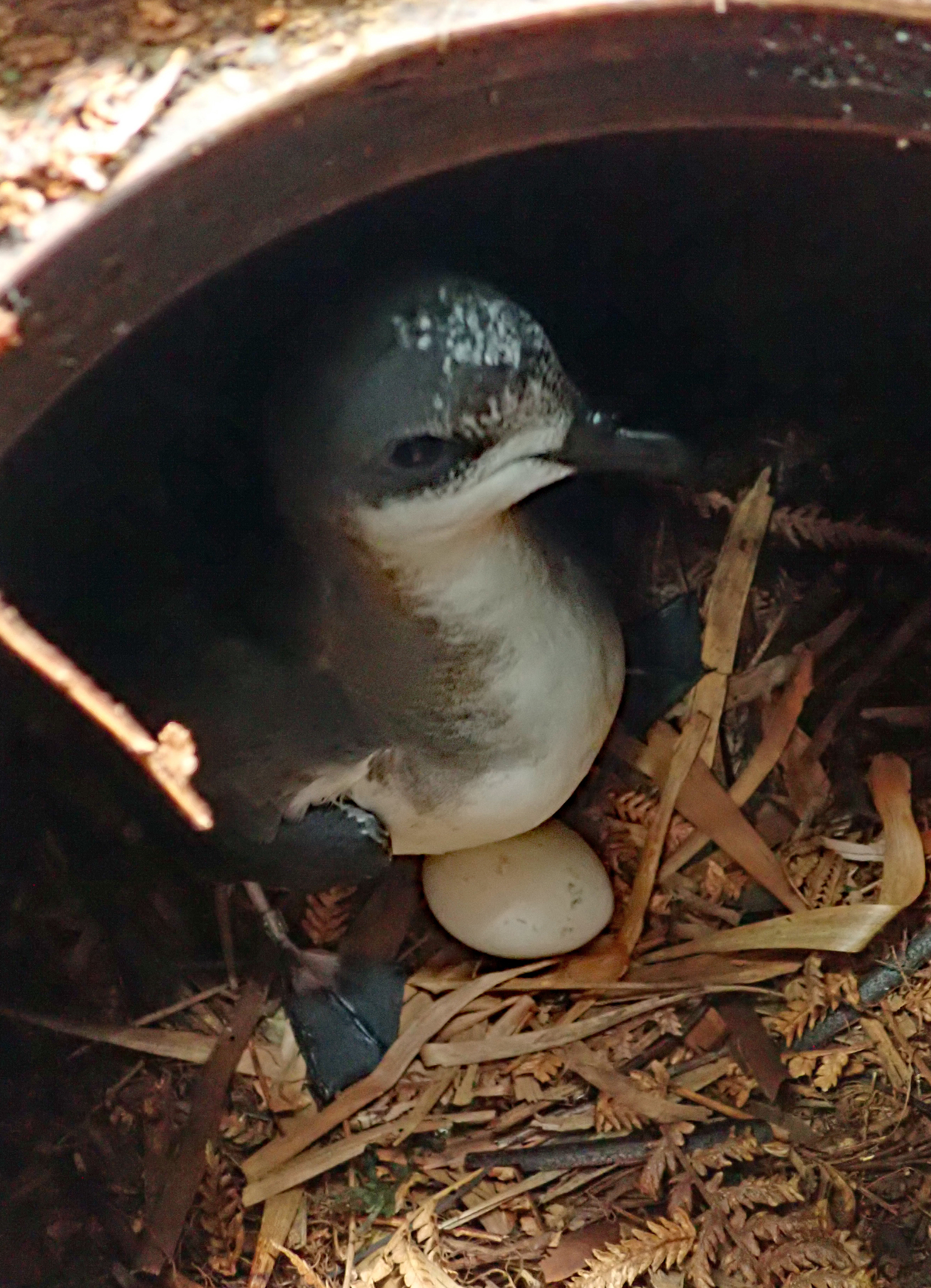
Chatham Islands petrel in nesting box, on egg

Chatham Islands petrels nest in burrows under the forest canopy to which they are generally faithful to over time. Leaves are used as nesting material. Each pair lays a single white egg in December or January and the chicks fledge in May or June.

== Distribution ==
This species breeds only in the Chatham Islands.

== Status and threats ==
The population is estimated at 2,000 birds and is classified as nationally vulnerable. Fossil evidence shows this species was present throughout the Chatham group before the arrival of humans, predation by humans and introduced mammals (rats and cats) and the loss of forest habitat saw the species restricted to Rangatira island. Before conservation efforts began, the size of the Rangatira population was limited by burrow competition with the broad-billed prion Pachyptila vittata, of which an estimated 330,000 pairs inhabit the island.

=== Conservation management ===
Conservation efforts for the Chatham Islands petrel started in the late 1980s, the initial focus of which was locating burrows and determining the cause of breeding failure. Once it was determined that burrow competition from broad-billed prions was causing most breeding attempts to fail, attention shifted to protection of burrows and chicks from prion interference. Burrows are located using telemetry - adult birds caught on the surface are fitted with a small transmitter and tracked to their burrows. Burrows are then protected by installing a plastic or wooden artificial burrow (to guard against collapse) and protected from prion entry by the fitting of a neoprene flap over the burrow entrance. Burrows are also blocked over the non-breeding period to ensure they are not occupied by prions during the petrels' winter absence. In the 2005/06 breeding season of the 155 known breeding pairs on Rangatira, 83% were successful in fledging their chick.

The transfer of 200 chicks to a predator-proof fenced area on nearby Pitt Island/Rangiauria over the four years 2002-05 has seen the return of small number of birds to the site and the first breeding occur (with the fledging of 1 chick) in the 2005/06 season and four breeding pairs in 2006/07. The transfer of 200 chicks over four years to a predator-proof fenced site on the South coast of Chatham Island started in April 2008 with the translocation of 47 chicks.
