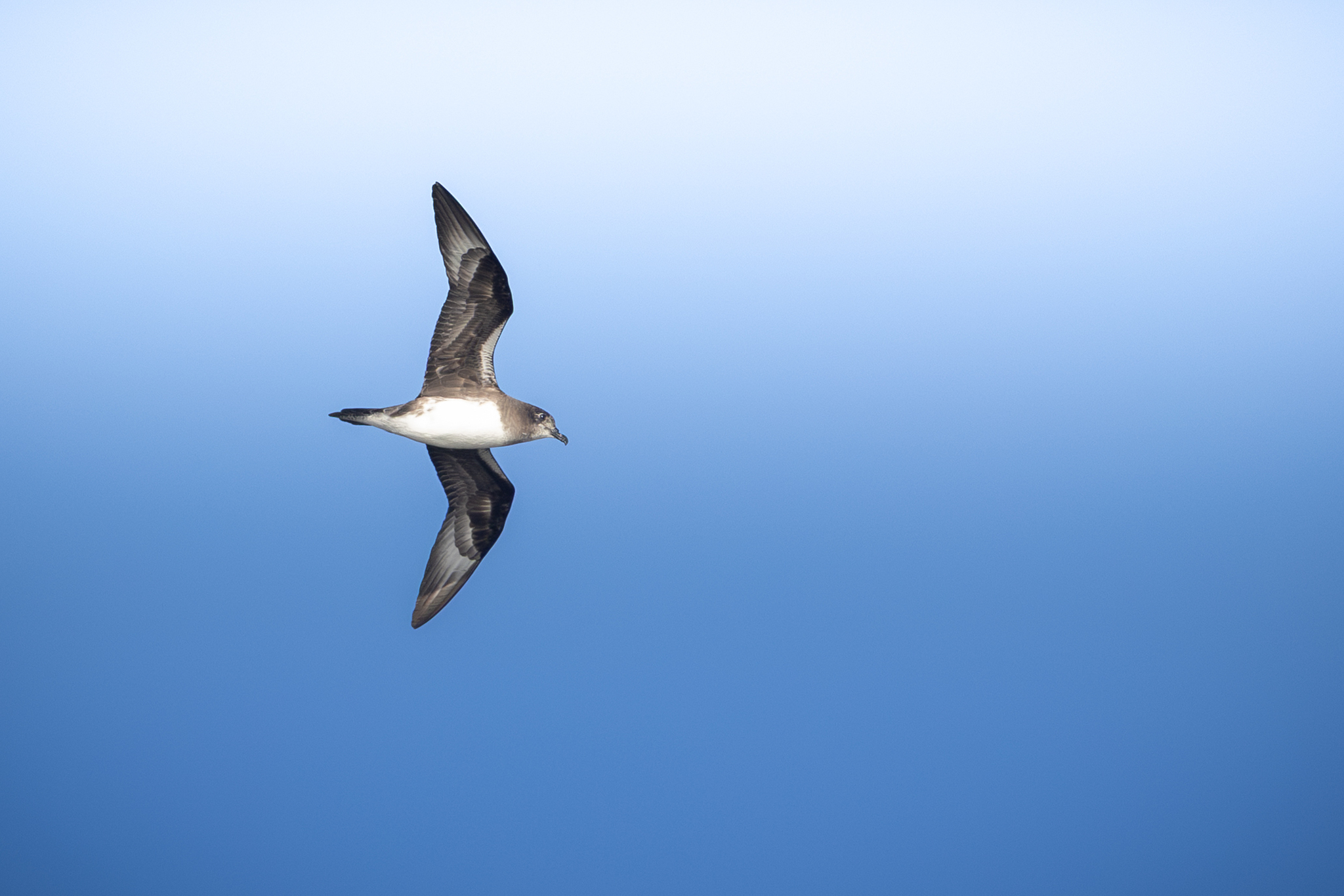

Conservation status
- Least Concern (IUCN 3.1)

Scientific classification
- Kingdom: Animalia
- Phylum: Chordata
- Class: Aves
- Order: Procellariiformes
- Family: Procellariidae
- Genus: Pterodroma
- Species: P. heraldica

Binomial name
- Pterodroma heraldica (Salvin, 1888)

= Herald petrel =

Species of bird

The Herald petrel (Pterodroma heraldica) is a species of seabird and a member of the gadfly petrels. Its range includes the south Pacific Ocean and Indian Ocean.

== Description ==
The bird is 35–39 cm (14–15 in) in size, with an 88–102 cm (35–40 in) wingspan. It was formerly considered conspecific with the Trindade petrel and Henderson petrel.

This petrel has various colour morphs: dark and light, as well as intermediates between the two.

== Habitat and range ==
The Herald petrel nests on oceanic islands and atolls, on cliff ledges, ridges or rocky slopes. On some islands, nesting birds are threatened by feral cats and rats.

Found primarily in the south Pacific, it has been seen in Hawaii. In May 2007, a Herald petrel tagged on Raine Island in 1984 was observed off the coast of Mauritius in the Indian Ocean. This greatly increases the known life span and range of the species. In 2009 it was identified as this species, from what was previously an unidentified Pterodroma species, to be breeding on Round Island, 22 km (14 mi) north of Mauritius, in the Indian Ocean.

In August 2017, Queensland Parks and Wildlife Services (QPWS) staff confirmed a Herald petrel chick had hatched on Raine Island after sighting an adult Herald petrel taking care of a single egg in a nest in June 2017. The sighted chick was the first time a Herald petrel was seen to breed in 30 years. Raine Island is the only known Herald petrel breeding site in Australia.

== Conservation status ==
This species is evaluated as "Least Concern" on the IUCN Red List of Threatened Species.

It is listed as critically endangered under the Australian Environment Protection and Biodiversity Conservation Act 1999 (EPBC Act), effective July 2002, and under the Queensland Government's Nature Conservation (Animals) Regulation 2020 (November 2021 list). While there was previously a recovery plan in effect for the species from 2005 to 2015, as it has a high level of protection from government agencies, with relatively few, well-managed threats on the Raine Island population, there is no recovery plan operational as of July 2022.

A 2018 study ranked the species ninth in a list of Australian birds most likely to go extinct.
