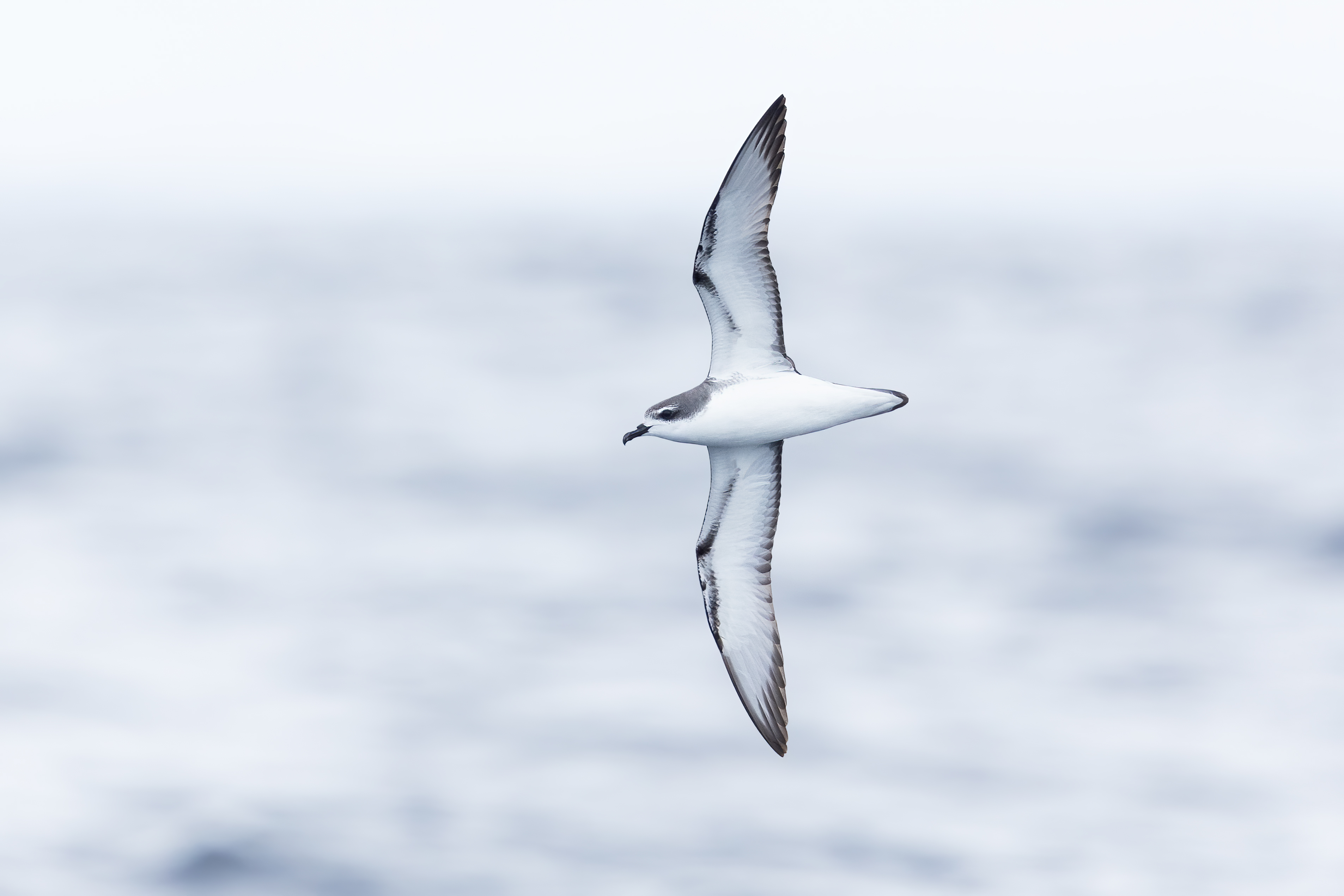

Conservation status
- Vulnerable (IUCN 3.1)

Scientific classification
- Kingdom: Animalia
- Phylum: Chordata
- Class: Aves
- Order: Procellariiformes
- Family: Procellariidae
- Genus: Pterodroma
- Species: P. cookii

Binomial name
- Pterodroma cookii (G.R. Gray, 1843)

Synonyms
- Procellaria cookii G. R. Gray, 1843 Procellaria velox G. R. Gray, 1844 (nomen novum) Pterodroma cookii orientalis Murphy, 1929

= Cook's petrel =

Species of bird

Cook's petrel (Pterodroma cookii) or tītī (Māori), blue-footed petrel, is a Procellariiform seabird endemic to New Zealand. It is a member of the gadfly petrels and part of the subgenus Cookilaria Bonaparte, 1856, which includes the very similar Stejneger's petrel.

== Morphology ==
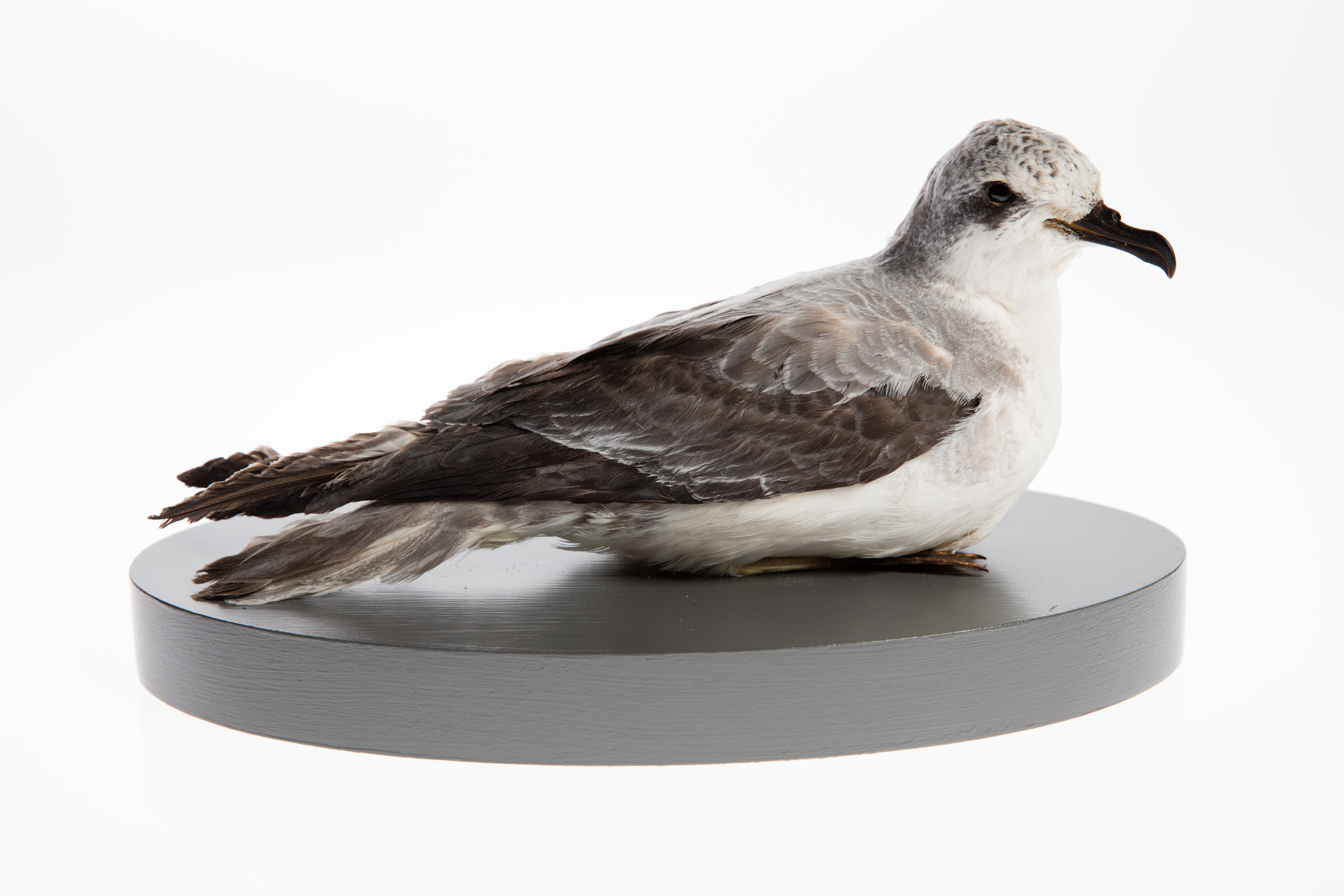
Cook's petrel mount from the collection of Auckland Museum

One of the smallest petrels, Cook's petrel is typically 25–30 cm (9.8–11.8 in) in length with a 65–66 cm (26–26 in) wingspan and a weight of around 200 g (7.1 oz). Its colouration is typical of gadfly petrels: pale grey upperparts with a dark grey "M" on the wings and white underparts.

The bill is long and black with tubular nostrils on both sides. As in all members of the order Procellariiformes, this nostril configuration enables an exceptionally acute sense of smell, which the birds use to locate food and nest sites in the dark.

== Diet ==
Cook's petrel feeds mostly on fish and squid, with some crustaceans taken. The species is highly pelagic except when nesting.

== Habitat ==
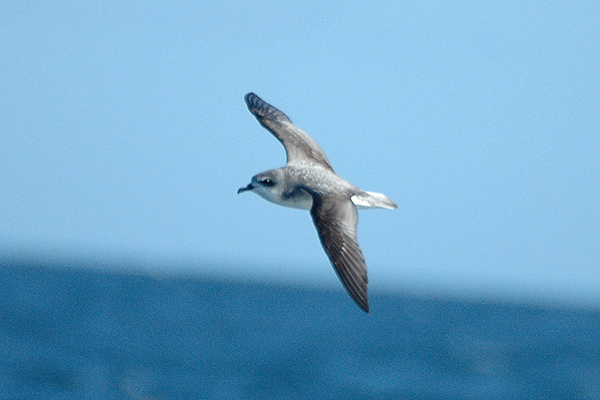
Cook's petrel photographed in Hauraki Gulf, New Zealand

Cook's petrel breeds only in New Zealand on three small islands: Little Barrier Island, Great Barrier Island, and Codfish Island. The breeding season is the southern summer, from October to May. It nests in burrows and rock crevices, preferring sites on thickly forested ridges. Its call is a three-part kek, kek, kek. The species was formerly more numerous; the current population estimate is 1,258,000 and declining. It is classified as vulnerable because it breeds on only three small islands. While Little Barrier Island's population remains stable, the other two populations are decreasing. On Great Barrier Island, introduced pigs, dogs, rats, and cats attack nests and burrows, as do native weka (a flightless rail), preying on eggs and nestlings and reducing the population from an estimated 20,000 to 100. Fossils show that prior to the arrival of humans to New Zealand, Cook's petrel used to breed on the mainland New Zealand North and South Islands.

Cook's petrel migrates to the Pacific Ocean from New Zealand when it is not breeding. It has sometimes been seen off the west coast of the United States and off the west coast of tropical South America.
