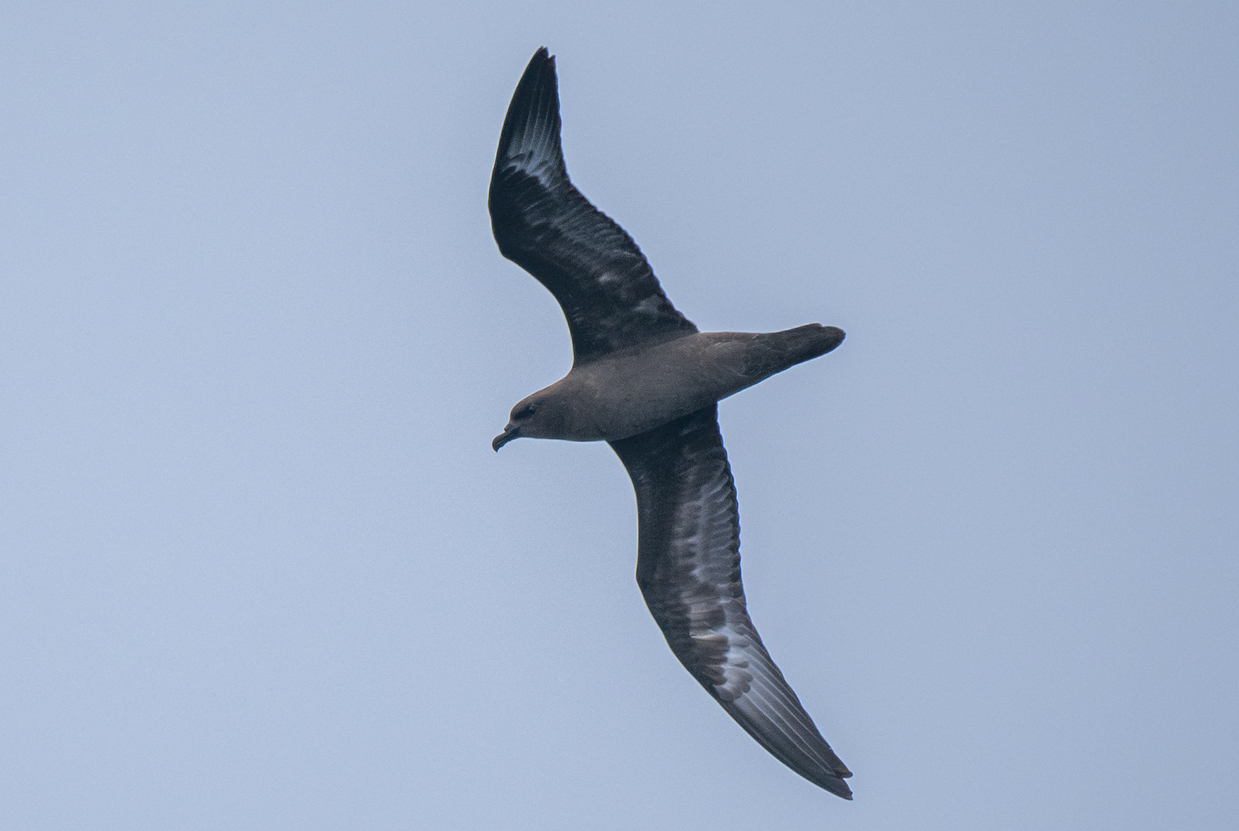

Conservation status
- Vulnerable (IUCN 3.1)

Scientific classification
- Kingdom: Animalia
- Phylum: Chordata
- Class: Aves
- Order: Procellariiformes
- Family: Procellariidae
- Genus: Pterodroma
- Species: P. arminjoniana

Binomial name
- Pterodroma arminjoniana (Giglioli & Salvadori, 1869)

Synonyms
- Aestrelata arminjoniana protonym

= Trindade petrel =

Species of bird

The Trindade petrel (Pterodroma arminjoniana), also known as the Round island petrel, is a species of seabird and a member of the gadfly petrels. The bird is 35–39 cm (14–15 in) in size, with an 88–102 cm (35–40 in) wingspan.

The petrel has various color morphs: dark and light, as well as intermediates between the two. Previously, two separate populations were considered conspecific, one occurring in the south Pacific, sometimes seen in Hawaii; the other occurring in the south Atlantic, nesting off Brazil, with regular sightings in the Gulf Stream off the southeastern United States. The little-known Pacific birds were then split and determined distinct as the Herald petrel, Pterodroma heraldica. It uses oceanic islands and atolls, nesting on cliff ledges, ridges or rocky slopes. On some islands, nesting birds are threatened by feral cats and rats.

Due to ongoing habitat loss and small breeding range, this species is evaluated as vulnerable on the IUCN Red List of Threatened Species.

The specific name is after Vittorio Arminjon, captain of the ship during the voyage in which the specimen was collected.

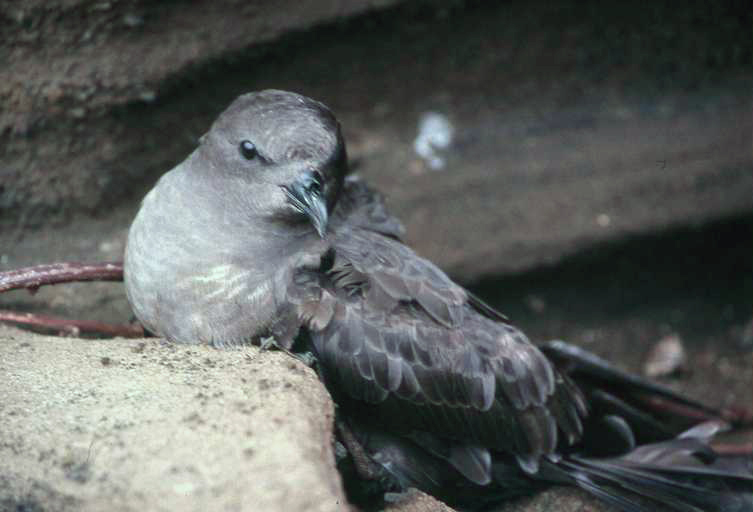
Pterodroma arminjoniana, dark phase adult, on Round Island (Mauritius)
