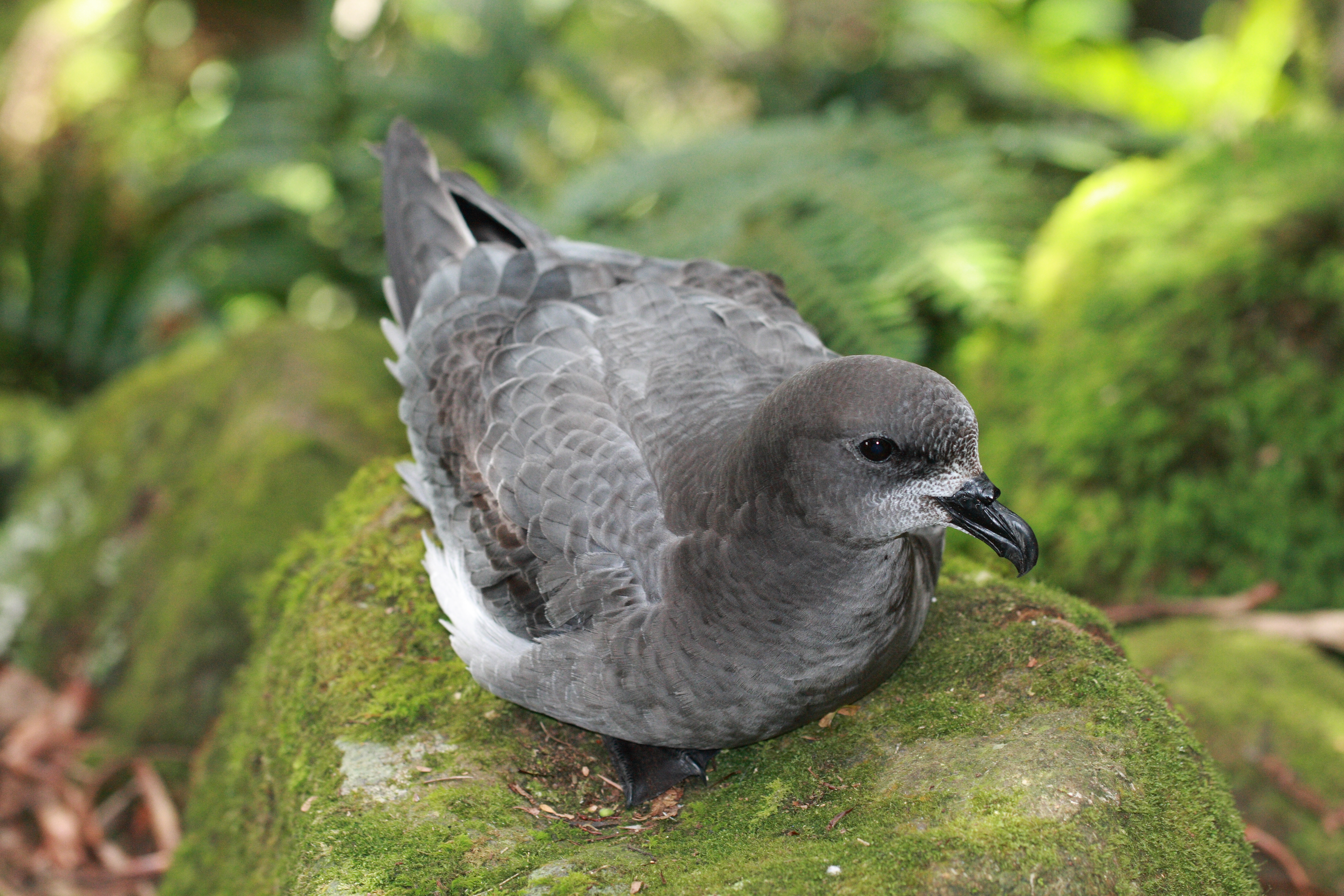
- Providence petrel near the summit of Mount Gower, Lord Howe Island

Conservation status
- Least Concern (IUCN 3.1)

Scientific classification
- Kingdom: Animalia
- Phylum: Chordata
- Class: Aves
- Order: Procellariiformes
- Family: Procellariidae
- Genus: Pterodroma
- Species: P. solandri

Binomial name
- Pterodroma solandri (Gould, 1844)

= Providence petrel =

Species of bird

The providence petrel (Pterodroma solandri) is a large and heavy build gadfly petrel that nests in two locations in the Tasman Sea: Lord Howe Island (some 800 km from the Australian mainland) and Philip Island.

The scientific name of this species was given in honour of the Swedish botanist Daniel Solander, with Solander's petrel being an alternative common name.

== Behaviour and ecology ==
This bird was once numerous on Norfolk Island, however an estimated 1 million birds were harvested for food, and was completely exterminated on this island by 1800. It was also threatened by the introduction of mammalian predators in the late 18th century.

This species is classified as least concern. However, the providence petrel is deemed to be in a precarious position because its breeding is confined to two mountain tops and one tiny islet, and is therefore at great risk from a catastrophe.

Graceful and supple in flight, the providence petrel has a cumbersome propensity on the ground, making it vulnerable to attack by predators. Main in causes of death are predation by the endangered Lord Howe rail and flooding of burrows. Other dangers include rat predation and drowning in longline fishing gear. The current population is estimated at only 64,000.

More than 99% of the global population now breeds on Lord Howe Island, where approximately 32,000 pairs nest on Mt Gower and Mt Lidgbird with some additional birds nesting on the lower slopes and Northern Hills.

"Diet and foraging behaviour of the Providence Petrel Pterodroma solandri on Lord Howe Island, Australia, were investigated during three consecutive breeding seasons. Diet consisted largely of squid (predominantly Cranchiidae, Onychoteuthidae, Spirulidae and Histioteuthidae) and fish (principally Myctophidae), with crustaceans (mainly Decapoda and Isopoda) being somewhat less important."

Some populations are diurnal, while others are nocturnal. This may be a result of different foraging areas or historical predators that are no longer present.
