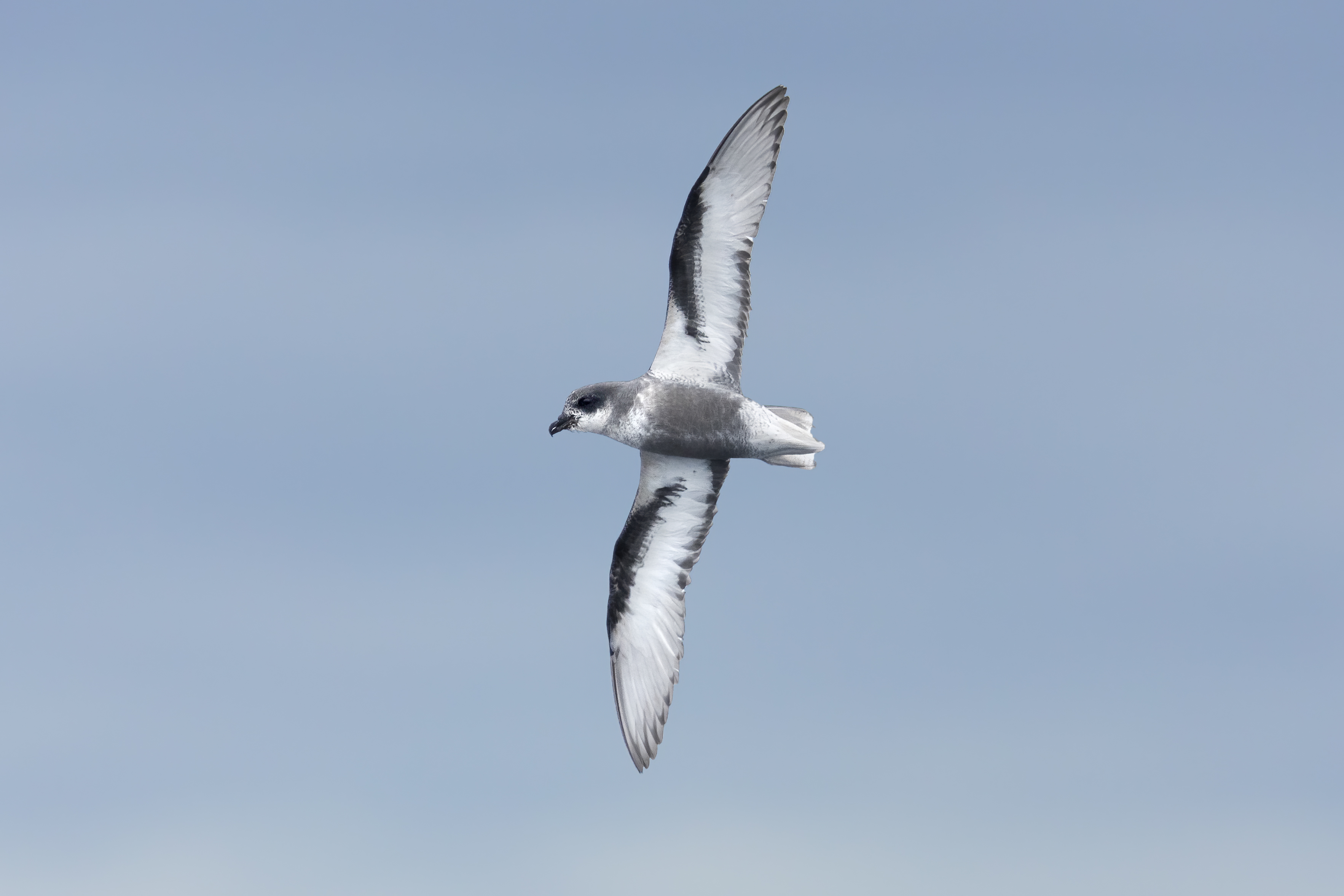

Conservation status
- Near Threatened (IUCN 3.1)

Scientific classification
- Kingdom: Animalia
- Phylum: Chordata
- Class: Aves
- Order: Procellariiformes
- Family: Procellariidae
- Genus: Pterodroma
- Species: P. inexpectata

Binomial name
- Pterodroma inexpectata (J. R. Forster, 1844)

Synonyms
- Procellaria inexpectata J. R. Forster, 1844 Procellaria raolensis Bonaparte, 1857 (nomen novum) Procellaria gularis Peale, 1848 Procellaria affinis Buller, 1874 Aestrelata fisheri Ridgway, 1883 Aestrelata scalaris Brewster, 1896 Procellaria lugens Mathews, 1912 Pterodroma neglus Mathews, 1928 (nomen novum) Pterodroma inexpectata thompsoni Mathews, 1915

= Mottled petrel =

Species of bird

The mottled petrel (Pterodroma inexpectata) or kōrure is a species of seabird and a member of the gadfly petrels. It usually attains 33 to 35 cm (13–14 in) in length with a 74 to 82 cm (29–32 in) wingspan.

This species is highly pelagic, rarely approaching land, except to nest and rear young. The mottled petrel feeds mostly on fish and squid, with some crustaceans taken. It is a transequatorial migrant, breeding in the islands of New Zealand, and migrating to the Bering Sea, concentrating in the Gulf of Alaska and the Aleutian Islands.

It was previously found on mainland New Zealand North and South Islands, but is now only found on smaller off-shore islands near Fiordland, Stewart Island and Snares Islands, with the largest populations on Codfish Island, Big South Cape Island and the Snares Islands.

The mottled petrel uses burrows and rock crevices to nest in. It was formerly more numerous than today. The species' numbers have been and continue to be affected by predation by introduced mammals. Chicks have been reintroduced to Maungaharuru, hills 24 km from the sea, in Hawke's Bay.

== Breeding ==
The breeding behaviour of the mottled petrel is similar to that of the sooty shearwater (Adrenna grisea). Adults return to the nesting islands in late October. The beginning of the breeding season ranges between November 21 to December 10th with the laying season lasting nineteen days. They breed on many islands, including Whero Island, Big South Cape Island, and Snaves Island. Big South Cape Island, located off Stewart Island, holds most of the population of New Zealand's mottled petrel.

Nests can be found in secluded burrows surrounded by vegetation containing only a single egg. The eggs of the mottled petrel are relatively large in proportion to the size of the bird. The mean length of the eggs being 58.6mm ± 1.5, with a mean width of 42.7mm ± 0.77, and a mean weight of 53.2g ± 3.2. This makes the adult bird only six times heavier than the egg. The incubation period lasts around fifty-four days, with the last of the eggs hatching mid-February.

Parent birds only return to their nests at night after their egg has hatched. Chicks are brooded for two days. They fledge when they are 90–105 days old, the last of the chicks departing in June. The weight of the chicks increased by 66grams within six days. Both parents feed their chick, and the chicks are fed at night.

== Migration ==
The mottled petrel is the only gadfly petrel that is seen far south in the Antarctic and Pacific Arctic waters. They migrate at a steady, fast pace, they start heading north in May and the migratory period lasts about 1.5 months.^{,} They are seen migrating to different areas in the north pacific, depending on water temperature and where their prey is most abundant. P. inexpectata migrate alone or in pairs, showing their solitary nature.

== Foraging and Feeding ==
P. inexpectata feast alone, not joining in with other species, and they feed at night. They eat fish, squid, and krill, and forage by surface seizing tactics. Mottled petrels cope with prey limitations better than other breeding procellariforms.

Mottled petrels have a high latitude foraging niche along the edge of the Antarctic pack ice during breeding season. They also tend to go on long foraging trips.

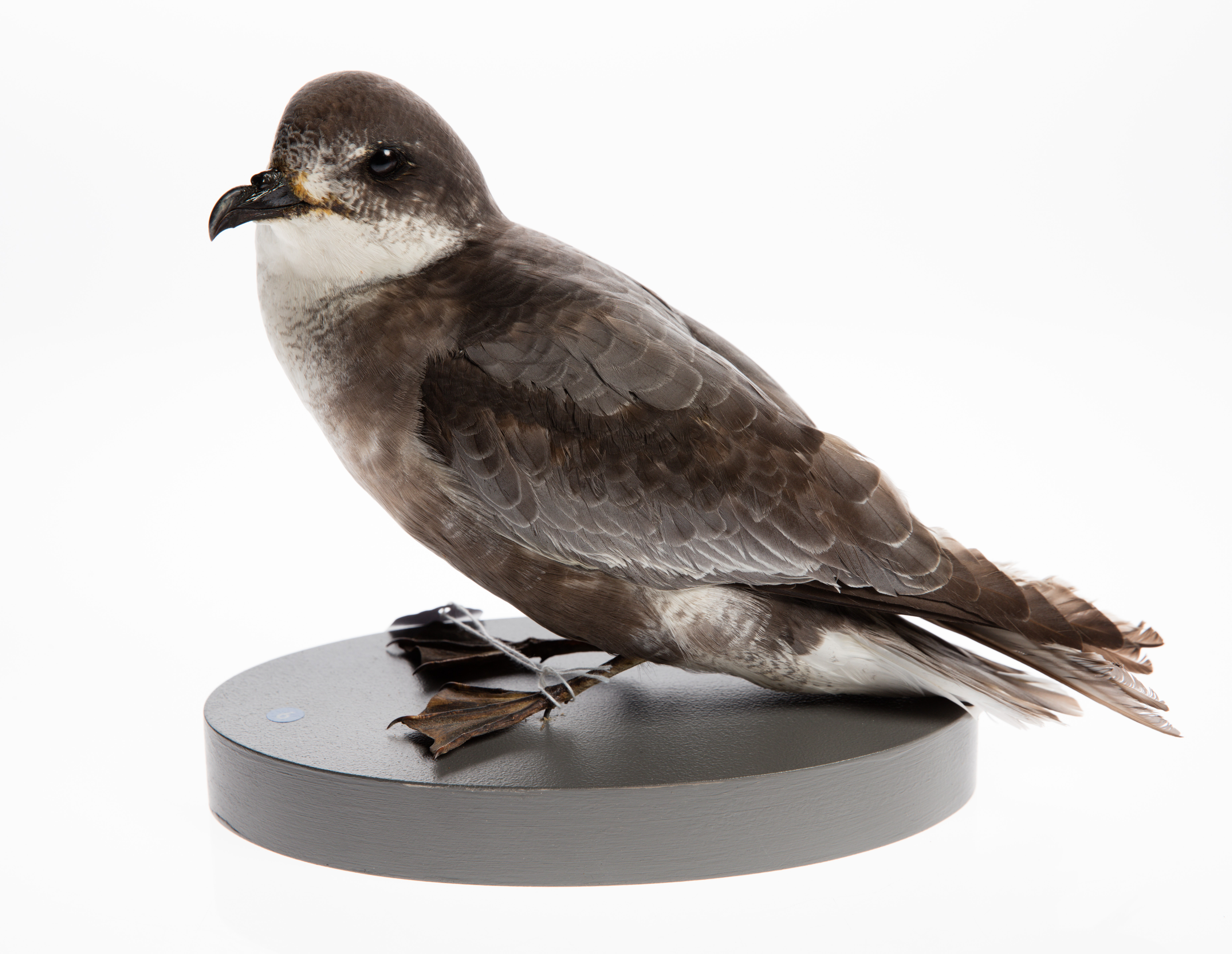
Pterodroma inexpectata, Auckland Museum collection
