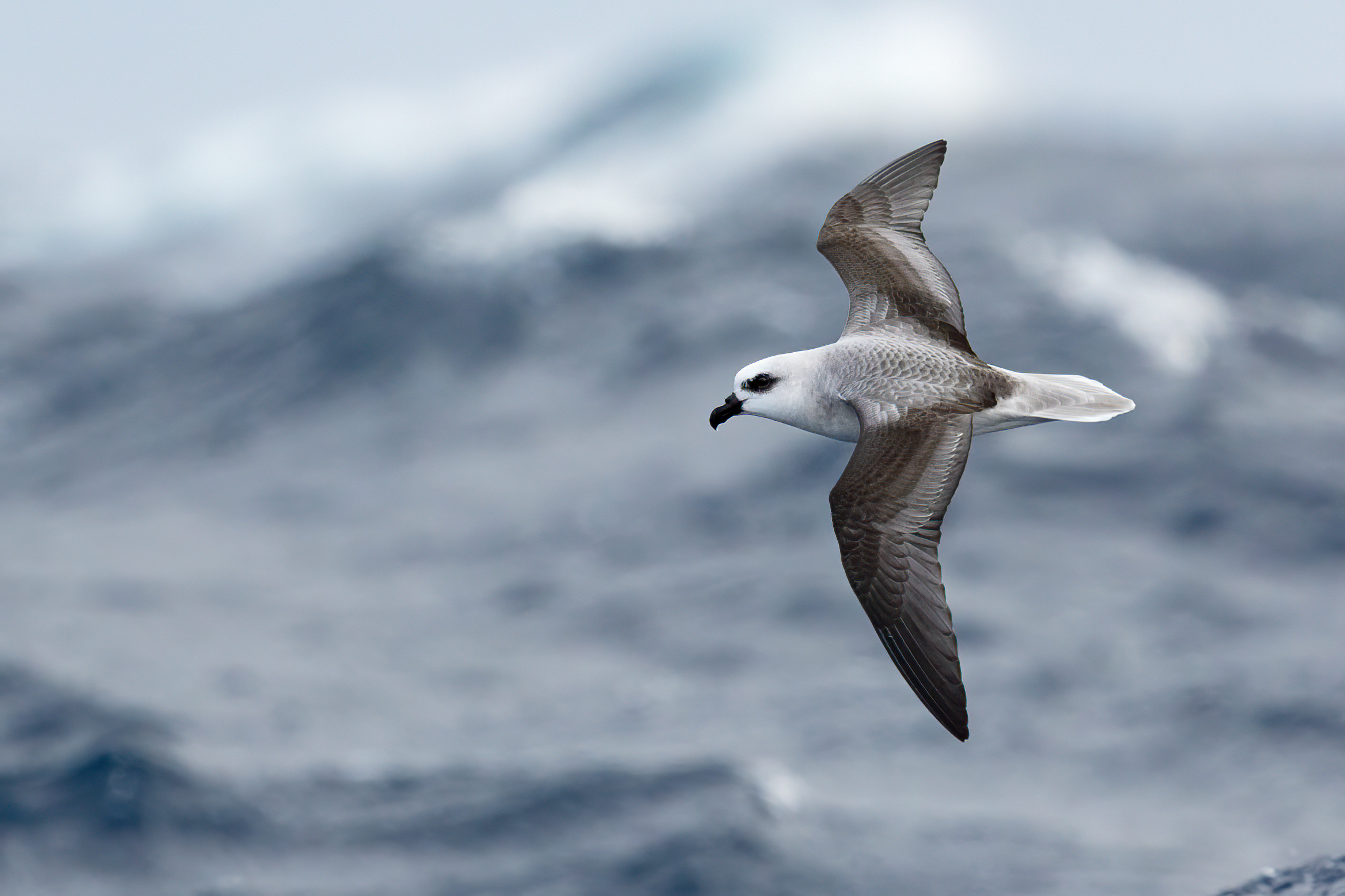
- White-headed Petrel

Scientific classification
- Kingdom: Animalia
- Phylum: Chordata
- Class: Aves
- Order: Procellariiformes
- Family: Procellariidae
- Genus: Pterodroma; Bonaparte, 1856

Type species
- Procellaria macroptera (great-winged petrel) Smith A., 1840

Species
- About 36, see text

= Gadfly petrel =

Gadfly petrels

Genus of birds

The gadfly petrels or Pterodroma are a genus of about 35 species of petrels, part of the seabird order Procellariiformes. The gadfly petrels are named for their speedy weaving flight, as if evading gadflies (horseflies). The flight action is also reflected in the name Pterodroma, from Ancient Greek pteron, "wing" and dromos, "runner".

The short, sturdy bills of these medium to large petrels are adapted for soft prey that they pick from the ocean surface. They have twisted intestines for digesting marine animals that have unusual biochemistries.

Their complex wing and face marking are probably for interspecific recognition.

These birds nest in colonies on islands and are pelagic when not breeding. One white egg is laid usually in a burrow or on open ground. They are nocturnal at the breeding colonies.

While generally wide-ranging, most Pterodroma species are confined to a single ocean basin (e.g. Atlantic), and vagrancy is not as common amongst the genus as in some other seabird species (cf. the storm petrels Hydrobatidae). Eleven species in this genus breed in the New Zealand region, and six of these are only found there.

== Taxonomy ==
The genus Pterodroma was introduced in 1856 by the French naturalist Charles Lucien Bonaparte. The genus name combines the Ancient Greek pteron meaning "wing" with dromos meaning "racer" or "runner". The type species was subsequently designated as the great-winged petrel by the American ornithologist Elliott Coues in 1866.

The species listed here are those recognised in the online list maintained by Frank Gill, Pamela Rasmussen and David Donsker on behalf of the International Ornithological Committee (IOC), also Tennyson et al. 2015. The genus includes 36 species, of which two have become possibly extinct in historical times.

Image	Scientific name	Common name	Distribution
	Pterodroma macroptera	Great-winged petrel	southern Indian and Atlantic oceans
	Pterodroma lessonii	White-headed petrel	subantarctic
	Pterodroma gouldi	Grey-faced petrel	islets off northern New Zealand
	Pterodroma incerta	Atlantic petrel	Gough Island
	Pterodroma solandri	Providence petrel	Lord Howe Island and Phillip Island
	Pterodroma magentae	Magenta petrel	Chatham Islands
	Pterodroma ultima	Murphy's petrel	Polynesia
	Pterodroma mollis	Soft-plumaged petrel	southern Atlantic and Indian oceans to Antipodes Islands
	Pterodroma madeira	Zino's petrel	Madeira
	Pterodroma feae	Cape Verde petrel	Cape Verde
	Pterodroma deserta	Desertas petrel	Madeira
	Pterodroma cahow	Bermuda petrel	Castle Harbour, Bermuda
	Pterodroma hasitata	Black-capped petrel	montane Hispaniola and Dominica
	Pterodroma caribbaea	Jamaican petrel	montane eastern Jamaica
	Pterodroma externa	Juan Fernandez petrel	Alejandro Selkirk Island
	Pterodroma occulta	Vanuatu petrel	Vanua Lava
	Pterodroma neglecta	Kermadec petrel	Pacific Ocean with eccentric breeding in the Indian Ocean on Round Island, Mauritius
	Pterodroma heraldica	Herald petrel	southwest Pacific and Round Island
	Pterodroma arminjoniana	Trindade petrel	Trindade and Martim Vaz and Round Island
	Pterodroma atrata	Henderson petrel	southeast Pacific
	Pterodroma alba	Phoenix petrel	southern Pacific
	Pterodroma baraui	Barau's petrel	Réunion; winters to western Australia
	Pterodroma sandwichensis	Hawaiian petrel	Hawaii
	Pterodroma phaeopygia	Galapagos petrel	Galapagos Islands
	Pterodroma inexpectata	Mottled petrel	southern New Zealand; winters to Bering Sea
	Pterodroma cervicalis	White-necked petrel	Phillip Island (Norfolk Island) and Kermadec Islands; winters southern Pacific
	Pterodroma nigripennis	Black-winged petrel	Round Island and southwest Pacific; winters southern Pacific
	Pterodroma axillaris	Chatham Islands petrel	Rangatira Island
	Pterodroma hypoleuca	Bonin petrel	northwest Pacific
	Pterodroma leucoptera	Gould's petrel	southwest Pacific
	Pterodroma brevipes	Collared petrel	southwest Pacific
	Pterodroma cookii	Cook's petrel	Great & Little Barrier Island, Codfish Island
	Pterodroma defilippiana	Masatierra petrel	Desventuradas Islands and Santa Clara Island
	Pterodroma longirostris	Stejneger's petrel	Alejandro Selkirk Island; winters north Pacific
	Pterodroma pycrofti	Pycroft's petrel	islets off northeastern New Zealand

== See also ==
- List of gadfly petrels
