= List of procellariiformes =

This is a list of the families, species and subspecies of the order Procellariiformes.

The three categories of threatened species from the IUCN Red List

Conservation status - IUCN Red List of Threatened Species:

EX - Extinct, EW - Extinct in the wild
CR - Critically endangered, EN - Endangered, VU - Vulnerable
NT - Near threatened, LC - Least concern
DD - Data deficient, NE - Not evaluated
(v. 2021-3, the data is current as of February 25, 2022)

== Albatrosses ==
Order: Procellariiformes Family: Diomedeidae

The albatrosses are a family of 21 species of large seabird found across the Southern and North Pacific Oceans. The largest are among the largest flying birds in the world.

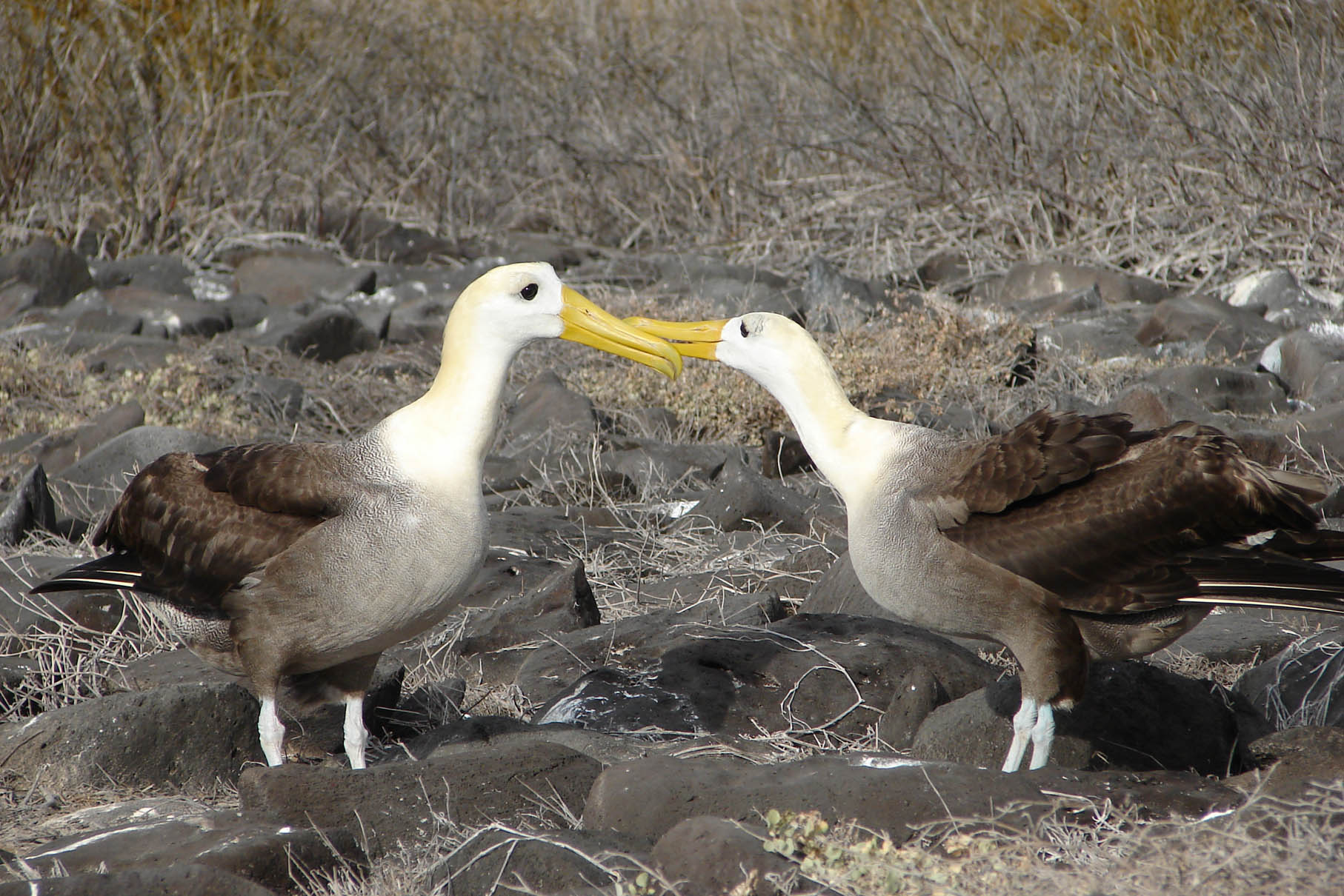
Waved albatross (Phoebastria irrorata) courtship ritual

- Laysan albatross, Phoebastria immutabilis NT
- Black-footed albatross, Phoebastria nigripes NT
- Waved albatross, Phoebastria irrorata CR
- Short-tailed albatross, Phoebastria albatrus VU

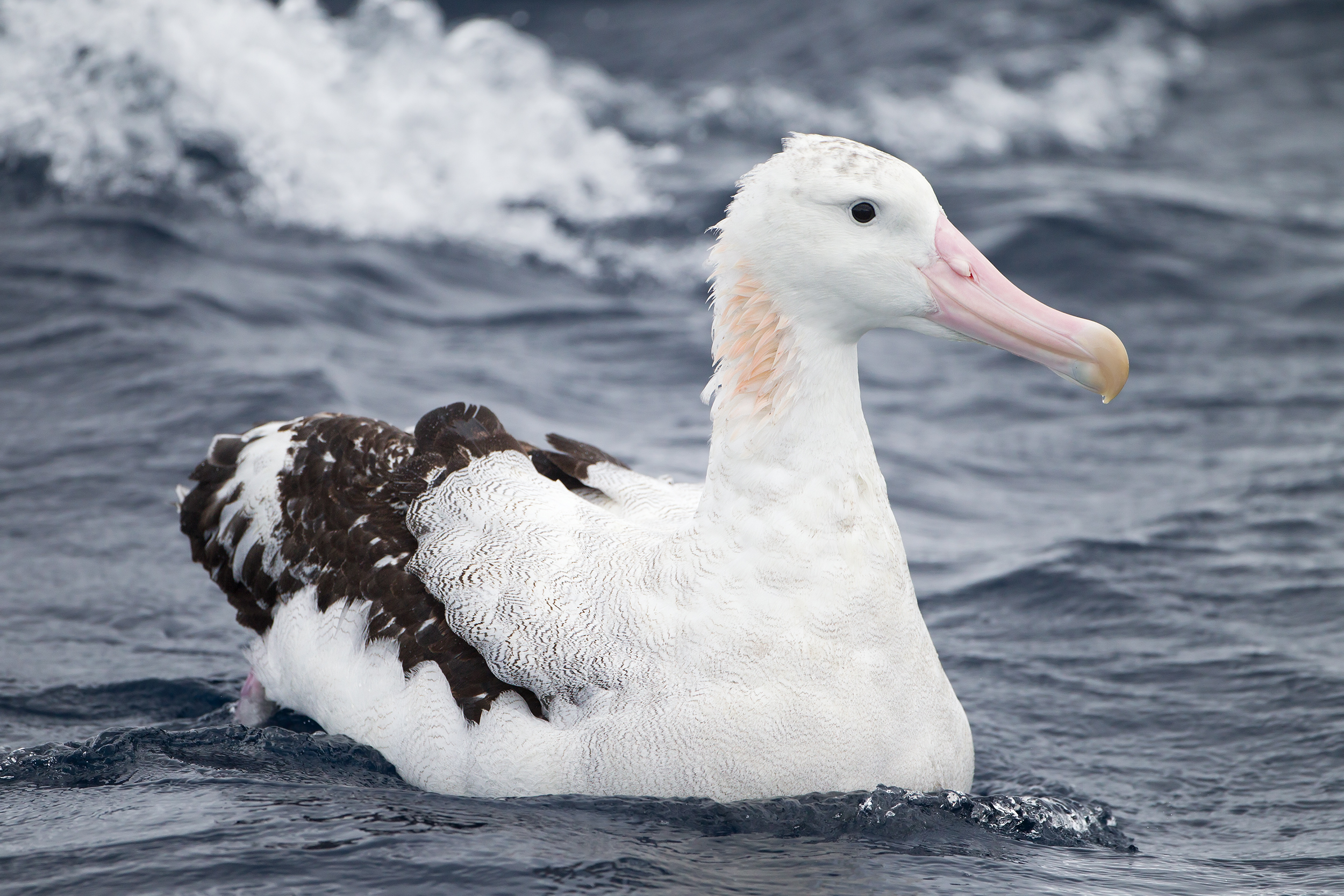
Wandering albatross (Diomedea exulans)

- Wandering albatross, Diomedea exulans VU
- Antipodean albatross, Diomedea antipodensis EN
- Amsterdam albatross, Diomedea amsterdamensis EN
- Southern royal albatross, Diomedea epomophora VU
- Northern royal albatross, Diomedea sanfordi EN
- Tristan albatross, Diomedea dabbenena CR
- Sooty albatross, Phoebetria fusca EN
- Light-mantled albatross, Phoebetria palpebrata NT
- Black-browed albatross, Thalassarche melanophris LC
- Campbell albatross, Thalassarche impavida VU
- Shy albatross, Thalassarche cauta NT
- Chatham albatross, Thalassarche eremita VU
- Salvin's albatross, Thalassarche salvini VU
- Grey-headed albatross, Thalassarche chrysostoma EN
- Atlantic yellow-nosed albatross, Thalassarche chlororhynchos EN
- Indian yellow-nosed albatross, Thalassarche carteri EN
- Buller's albatross, Thalassarche bulleri NT

== Fulmars, petrels, prions and shearwaters ==
Order: Procellariiformes Family: Procellariidae

The procellariids are the main group of medium-sized "true petrels", characterized by united nostrils with medium nasal septum, and a long outer functional primary flight feather.

- Southern giant petrel, Macronectes giganteus LC
- Northern giant petrel, Macronectes halli LC

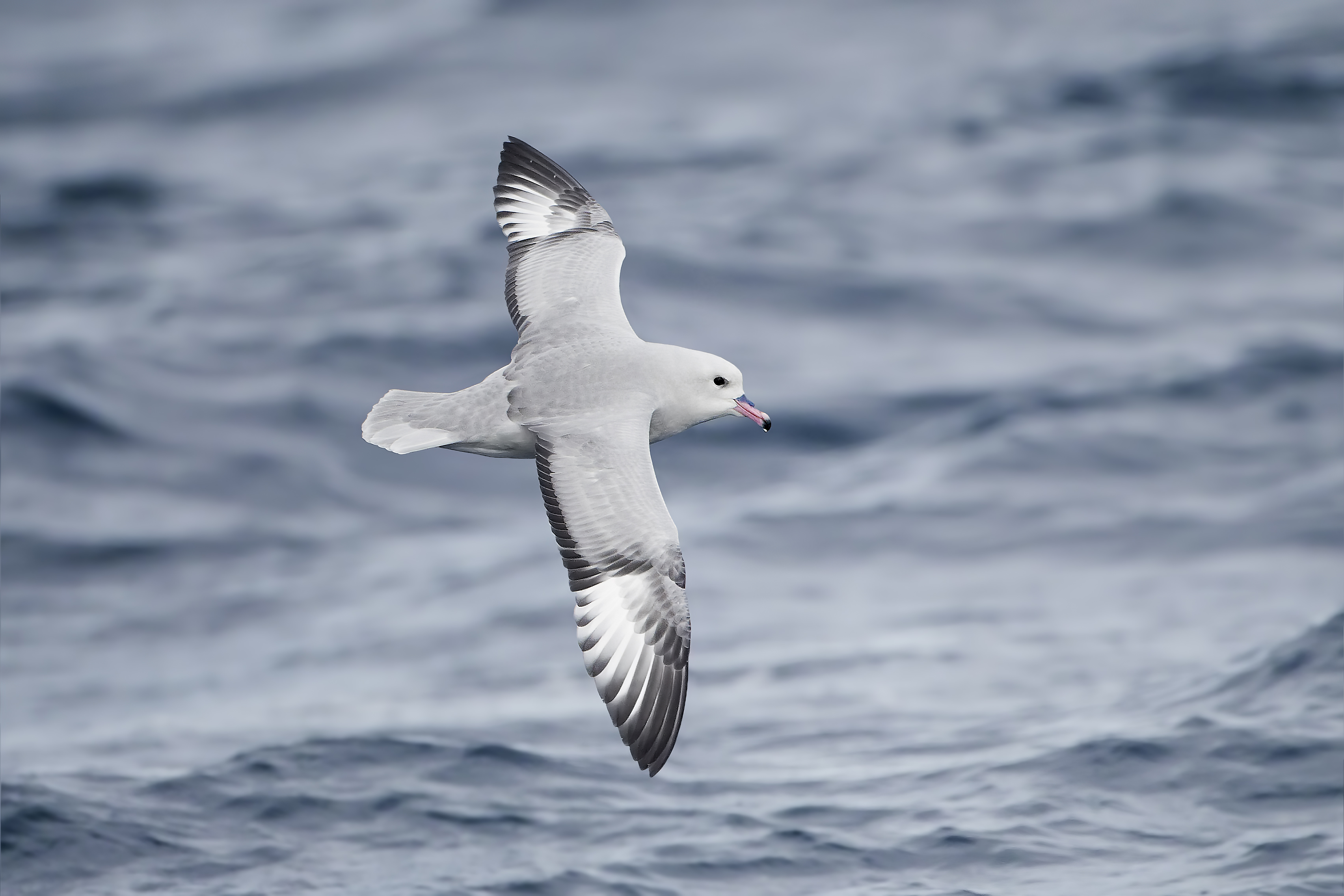
Southern fulmar (Fulmarus glacialoides)

- Northern fulmar, Fulmarus glacialis LC
- Southern fulmar, Fulmarus glacialoides LC
- Antarctic petrel, Thalassoica antarctica LC

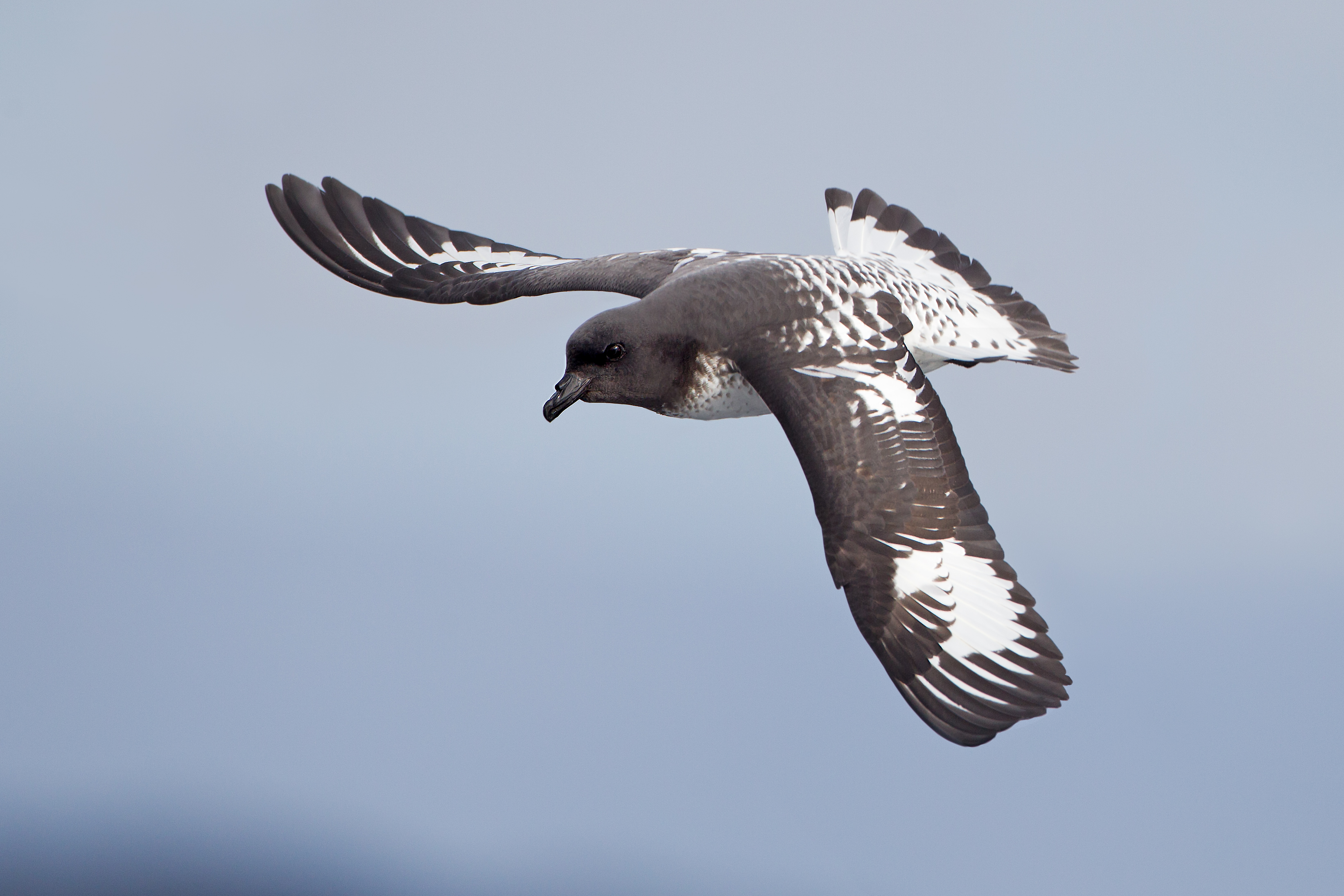
Cape petrel (Daption capense australe)

- Cape petrel, Daption capense LC
- Snow petrel, Pagodroma nivea LC
- Blue petrel, Halobaena caerulea LC

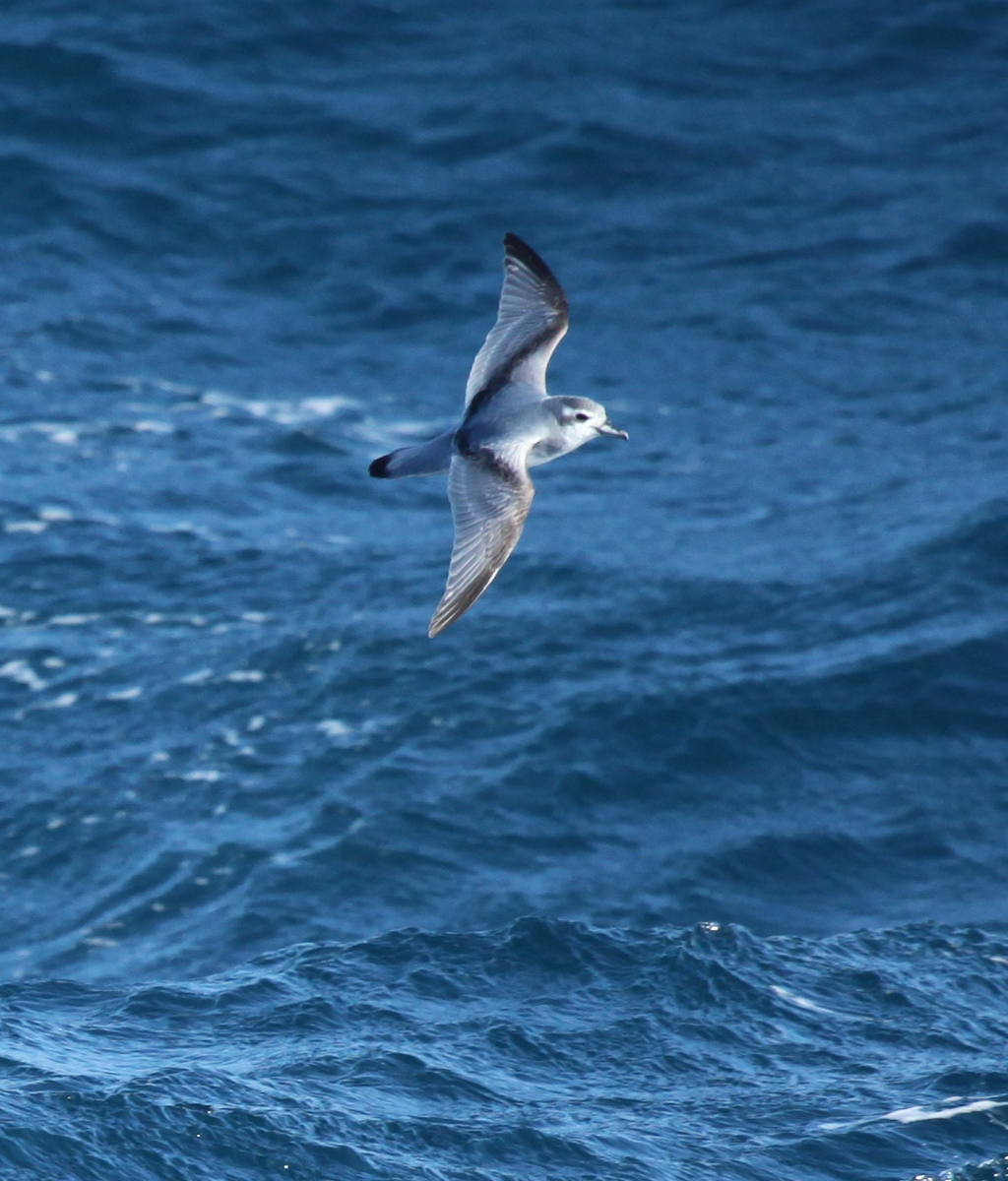
Antarctic prion (Pachyptila desolata)

- Broad-billed prion, Pachyptila vittata LC
- Salvin's prion, Pachyptila salvini LC
- Antarctic prion, Pachyptila desolata LC
- Slender-billed prion, Pachyptila belcheri LC
- Fairy prion, Pachyptila turtur LC
- Fulmar prion, Pachyptila crassirostris LC

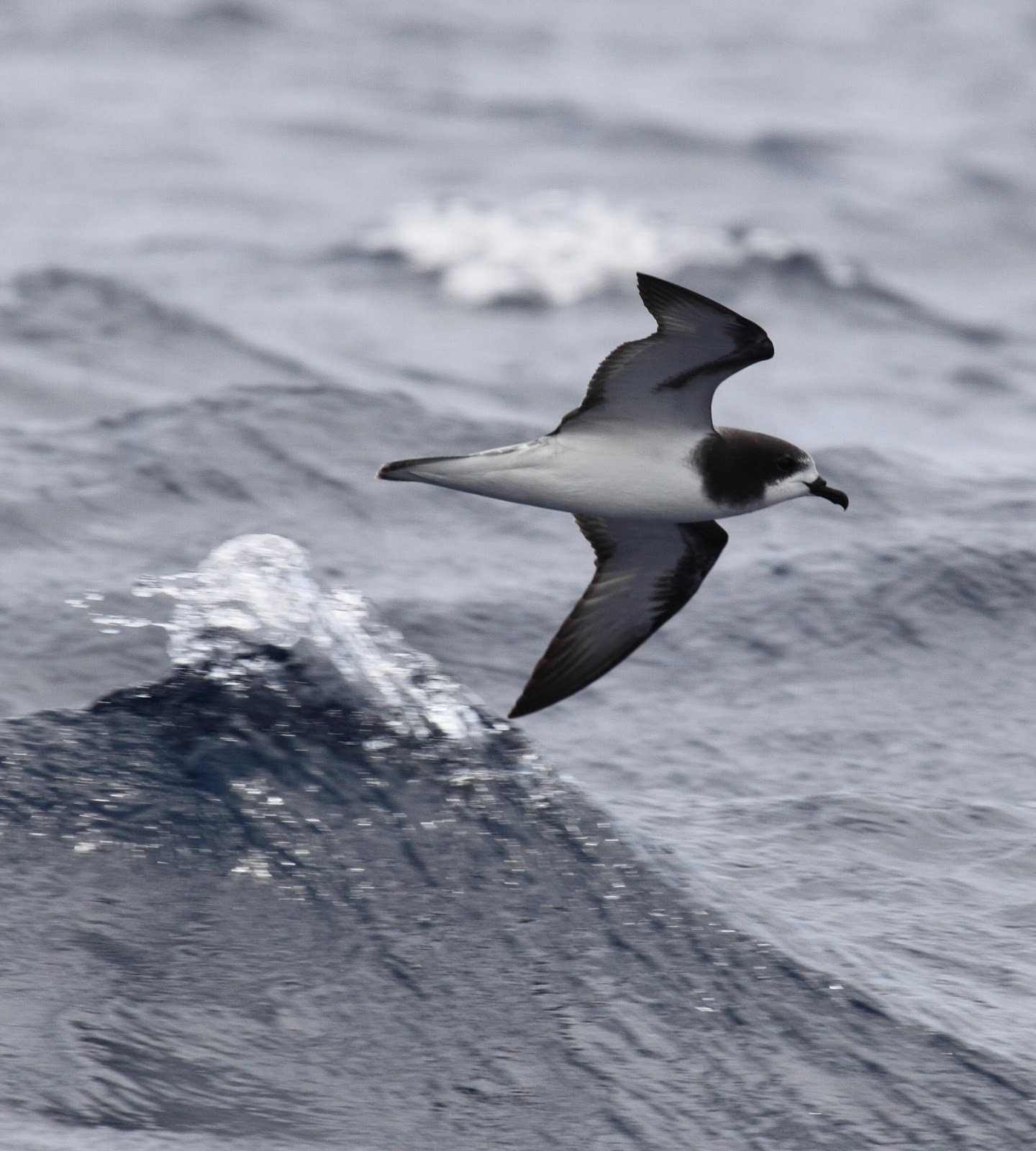
Gould's petrel (Pterodroma leucoptera)

- Kerguelen petrel, Lugensa brevirostris LC
- Great-winged petrel, Pterodroma macroptera LC
- White-headed petrel, Pterodroma lessonii LC
- Atlantic petrel, Pterodroma incerta EN
- Providence petrel, Pterodroma solandri VU
- Magenta petrel, Pterodroma magentae CR
- Murphy's petrel, Pterodroma ultima LC
- Soft-plumaged petrel, Pterodroma mollis LC
- Zino's petrel, Pterodroma madeira EN
- Fea's petrel, Pterodroma feae NT
- Desertas petrel, Pterodroma deserta VU
- Bermuda petrel, Pterodroma cahow EN
- Black-capped petrel, Pterodroma hasitata EN
- Jamaican petrel, Pterodroma caribbaea CR
- Juan Fernandez petrel, Pterodroma externa VU
- Vanuatu petrel, Pterodroma occulta (P. cervicalis: VU)
- Kermadec petrel, Pterodroma neglecta LC
- Herald petrel, Pterodroma heraldica LC
- Trindade petrel, Pterodroma arminjoniana VU
- Henderson petrel, Pterodroma atrata EN
- Phoenix petrel, Pterodroma alba EN
- Barau's petrel, Pterodroma baraui EN
- Hawaiian petrel, Pterodroma sandwichensis EN
- Galapagos petrel, Pterodroma phaeopygia CR
- Mottled petrel, Pterodroma inexpectata NT
- White-necked petrel, Pterodroma cervicalis VU
- Black-winged petrel, Pterodroma nigripennis LC
- Chatham petrel, Pterodroma axillaris VU
- Bonin petrel, Pterodroma hypoleuca LC
- Gould's petrel, Pterodroma leucoptera VU
- Collared petrel, Pterodroma brevipes VU
- Cook's petrel, Pterodroma cookii VU
- Masatierra petrel, Pterodroma defilippiana VU
- Stejneger's petrel, Pterodroma longirostris VU
- Pycroft's petrel, Pterodroma pycrofti VU
- Mascarene petrel, Pseudobulweria aterrima CR
- Saint Helena petrel, Pseudobulweria rupinarum EX

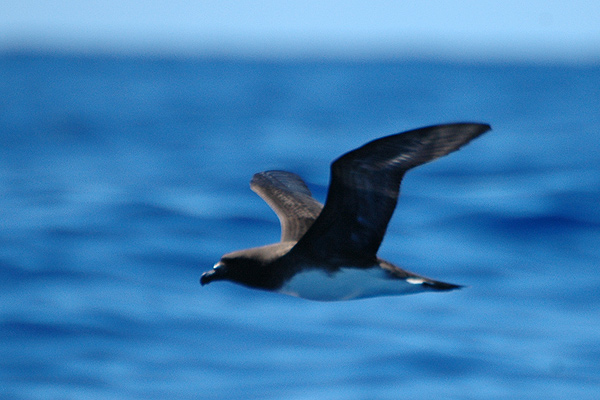
Tahiti petrel (Pseudobulweria rostrata)

- Tahiti petrel, Pseudobulweria rostrata NT
- Beck's petrel, Pseudobulweria becki CR
- Fiji petrel, Pseudobulweria macgillivrayi CR
- Grey petrel, Procellaria cinerea NT
- White-chinned petrel, Procellaria aequinoctialis VU
- Spectacled petrel, Procellaria conspicillata VU
- Black petrel, Procellaria parkinsoni VU
- Westland petrel, Procellaria westlandica EN

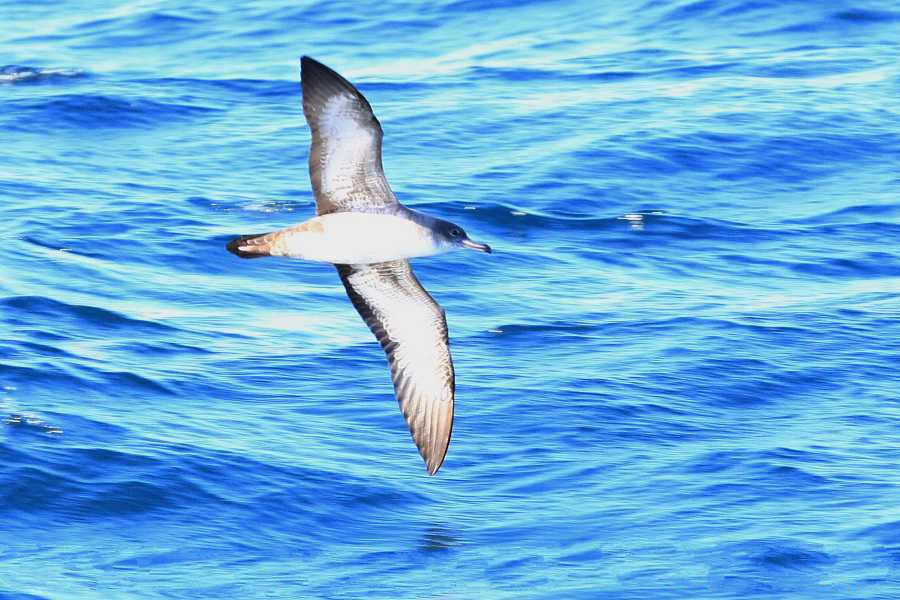
Pink-footed shearwater (Puffinus creatopus)

- Streaked shearwater, Calonectris leucomelas NT
- Scopoli's shearwater, Calonectris (diomedea) diomedea (C. diomedea including C. (d.) borealis and C. (d.) diomedea: LC)
- Cory's shearwater, Calonectris (diomedea) borealis (C. diomedea including C. (d.) borealis and C. (d.) diomedea: LC)
- Cape Verde shearwater, Calonectris edwardsii NT
- Wedge-tailed shearwater, Puffinus pacificus LC
- Buller's shearwater, Puffinus bulleri VU
- Sooty shearwater, Puffinus griseus NT
- Short-tailed shearwater, Puffinus tenuirostris LC
- Pink-footed shearwater, Puffinus creatopus VU
- Flesh-footed shearwater, Puffinus carneipes NT
- Great shearwater, Puffinus gravis LC
- Christmas shearwater, Puffinus nativitatis LC
- Manx shearwater, Puffinus puffinus LC
- Yelkouan shearwater, Puffinus yelkouan VU
- Balearic shearwater, Puffinus mauretanicus CR
- Bryan's shearwater, Puffinus bryani CR
- Black-vented shearwater, Puffinus opisthomelas NT
- Townsend's shearwater, Puffinus auricularis CR
- Newell's shearwater, Puffinus newelli CR
- Rapa shearwater, Puffinus myrtae CR
- Fluttering shearwater, Puffinus gavia LC
- Hutton's shearwater, Puffinus huttoni EN
- Sargasso shearwater, Puffinus lherminieri LC
- Persian shearwater, Puffinus persicus LC
- Tropical shearwater, Puffinus bailloni LC
- Galapagos shearwater, Puffinus subalaris LC
- Heinroth's shearwater, Puffinus heinrothi VU
- Little shearwater, Puffinus assimilis LC
- Boyd's shearwater, Puffinus boydi NE (P. assimilis: LC, P. lherminieri: LC)
- Bulwer's petrel, Bulweria bulwerii LC
- Olson's petrel, Bulweria bifax EX
- Jouanin's petrel, Bulweria fallax NT

== Storm petrels ==
Order: Procellariiformes Family: Hydrobatidae

The storm-petrels are the smallest seabirds, relatives of the petrels, feeding on planktonic crustaceans and small fish picked from the surface, typically while hovering. Their flight is fluttering and sometimes bat-like.

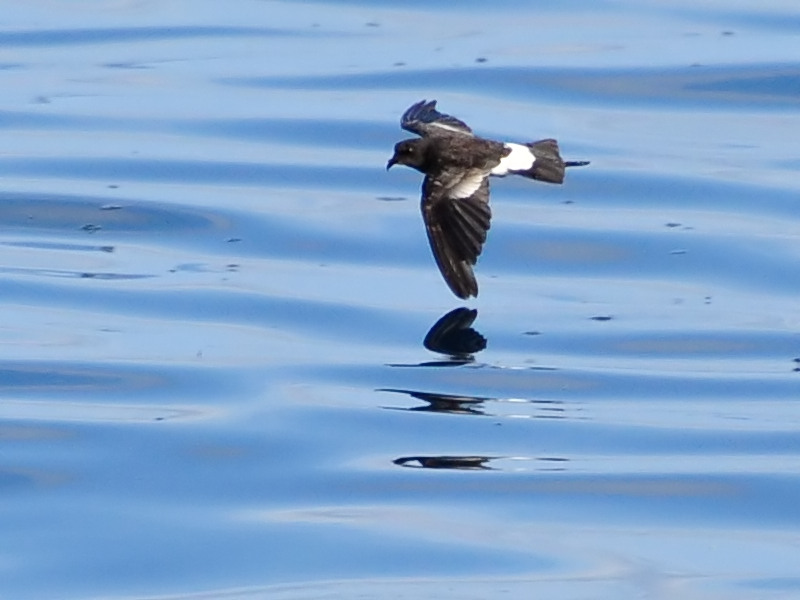
Wilson's storm petrel (Oceanites oceanicus)

- Wilson's storm petrel, Oceanites oceanicus LC
- Elliot's storm petrel, Oceanites gracilis DD
- Grey-backed storm petrel, Garrodia nereis LC
- White-faced storm petrel, Pelagodroma marina LC
- White-bellied storm petrel, Fregetta grallaria LC
- Black-bellied storm petrel, Fregetta tropica LC
- New Zealand storm petrel, Fregetta maorianus CR
- Polynesian storm petrel, Nesofregetta fuliginosa EN
- European storm petrel, Hydrobates pelagicus LC
- Least storm petrel, Hydrobates microsoma LC
- Wedge-rumped storm petrel, Hydrobates tethys LC
- Band-rumped storm petrel, Hydrobates castro LC
- Monteiro's storm petrel, Hydrobates monteiroi VU
- Cape Verde storm petrel, Hydrobates jabejabe LC
- Swinhoe's storm petrel, Hydrobates monorhis NT
- Leach's storm petrel, Hydrobates leucorhoa VU
- Markham's storm petrel, Hydrobates markhami NT
- Tristram's storm petrel, Hydrobates tristrami LC
- Black storm petrel, Hydrobates melania LC
- Guadalupe storm petrel, Hydrobates macrodactyla CR
- Matsudaira's storm petrel, Hydrobates matsudairae VU
- Ashy storm petrel, Hydrobates homochroa EN
- Ringed storm petrel, Hydrobates hornbyi NT
- Fork-tailed storm petrel, Hydrobates furcata LC

== Diving petrels ==
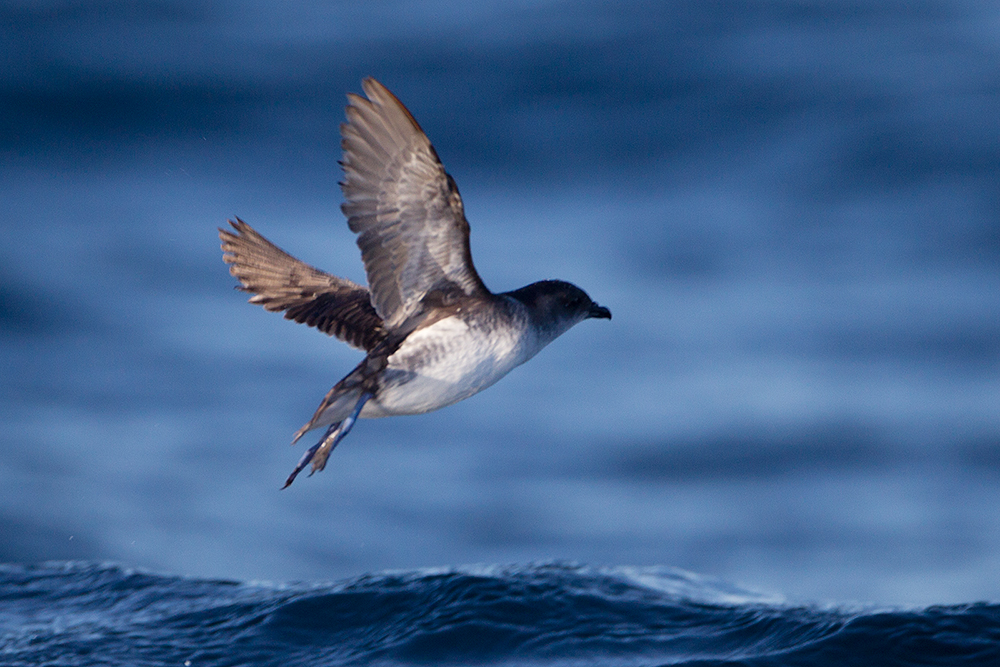
Common diving petrel (Pelecanoides urinatrix)

Order: Procellariiformes Family: Pelecanoididae

The diving-petrels are relatives of the petrels distinguishable only by small differences in plumage and bill construction. They feed on plankton by pursuit diving.

- Peruvian diving petrel, Pelecanoides garnotii NT
- Magellanic diving petrel, Pelecanoides magellani LC
- South Georgia diving petrel, Pelecanoides georgicus LC
- Common diving petrel, Pelecanoides urinatrix LC

== Bibliography ==
- "Loons, penguins, & petrels". IOC World Bird List Version 3.3. International Ornithologists' Union. Archived from the original on 2013-04-13.
