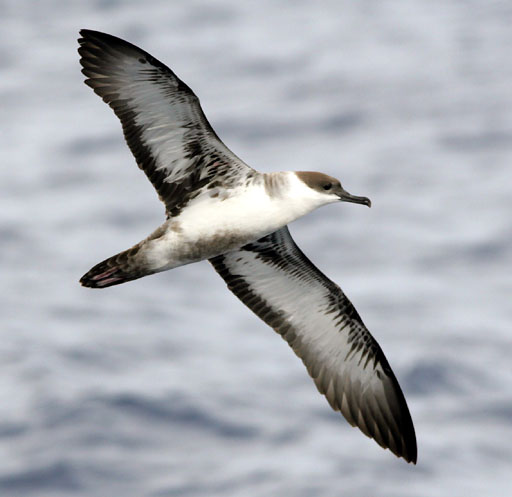
- Great shearwater

Scientific classification
- Kingdom: Animalia
- Phylum: Chordata
- Class: Aves
- Order: Procellariiformes
- Family: Procellariidae

Diversity
- 3 genera and c. 30 species

Genera
- Calonectris; Puffinus; Ardenna

= Shearwater =

Shearwaters

Seabird

Shearwaters are medium-sized long-winged seabirds in the petrel family Procellariidae. They have a global marine distribution, but are most common in temperate and cold waters, and are pelagic outside the breeding season.

== Description ==
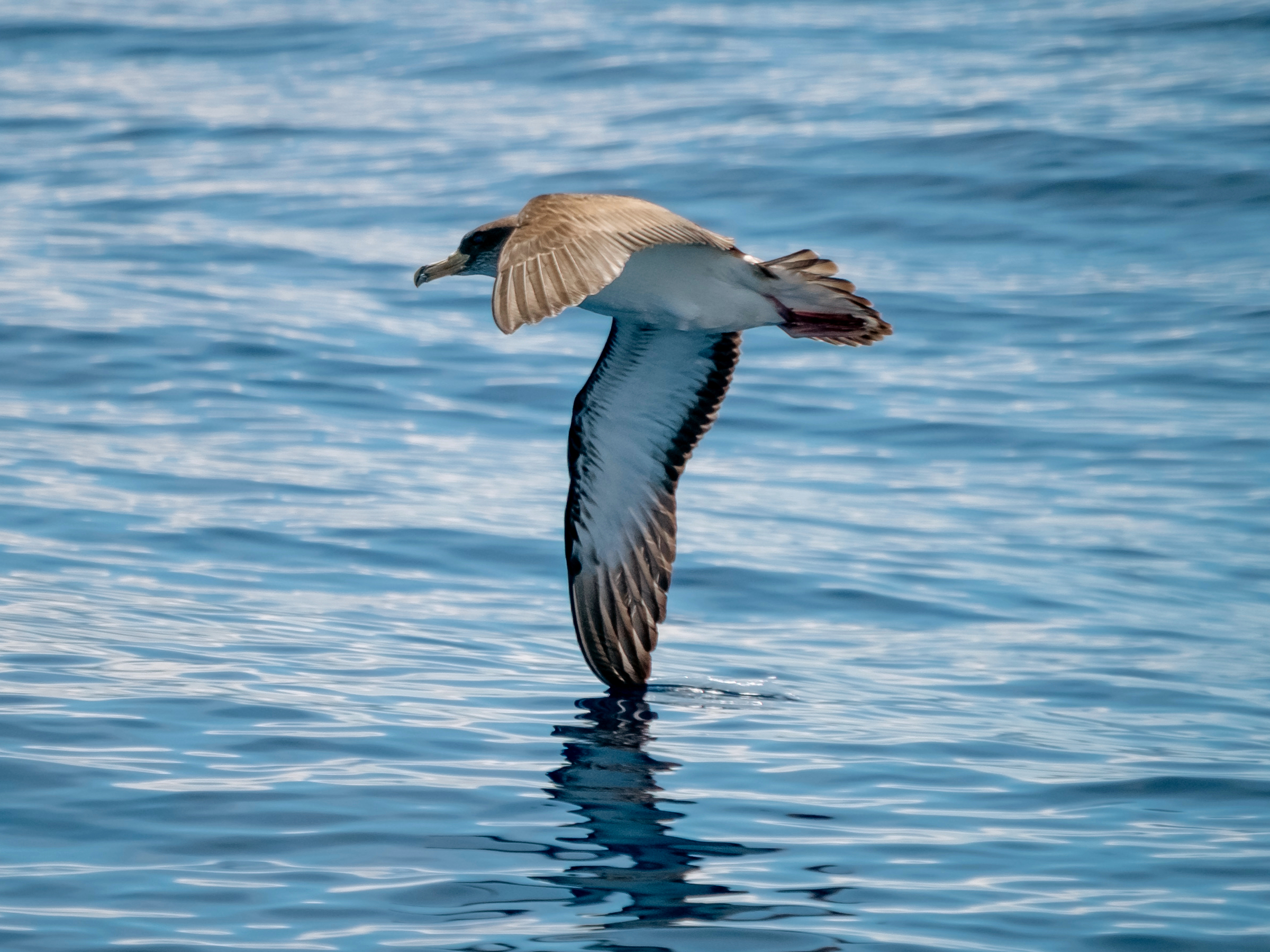
Cory's shearwater in flight, showing the wingtip 'shearing' the sea surface

These tubenose birds fly with stiff wings and use a "shearing" flight technique (flying very close to the water and seemingly or actually cutting or "shearing" the waves with the tips of their wings) to move across wave fronts with the minimum of active flight. This technique gives the group its English name. Some small species like the Manx shearwater are cruciform in flight, with their long wings held directly out from their bodies. They range in size from 25 to 56 cm (9.8 to 22.0 in) long with wingspans from 58 to 125 cm (23 to 49 in), and weights of 150 to 1,000 g (5.3 to 35.3 oz). Many are black above and white below, or brown above and pale or dusky below, while some are more-or-less uniformly dark brown all over; one (Buller's shearwater) is distinct in being patterned pale grey and black above. All are evolved for swimming, and have short legs and webbed feet; they can only shuffle awkwardly on land, so visit their breeding sites on remote islands under cover of darkness. They differ from other petrels in having a slender build and particularly, relatively long and slender bills.

== Taxonomy ==
A total of 31 species are currently accepted, with four large species in the genus Calonectris, seven medium-size to large species in the genus Ardenna, and 20 smaller species in the genus Puffinus. Recent genomic studies show that shearwaters form a monophyletic clade within the family Procellariidae, sister to a group of petrels in the genera Procellaria, Bulweria and Pseudobulweria. This arrangement contrasts with earlier conceptions based on mitochondrial DNA sequencing.

=== List of species ===
The group contains 3 genera with 31 species:

- Calonectris
  - Streaked shearwater Calonectris leucomelas
  - Cape Verde shearwater Calonectris edwardsii (split from Cory's shearwater)
  - Scopoli's shearwater Calonectris diomedea (split from Cory's shearwater)
  - Cory's shearwater Calonectris diomedea
- Ardenna
  - Wedge-tailed shearwater Ardenna pacifica
  - Buller's shearwater Ardenna bulleri
  - Short-tailed shearwater Ardenna tenuirostris
  - Sooty shearwater Ardenna grisea
  - Great shearwater Ardenna gravis
  - Flesh-footed shearwater Ardenna carneipes
  - Pink-footed shearwater Ardenna creatopus
- Puffinus
  - Christmas shearwater Puffinus nativitatis
  - Galápagos shearwater Puffinus subalaris (split from Audubon's shearwater)
  - Fluttering shearwater Puffinus gavia
  - Hutton's shearwater Puffinus huttoni
  - Manx shearwater Puffinus puffinus
  - Mediterranean shearwater Puffinus yelkouan (includes Balearic shearwater P. y. mauretanicus, formerly considered a separate species)
  - Sargasso shearwater (formerly Audubon's shearwater, before splitting) Puffinus lherminieri
  - Barolo shearwater or Macronesian shearwater Puffinus baroli (split from little shearwater)
  - Boyd's shearwater Puffinus boydi (split first from little shearwater, and then later from Barolo shearwater)
  - Heinroth's shearwater Puffinus heinrothi
  - Subantarctic shearwater Puffinus elegans (split from little shearwater)
  - Little shearwater Puffinus assimilis
  - Bryan's shearwater Puffinus bryani – first described in 2011
  - Persian shearwater Puffinus persicus (split from Audubon's shearwater)
  - Tropical shearwater Puffinus bailloni (split from Audubon's shearwater)
  - Black-vented shearwater Puffinus opisthomelas
  - Bannerman's shearwater Puffinus bannermani
  - Rapa shearwater Puffinus myrtae (split from Newell's shearwater)
  - Townsend's shearwater Puffinus auricularis
  - Newell's shearwater Puffinus newelli (split from Townsend's shearwater)

There are two extinct species that have been described from fossils.

- † Lava shearwater or Olson's shearwater Puffinus olsoni
- † Dune shearwater or Hole's shearwater Puffinus holeae

=== Phylogeny ===
Phylogeny of the shearwaters based on a study by Joan Ferrer Obiol and collaborators published in 2022. Only 14 of the 20 recognised species in the genus Puffinus were included.

- - Puffinus
    - Christmas shearwater Puffinus nativitatis
    - - - Fluttering shearwater Puffinus gavia
        - Hutton's shearwater Puffinus huttoni
      - - - - Audubon's shearwater Puffinus lherminieri
            - - Barolo shearwater Puffinus baroli
              - Boyd's shearwater Puffinus boydi
          - - Manx shearwater Puffinus puffinus
            - - Balearic shearwater Puffinus mauretanicus
              - Yelkouan shearwater Puffinus yelkouan
        - - - Little shearwater Puffinus assimilis
            - Subantarctic shearwater Puffinus elegans
          - - Tropical shearwater Puffinus bailloni
            - - Black-vented shearwater Puffinus opisthomelas
              - Newell's shearwater Puffinus newelli
  - - Calonectris
      - Streaked shearwater Calonectris leucomelas
      - - Cape Verde shearwater Calonectris edwardsii
        - - Cory's shearwater Calonectris borealis
          - Scopoli's shearwater Calonectris diomedea
    - Ardenna
      - - Buller's shearwater Ardenna bulleri
        - Wedge-tailed shearwater Ardenna pacifica
      - - Short-tailed shearwater Ardenna tenuirostris
        - - Sooty shearwater Ardenna grisea
          - - Great shearwater Ardenna gravis
            - - Flesh-footed shearwater Ardenna carneipes
              - Pink-footed shearwater Ardenna creatopus

== Behaviour ==
=== Movements ===
Many shearwaters are long-distance migrants, perhaps most spectacularly sooty shearwaters, which cover distances in excess of 14,000 km (8,700 mi) from their breeding colonies on the Falkland Islands (52°S 60°W) to as far as 70° north latitude in the North Atlantic Ocean off northern Norway, and around New Zealand to as far as 60° north latitude in the North Pacific Ocean off Alaska. A 2006 study found individual tagged sooty shearwaters from New Zealand migrating 64,000 km (40,000 mi) a year, which gave them the then longest known animal migration ever recorded electronically (though subsequently greatly exceeded by a tagged arctic tern migrating 96,000 km (60,000 mi)). Short-tailed shearwaters perform an even longer "figure of eight" loop migration in the Pacific Ocean from Tasmania to as far north as the Arctic Ocean off northwest Alaska. They are also long-lived: a Manx shearwater breeding on Copeland Island, Northern Ireland, was (as of 2003/2004) the oldest known wild bird in the world; ringed as an adult (when at least 5 years old) in July 1953, it was retrapped in July 2003, at least 55 years old (also now exceeded, by a Laysan albatross). Manx shearwaters migrate over 10,000 km (6,200 mi) to South America in winter, using waters off southern Brazil and Argentina, so this bird had covered a minimum of 1,000,000 km (620,000 mi) on migration alone.

Following the tracks of the migratory Yelkouan shearwater has revealed that this species never flies overland, even if it means flying an extra 1,000 km. For instance, during their seasonal migration towards the Black Sea they would circumvent the entire Peloponnese instead of crossing over the 6 km Isthmus of Corinth.

=== Breeding ===
Shearwaters come to islands and coastal cliffs only to breed. They are nocturnal at the colonial breeding sites, preferring moonless nights to minimize predation. They nest in burrows and often give eerie contact calls on their night-time visits. They lay a single white egg. The chicks of some species, notably short-tailed and sooty shearwaters, are subject to harvesting from their nest burrows for food, a practice known as muttonbirding, in Australia and New Zealand.

=== Feeding ===
Shearwaters feed on fish, squid, and similar oceanic food. Some will follow fishing boats to take scraps, commonly the sooty shearwater; these species also commonly follow whales to feed on fish disturbed by them. Their primary feeding technique is diving, with some species diving to depths of 70 m (230 ft). Shearwaters defecate more often than other seabirds, typically between once every four to ten minutes. They excrete five percent of their body mass every hour, generally done while flying, rather than while resting on water.
