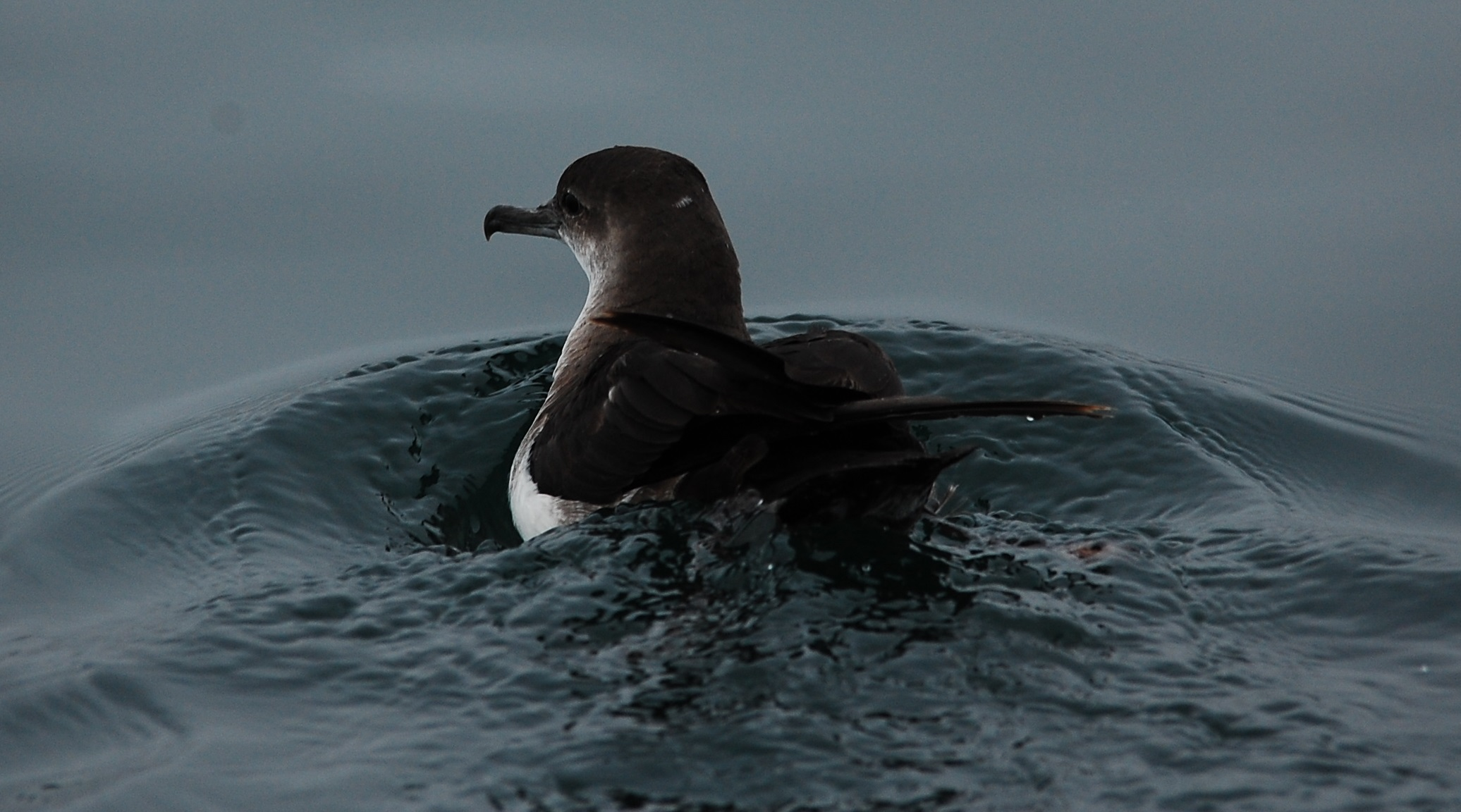

Conservation status
- Near Threatened (IUCN 3.1)

Scientific classification
- Kingdom: Animalia
- Phylum: Chordata
- Class: Aves
- Order: Procellariiformes
- Family: Procellariidae
- Genus: Puffinus
- Species: P. opisthomelas

Binomial name
- Puffinus opisthomelas Coues, 1864

= Black-vented shearwater =

Species of bird

The black-vented shearwater (Puffinus opisthomelas) is a species of seabird endemic to islands off of the Pacific coast of Mexico and the Gulf of California. It is a smaller shearwater, with a length of 30–38 cm, 76–89 cm wingspan and a mass of around 400 g. This species is pelagic and feeds mainly on small fish. It is nocturnal, and is most active in low light settings.

== Taxonomy and Origins ==
The name "puffin" is thought to originate from the Middle English term "pophyn," which was used in the Middle Ages to describe the fatty, preserved young shearwaters that were prepared as food. Since shearwaters and Atlantic puffins (Fratercula arctica) often nest in close proximity, the name 'puffin' was mistakenly applied to the Atlantic puffin. Over time, the name stuck, and today it is used for the Atlantic puffin species. The name "puffin" also remained associated with the shearwaters and the genus Puffinus.

The black-vented shearwater is one of around 21 other species in the genus Puffinus, eight of which reside in North and Middle America (see Christmas shearwater, Galápagos shearwater, Manx shearwater, Townsend's shearwater, Newell's shearwater, Bryan's shearwater, Sargasso shearwater and Barolo shearwater). Previously considered a subspecies of the Manx shearwater (Puffinus puffinus), the black-vented shearwater was officially deemed a species in 1983 by the American Ornithologists Union . It is considered a monotypic species and it currently has no recognised subspecies.

== Identification ==
Black-vented shearwater adults are around 30–38 cm in length, have a 76–89 cm wingspan and weigh around 400 g. Males are generally slightly larger than females, though the size difference is minimal.

=== Plumage ===
Chicks have grey down feathers, lighter around their throat and breast areas. These down feathers lighten slightly over time. Adults have dark brown heads, and dorsal plumages, with lighter ventral plumage (often white with specks and smudges of brown). This is like many other diving and marine bird species, which use countershading as a method of camouflage. Juvenile plumage is similar to adult plumage, however often darker and more contrasted compared to more worn adult plumages. This species is not sexually dimorphic, so plumage does not vary between sexes.

=== Moulting ===
Individuals have their first moult during the breeding season. It is theorized that this moult, which reduces wing surface area, may enhance diving efficiency. Since these birds forage much closer to shore than other pelagic birds, they do not need to have as effective wings for flight. This moult may also serve to increase dive efficiency during the chick-rearing period.

== Habitat and Distribution ==
This species is pelagic, occurring in the Pacific Ocean and the Gulf of California. It comes closer to land than most other shearwaters It nests predominantly on offshore islands off north and western Baja California, Mexico, namely Isla Natividad (95% of the nesting population), Isla de Guadalupe, and Islas San Benito. It is relatively common along the central and southern California coast during the colder months. The species has recently been observed nesting on Isla Rasa and Isla Partida in the Gulf of California, showing an expansion to their previously known breeding range. Black-vented shearwaters have been spotted as far north as British Columbia, but it is considered an "accidental visitor".

Black-vented shearwaters prefer warmer waters, reportedly greater than 14 °C, but the species is relatively plastic in terms of habitat choice and foraging strategies. The species primarily inhabits waters over the continental shelf. Near breeding colonies, the sea floor drops off significantly as one moves farther from the coast, and some individuals are believed to forage in waters that reach depths of over 2 kilometers.

This species does not migrate far and tends to stay relatively close to its breeding colonies year-round.

== Behaviour and Ecology ==
Black-vented shearwaters are nocturnal, with activity levels influenced by ambient light. This is theorized to be a strategy to avoid predation by diurnal predators such as the Western Gull (Larus occidentalis), as they experience the highest predation rates during daylight hours.

=== Vocalizations ===
Although there are few records of black-vented shearwater calls, their vocalizations have been likened to a moaning growl, similar to the sound of a dentist's drill and suction. The black-vented shearwater only calls at night, when there is little to no moon. Vocalizations are believed to play a significant role in mating, as the species lacks sexual dimorphism, akin to the Manx shearwater.

=== Diet and Foraging ===
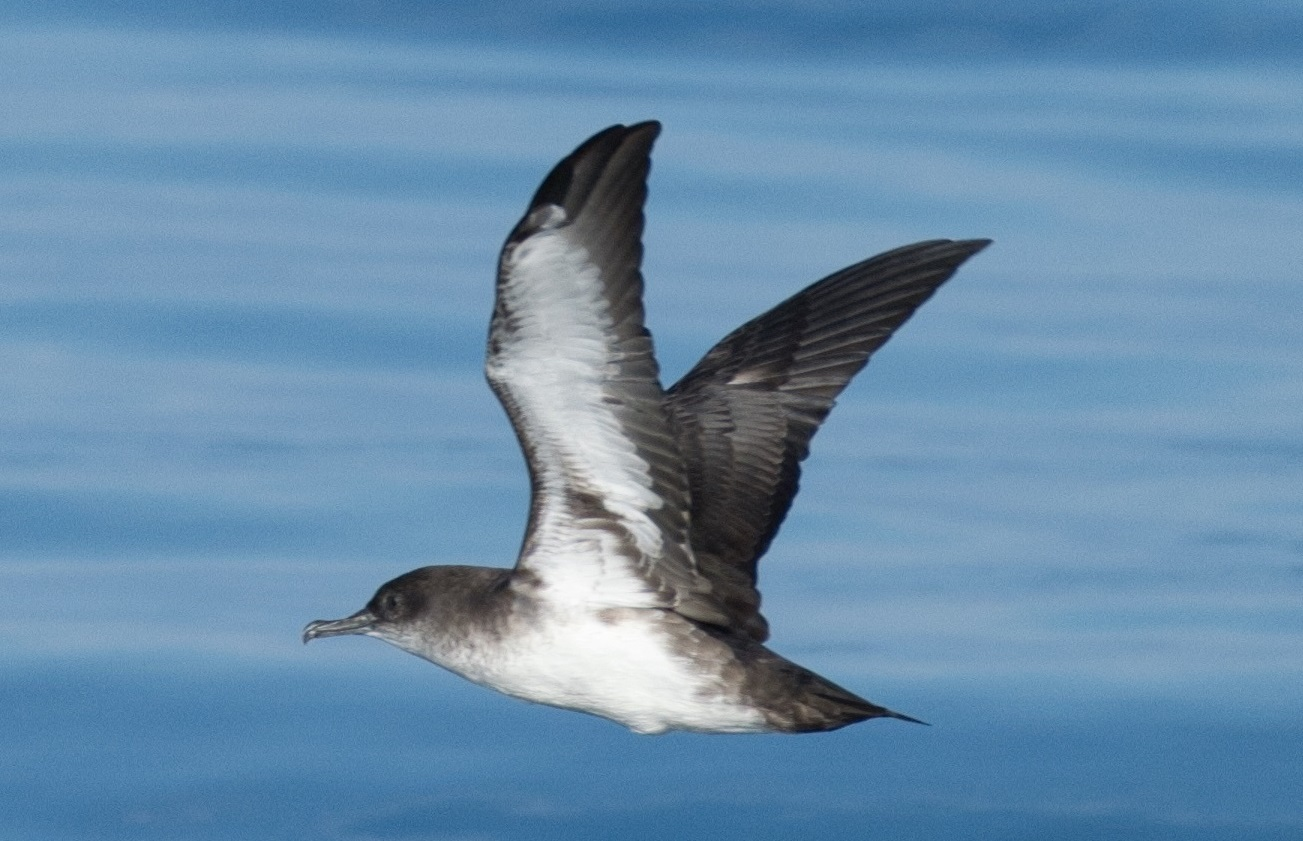
A black-vented shearwater flying over the water.

The black-vented shearwater is thought to feed mainly on small fish. Individuals have been recorded eating sardines, herring, anchovies and Mastegoteuthid squid. They are not attracted to chum, and don't tend to follow ships for food live some other marine avian species.

Black-vented shearwaters forage closer to shore than many other pelagic bird species and tend to avoid extended foraging trips. Like other species in the Puffinus genus, black-vented shearwaters are free-divers. They are the best performing free-diver in the Puffinus genus, with a maximum dive duration of 88 seconds and maximum depth of 52 meters. These birds were also recorded diving deeper when foraging during their breeding season.

=== Reproduction ===
Black-vented shearwaters are colonial nesters. Although colony sizes have not been accurately estimated to date, about 95% of their breeding population has historically been found on Isla Natividad.

During breeding, black-vented shearwaters construct burrows that they maintain throughout the breeding season. It is uncertain when they form burrows, but studies suggest that it is between late November and January. These burrows tend to be formed in sandy soil in areas with low vegetation. On San Benito Island, shearwaters often form nests in pre-existing rock crevices. This species also uses artificial burrows when available.

Clutches usually have one egg. Occasionally 2 eggs have been found in nests, likely because of egg-dumping from another female or one of the eggs is from a previous season. Both parents spend roughly equal time incubating the egg. Incubation shifts lasts between three and five days on average. The total incubation period is around 49 days.

Chicks that hatch are altricial and unable to thermoregulate, and hence require significant parental care.

== Status and Conservation ==
Historically, this species faced threats from feral cats and other predators on its breeding islands; however, these issues appear to have been largely resolved. There is some loss of birds from commercial gill netting, and the species is classified as near threatened by the IUCN mainly due to the uncertain impact on it by the expanding fishing industry.

All islands where they breed have permanent human inhabitants, and anthropogenic presence has consequently led to a decrease in their habitat size. On Isla Natividad, development has significantly impacted nesting habitats. The town and associated infrastructure have led to the loss of an estimated 26,532 burrows, about 15% of the total colony. Their expanded territory to other areas like Isla Rasa and other islands in the Gulf of California bodes well for this species' future conservation.
