= West of il-Ħaġra s-Sewda to ix-Xaqqa Cliffs Important Bird Area =

Conservation area in Malta

Coordinates: 35°50′N 14°25′E

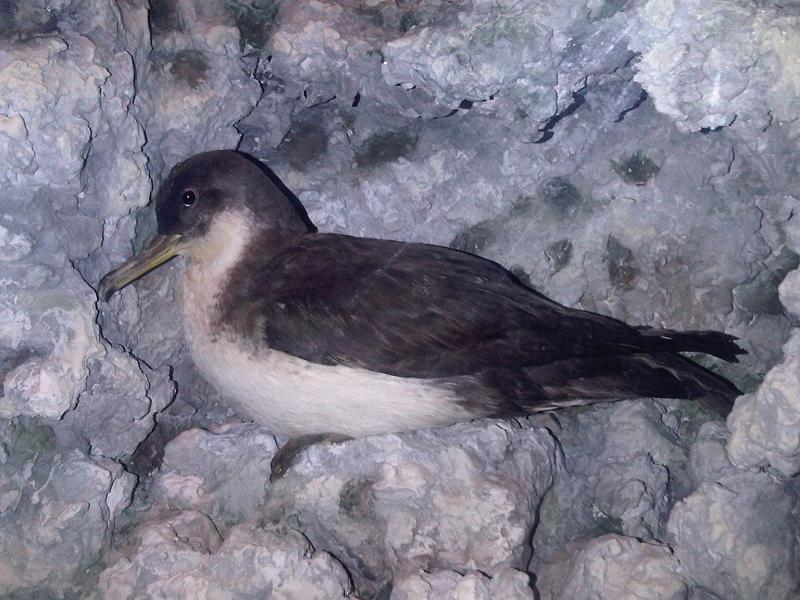
The IBA is an important nesting site for yelkouan shearwaters

The West of il-Ħaġra s-Sewda to ix-Xaqqa Cliffs Important Bird Area comprises a 4 ha linear strip of cliffed coastline in Siġġiewi, on the southern coast of Malta, in the Maltese archipelago of the Mediterranean Sea. Its steep and rugged cliffs rise from sea level to a height of 68 m. It was identified as an Important Bird Area (IBA) by BirdLife International because it supports 500–1000 breeding pairs of Cory's shearwaters and 80–100 pairs of yelkouan shearwaters.

== See also ==
- List of birds of Malta
