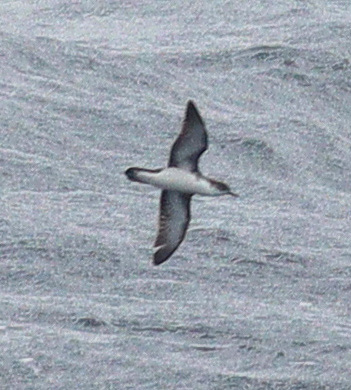

Scientific classification
- Kingdom: Animalia
- Phylum: Chordata
- Class: Aves
- Order: Procellariiformes
- Family: Procellariidae
- Genus: Puffinus
- Species: P. boydi

Binomial name
- Puffinus boydi Mathews, 1912

Synonyms
- P. assimilis boydi; P. lherminieri boydi; P. baroli boydi; P. parvus

= Boyd's shearwater =

Species of bird

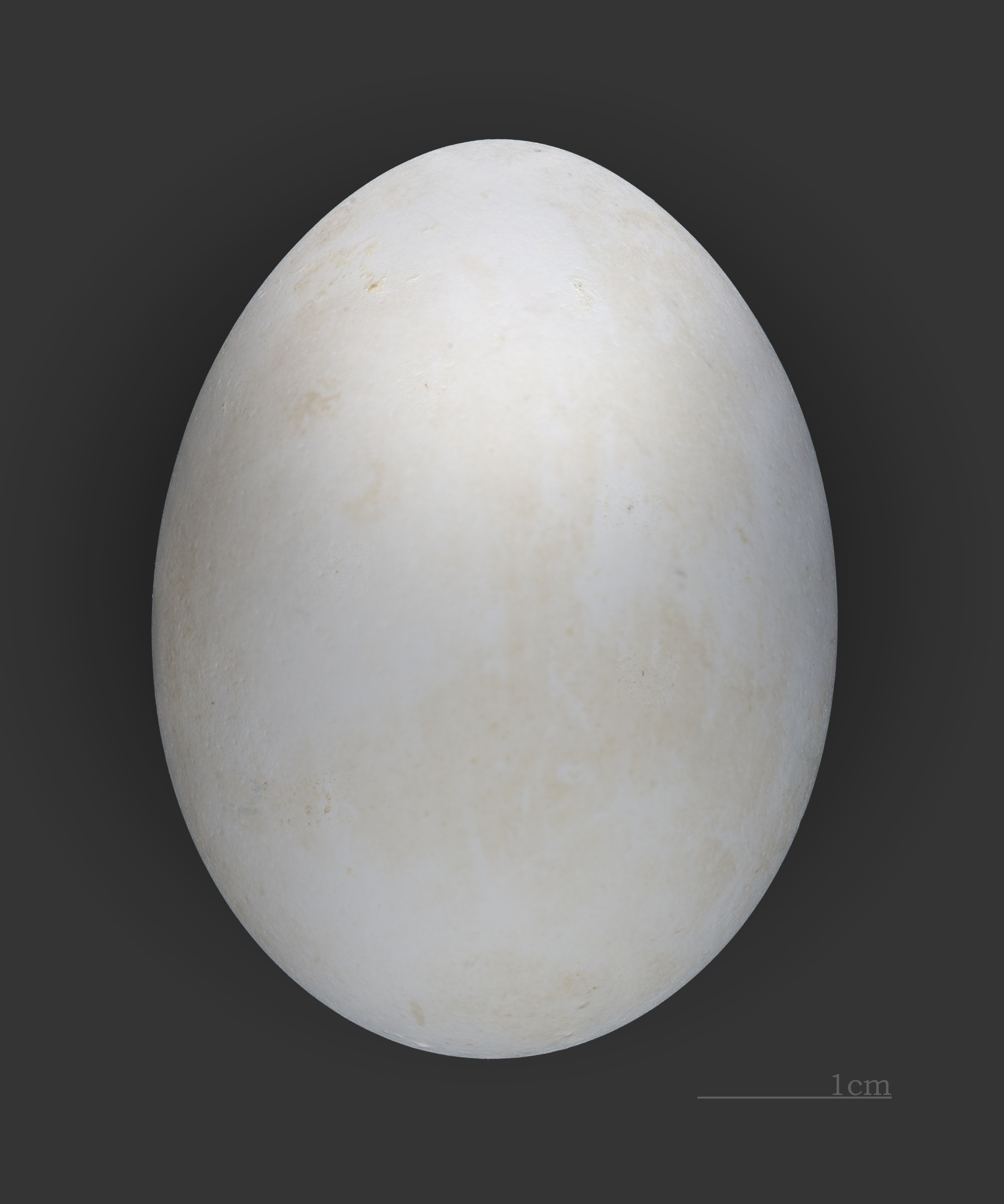
Egg of Puffinus boydi (coll.MHNT)

Boyd's shearwater (Puffinus boydi), also known as the Cape Verde little shearwater, is a small shearwater which breeds in the Cape Verde archipelago of the Atlantic Ocean some 570 km off the coast of West Africa. The epithet commemorates British ornithologist Arnold Boyd.

== Sexual Segregation ==
Females take longer foraging trips and travel further north. This seems to be driven by differing preferences for chlorophyll concentration and sea surface temperature. Overall spatial overlap of sexes is low. However, their diets are the same, consisting of fish, fish larvae, and squid. Both males and females feed chicks, but the males contribute more. This may be because females spend more time incubating eggs and are therefore more deprived of nutrition.

== Taxonomy ==
Boyd's shearwater is sometimes considered a subspecies of either the little shearwater, Audubon's shearwater or Macaronesian shearwater. It has also been shown to be synonymous with the extinct Puffinus parvus Shufeldt of Bermuda.
