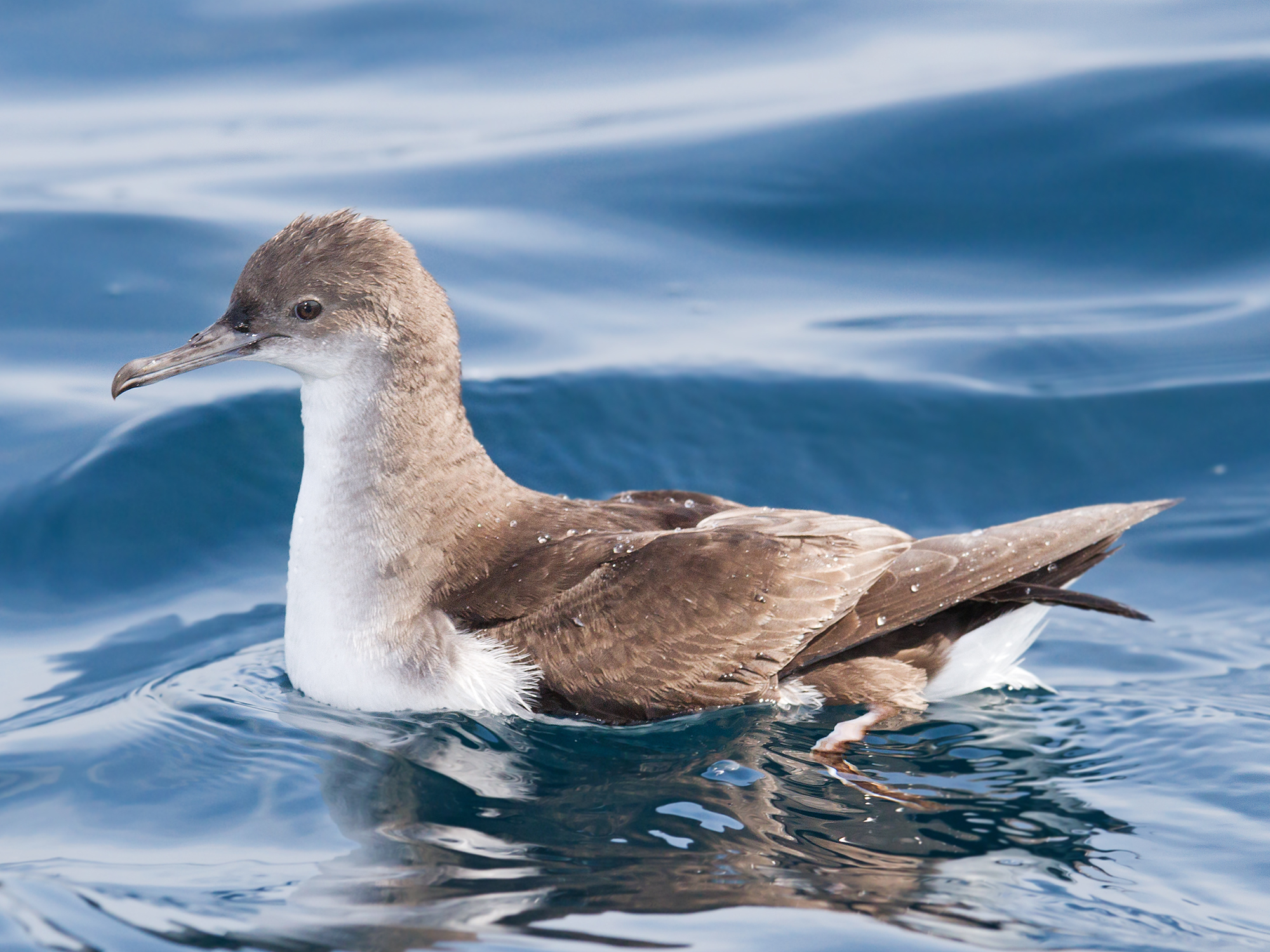
- Fluttering shearwater, Puffinus gavia

Scientific classification
- Kingdom: Animalia
- Phylum: Chordata
- Class: Aves
- Order: Procellariiformes
- Family: Procellariidae
- Genus: Puffinus; Brisson, 1760

Type species
- Procellaria puffinus (Manx shearwater) Brünnich, 1764

Species
- See text

Synonyms
- Thyellodroma Stejneger, 1888; Hemipuffinus Iredale, 1913; Neonectris Mathews, 1913

= Puffinus =

Genus of birds

Puffinus is a genus of seabirds in the order Procellariiformes that contains about 20 small to medium-sized shearwaters. Two other shearwater genera are named: Calonectris, which comprises three or four large shearwaters, and Ardenna with another seven species (formerly often included within Puffinus).

The taxonomy of this group is the cause of much debate, and the number of recognised species varies with the source.

The species in this group are long-winged birds, dark brown or black above, and white to dark brown below. They are pelagic outside the breeding season. They are most common in temperate and cold waters.

These tubenose birds fly with stiff wings, and use a shearing flight technique to move across wave fronts with the minimum of active flight. Some small species, such as the Manx shearwater, are cruciform in flight, with their long wings held directly out from their bodies.

Many are long-distance migrants, perhaps most spectacularly the sooty and short-tailed shearwaters, which perform migrations of 14,000 km or more each year.

Puffinus shearwaters come to islands and coastal cliffs only to breed. They are nocturnal at the colonial breeding sites, preferring moonless nights to minimise predation. They nest in burrows and often give eerie contact calls on their night-time visits. They lay a single white egg.

They feed on fish, squid and similar oceanic food. Some will follow fishing boats to take scraps, notably the sooty shearwater; these species also commonly follow whales to feed on fish disturbed by them.

== Taxonomy ==
The genus Puffinus was introduced by the French zoologist Mathurin Jacques Brisson in 1760 with the Manx shearwater (Puffinus puffinus) as the type species.

Traditionally, Puffinus has been grouped with the Procellaria and Calonectris shearwaters. However, more recent results have determined that the genus is apparently paraphyletic and while in part very close to Calonectris, forms a clade with the genera Pseudobulweria and Lugensa, which were formerly presumed to be gadfly petrels, and can be divided in what has been called the "Puffinus" and the "Neonectris" group after notable species; the latter has been separated as a distinct genus named Ardenna. The former is taxonomically confusing, with species having been split and remerged in the last years.

Puffinus is a Neo-Latin loanword based on the English "puffin". The original Latin term for shearwaters was usually the catchall name for sea-birds, mergus. "Puffin" and its variants, such as poffin, pophyn and puffing, referred to the cured carcass of the fat nestling of the shearwater, a former delicacy. The original usage dates from at least 1337, but from as early as 1678 the term gradually came to be used for another, unrelated, seabird, the Atlantic puffin, an auk. The current English name was first recorded in 1835 and refers to the former nesting of this species on the Isle of Man.

=== Extant species ===
The genus Puffinus contains the following 21 species:

Image	Scientific name	Common name	Distribution
	Puffinus nativitatis	Christmas shearwater	tropical Central Pacific.
	Puffinus puffinus	Manx shearwater	north Atlantic Ocean in the United Kingdom, Ireland, Iceland, the Faroe Islands, France, the Isle of Man, the Channel Islands, the Azores, Canary Islands, and Madeira
	Puffinus yelkouan	Yelkouan shearwater	eastern and central Mediterranean.
	Puffinus mauretanicus	Balearic shearwater	Morocco and Algeria
	Puffinus bryani	Bryan's shearwater	Hawaiian Islands
	Puffinus opisthomelas	Black-vented shearwater	Pacific Ocean and the Gulf of California
	Puffinus auricularis	Townsend's shearwater	Cerro Evermann on Isla Socorro in the Revillagigedo Islands, Mexico, though formerly present on Clarion Island and San Benedicto.
	Puffinus newelli	Newell's shearwater	Hawaiian Islands
	Puffinus myrtae	Rapa shearwater	islets of Rapa in the Austral Islands of French Polynesia
	Puffinus gavia	Fluttering shearwater	New Zealand and migrates to Australia and the Solomon Islands.
	Puffinus huttoni	Hutton's shearwater	New Zealand
	Puffinus lherminieri	Sargasso shearwater	The Caribbean and parts of the western Atlantic.
	Puffinus persicus	Persian shearwater	southern Red Sea, the Gulf of Aden and the Somali coast across the south of the Arabian Peninsula to the Gulf of Oman, Pakistan and western India
	Puffinus bailloni	Tropical shearwater or Baillon's shearwater	eastern Indo-Pacific; western Indian Ocean
	Puffinus subalaris	Galápagos shearwater	Galápagos Islands
	Puffinus bannermani	Bannerman's shearwater	Volcano Islands in the Ogasawara Group to the southwest of Japan
	Puffinus heinrothi	Heinroth's shearwater	the Bismarck Archipelago and northern Solomon Islands
	Puffinus assimilis	Little shearwater	Australia & New Zealand
	Puffinus elegans	Subantarctic shearwater	Tristan da Cunha, islands of the southern Indian Ocean and New Zealand Subantarctic Islands
	Puffinus baroli	Barolo shearwater	Azores and Canaries
	Puffinus boydi	Boyd's shearwater	Cape Verde

=== Phylogeny ===
Phylogeny of the genus based on a study by Joan Ferrer Obiol and collaborators published in 2022. Only 14 of the 21 recognised species were included.

- Puffinus
  - Christmas shearwater, Puffinus nativitatis
  - - - Fluttering shearwater, Puffinus gavia
      - Hutton's shearwater, Puffinus huttoni
    - - - - Sargasso shearwater, Puffinus lhermineri
          - - Barolo shearwater, Puffinus baroli
            - Boyd's shearwater, Puffinus boydi
        - - Manx shearwater, Puffinus puffinus
          - - Balearic shearwater, Puffinus mauretanicus
            - Yelkouan shearwater, Puffinus yelkouan
      - - - Little shearwater, Puffinus assimilis
          - Subantarctic shearwater, Puffinus elegans
        - - Tropical shearwater, Puffinus bailloni
          - - Black-vented shearwater, Puffinus opisthomels
            - Newell's shearwater, Puffinus newelli

=== Fossil record ===
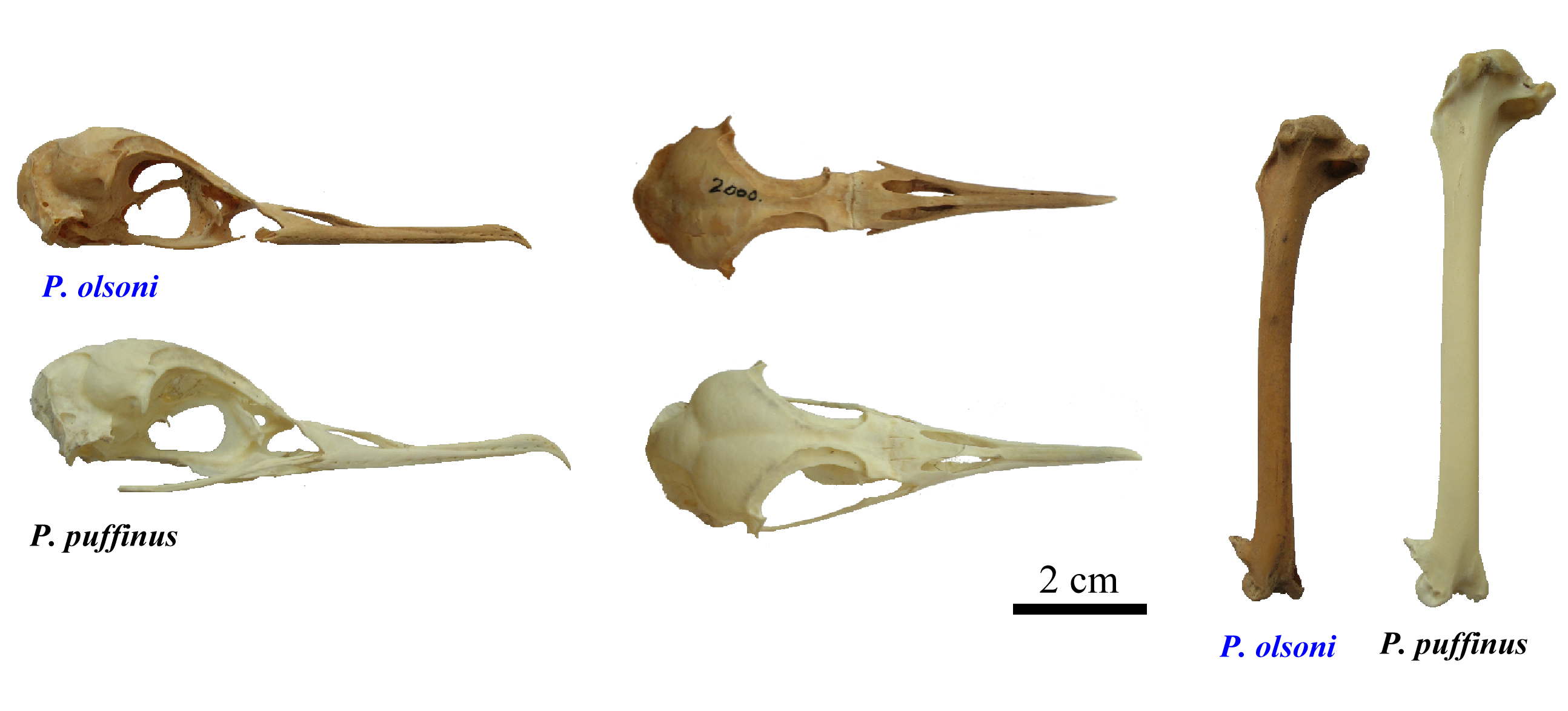
Comparison between P. olsoni and P. puffinus

Several fossil species which became extinct long ago are also known. The proportion of larger ("Neonectris") species apparently was larger before the Pliocene, i.e. before marine mammals diversified:

- "Puffinus" group
  - Menorcan shearwater, Puffinus sp. (prehistoric) – possibly extirpated population of extant species; tentatively placed in this group
  - Dune shearwater or Hole's shearwater, Puffinus holeae (prehistoric)
  - Lava shearwater or Olson's shearwater, Puffinus olsoni (prehistoric) – tentatively placed in this group
  - Bermuda shearwater, Puffinus parvus (extinct) – tentatively placed in this group; possibly synonymous with P. lherminieri
  - Scarlett's shearwater, Puffinus spelaeus (prehistoric)
  - Puffinus tedfordi (Pleistocene of western North America)
  - Puffinus nestori (Late Pliocene/Early Pleistocene of Ibiza)
- "Neonectris" group
  - Puffinus sp. 1 (Late Miocene/Early Pliocene of Lee Creek Mine, US)
  - Puffinus sp. 2 (Late Miocene/Early Pliocene of Lee Creek Mine, US)
- Unassigned:
  - ?Puffinus raemdonckii (Early Oligocene of Belgium) – formerly in Larus
  - Puffinus micraulax (Early Miocene of C Florida, US) – probably "Puffinus" group
  - Puffinus sp. (Early Miocene of Calvert County, US)
  - Puffinus sp. (Early Pliocene of South Africa)
  - Puffinus felthami (Pleistocene of W North America)
  - Puffinus kanakoffi (Pleistocene of W North America)
  - "Puffinus" aquitanicus
  - Puffinus antiquus
  - Puffinus barnesi
  - Puffinus calhouni
  - Puffinus diatomicus
  - Puffinus inceptor
  - Puffinus mitchelli
  - Puffinus priscus

"Puffinus" arvernensis (Early Miocene of France) is now considered a primitive albatross of the fossil genus Plotornis. Some other species like P. conradi and P. pacificoides have been reclassified as those of Ardenna.

== See also ==
- List of extinct birds
