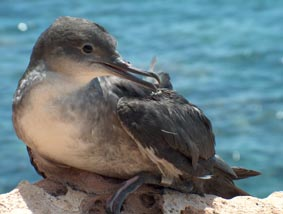

Conservation status
- Critically Endangered (IUCN 3.1)

Scientific classification
- Kingdom: Animalia
- Phylum: Chordata
- Class: Aves
- Order: Procellariiformes
- Family: Procellariidae
- Genus: Puffinus
- Species: P. mauretanicus

Binomial name
- Puffinus mauretanicus Lowe, 1921

Synonyms
- Puffinus puffinus mauretanicus Puffinus yelkouan mauretanicus

= Balearic shearwater =

Species of bird

The Balearic shearwater (Puffinus mauretanicus) is a medium-sized shearwater in the seabird family Procellariidae. Puffinus is a Neo-Latin loanword based on the English "puffin" and its variants, that referred to the cured carcass of the fat nestling of the Manx shearwater, a former delicacy. The specific mauretanicus refers to Mauretania, an old name for an area of North Africa roughly corresponding to Morocco and Algeria. The Balearic Shearwater is listed critically endangered by the IUCN and is one of Europe's most endangered seabirds.

== Taxonomy ==
The Balearic shearwater was formally described in 1921 by the English ornithologist Percy Lowe. He treated it as a subspecies of the Manx shearwater and coined the trinomial name Puffinus puffinus mauretanicus.

The Balearic shearwater was long regarded a subspecies of the Manx shearwater. Following an initial split, it was held to be a subspecies of the "Mediterranean shearwater" for nearly ten more years, until it was resolved to be a distinct species, separate from the yelkouan shearwater.

A molecular phylogenetic study published in 2021 found very little genetic difference between the Balearic shearwater and the yelkouan shearwater (Puffinus yelkouan). The authors of the study suggested that these two taxa might be better considered as conspecific.

It appears to belong to a group of Mediterranean and adjacent Atlantic species which includes the yelkouan shearwater and one to three prehistorically extinct taxa, Hole's and possibly also Olson's shearwater and an undescribed form of unclear distinctness from Menorca. The two living Mediterranean lineages had probably separated before the end of the Pliocene (c. 2 mya), as indicated by molecular differences and the Ibizan fossil Puffinus nestori from the Late Pliocene or Early Pleistocene, which may have been the direct ancestor of the present species.

== Description ==
Balearic shearwater is 34–39 cm (13–15 in) in length and has a wingspan of 78–90 cm (31–35 in). It has the typically "shearing" flight of the genus, dipping from side to side on stiff wings with few wingbeats, the wingtips almost touching the water. This bird looks like a flying cross, with its wing held at right angles to the body, and it changes from dark brown to dirty white as the dark upperparts and paler undersides are alternately exposed as it travels low over the sea.

Apart from its less contrasting plumage, this species is very similar to the Manx and yelkouan shearwaters found elsewhere in the Mediterranean. At least one mixed breeding colony of Balearic and yelkouan shearwaters exists on Menorca, and the species' winter ranges overlap in the Central Mediterranean; for scientific purposes at least, a combination of morphological characteristics and DNA sequence data is suggested to identify the species.

== Distribution and habitat ==
This species breeds on islands and coastal cliffs in the Balearic Islands. Most winter in that sea, but some enter the Atlantic in late summer, reaching north to Great Britain and Ireland.

== Behaviour ==
This is a gregarious species, which can be seen in large numbers from boats or headlands, especially in autumn. It is silent at sea, but at night the breeding colonies are alive with raucous cackling calls, higher pitched than the Manx shearwater's.

=== Breeding ===
This species nests in burrows and caves which are visited only at night to avoid predation by large gulls.

=== Feeding ===
The Balearic shearwater feeds on fish and molluscs. It does not follow boats.

== Conservation and threats ==
The Balearic shearwater is considered critically endangered with extinction by the IUCN. Recent models estimate a mean decrease of 7.4% per year and a mean extinction time of 40.4 years. This equates to an ongoing decline of more than 80% over the next three generations (54 years). It is under severe threat from the development of holiday resorts near its breeding sites. These can destroy or alter its natural breeding habitat by, for example, producing light pollution around nesting colonies. Predation from introduced animals such as cats and rats also cause problems. The discovery of yelkouan shearwaters in the Menorcan colony suggests that hybridization may also pose a problem. A further problem for conservation of the Balearic shearwater is that 25 official languages are spoken across its distribution, hampering the dissemination of conservation information. The Balearic shearwater is one of the species to which the Agreement on the Conservation of Albatrosses and Petrels applies.
