= Puffinus nestori =

Puffinus nestori Temporal range: Late Pliocene to early Pleistocene

Scientific classification
- Kingdom: Animalia
- Phylum: Chordata
- Class: Aves
- Order: Procellariiformes
- Family: Procellariidae
- Genus: Puffinus
- Species: P. nestori

Binomial name
- Puffinus nestori Alcover, 1989

Extinct species of bird

Puffinus nestori is an extinct seabird in the petrel family. Its fossil remains, dating from the late Pliocene to early Pleistocene, were found on the island of Ibiza of the Balearic archipelago in the western Mediterranean. It was speculated that it was the direct ancestor of the Mediterranean shearwater (now split into Balearic and yelkouan shearwaters).
