= Bryan's shearwater =

Conservation status
- Critically Endangered (IUCN 3.1)

Scientific classification
- Kingdom: Animalia
- Phylum: Chordata
- Class: Aves
- Order: Procellariiformes
- Family: Procellariidae
- Genus: Puffinus
- Species: P. bryani

Binomial name
- Puffinus bryani Pyle, Welch & Fleischer, RC, 2011
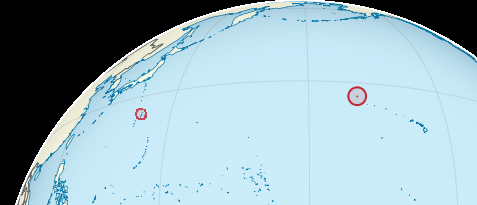

Species of seabird

Bryan's shearwater (Puffinus bryani) is a species of shearwater that may occur around the Hawaiian Islands. It is the smallest species of shearwater and is black and white with a bluish gray beak and blue tarsi. First collected in 1963 and thought to be a little shearwater (Puffinus assimilis) it was determined using DNA analysis to be distinct in 2011. It is rare and possibly threatened and there is little information on its breeding or non-breeding ranges. The species is named after Edwin Horace Bryan Jr. a former curator of the B. P. Bishop Museum at Honolulu.

On February 7, 2012, DNA tests on six specimens found in Ogasawara alive and dead between 1997 and 2011 determined that they were Bryan's shearwaters. It is assumed that Bryan's shearwaters still survive on some of the uninhabited Bonin Islands.

In 2015 a small breeding colony of Bryan's shearwaters was found on the island of Higashijima in Japan.
