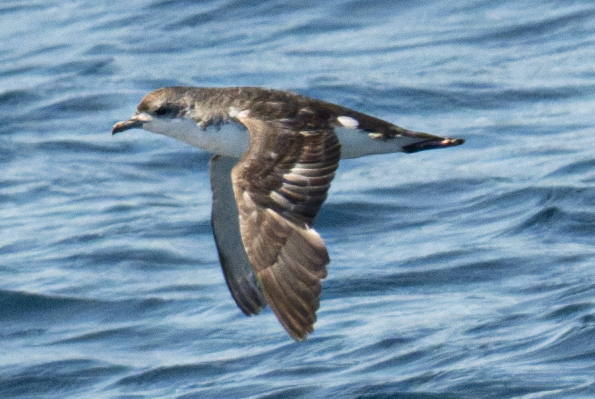

Conservation status
- Least Concern (IUCN 3.1)

Scientific classification
- Kingdom: Animalia
- Phylum: Chordata
- Class: Aves
- Order: Procellariiformes
- Family: Procellariidae
- Genus: Puffinus
- Species: P. elegans

Binomial name
- Puffinus elegans Giglioli & Salvadori, 1869

Synonyms
- P. assimilis elegans

= Subantarctic shearwater =

Species of bird

The subantarctic shearwater (Puffinus elegans) is a small bird species which breeds in Tristan da Cunha, islands of the southern Indian Ocean and New Zealand Subantarctic Islands.

== Taxonomy ==
The subantarctic shearwater is sometimes considered a subspecies of the little shearwater.
