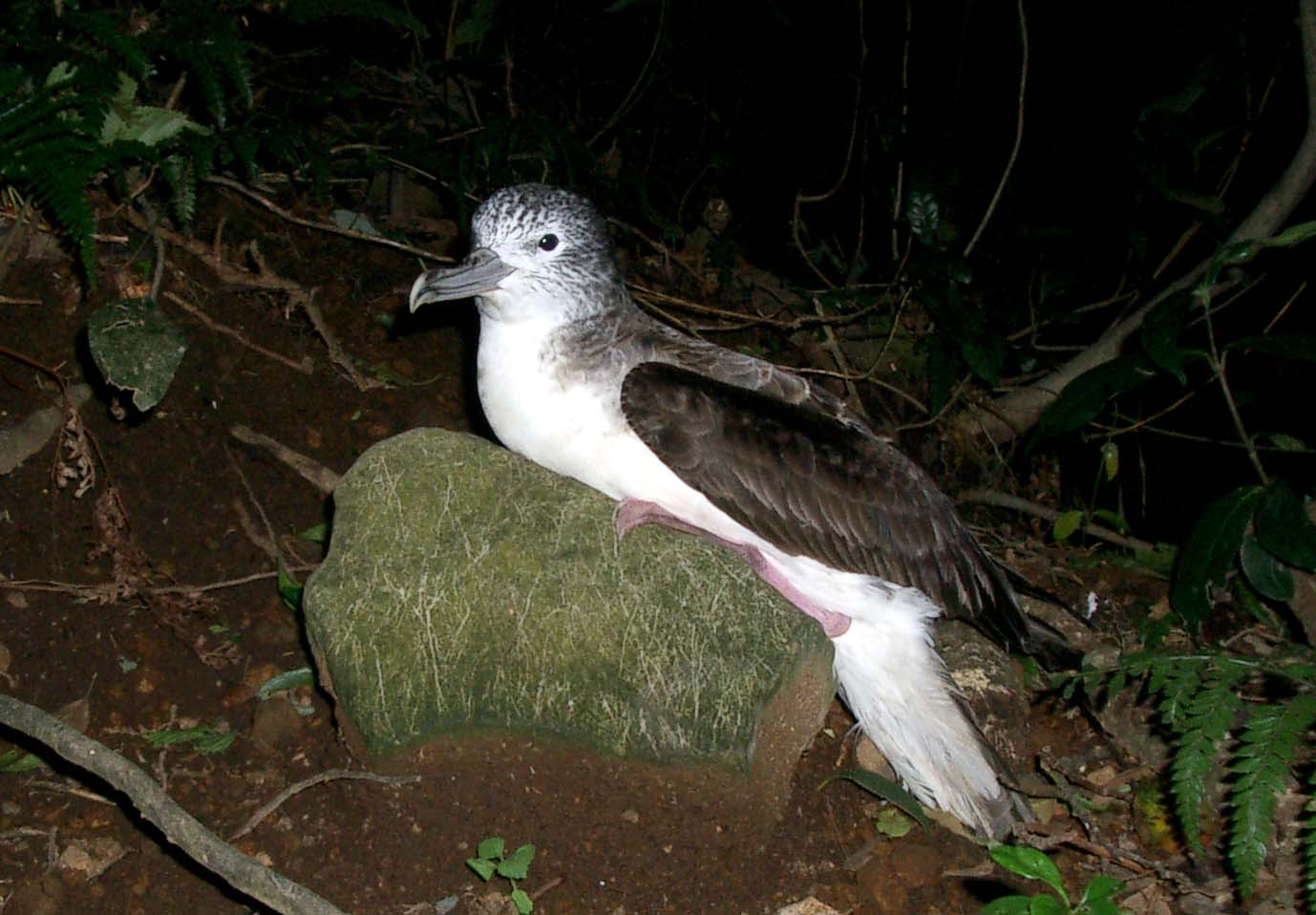

Conservation status
- Near Threatened (IUCN 3.1)

Scientific classification
- Kingdom: Animalia
- Phylum: Chordata
- Class: Aves
- Order: Procellariiformes
- Family: Procellariidae
- Genus: Calonectris
- Species: C. leucomelas

Binomial name
- Calonectris leucomelas (Temminck, 1836)

= Streaked shearwater =

Species of bird

The streaked shearwater (Calonectris leucomelas) is a seabird in the family Procellariidae. It is native to the Northwest Pacific, ranging from Japan down to Australia.

== Description ==
Adults have a long, slim bill with a small head and long neck. Wings are long and broad, with the elbows held at a forward angle. Adults are typically grey-brown above, with pale fringes that give a scalloped effect when seen at a close range. The head appears pale-faced with streaking on the crown and nape, with a horn-coloured bill with a dark, smudgy-grey tip. The underparts are mostly white, with darker flight feathers and a dark patch on the primary coverts. In worn plumage, streaked shearwaters may have a white crescent at the base of their tail.

=== Sexual dimorphism in size ===
Males and females have the same appearance, although males are slightly larger than females, with deeper, longer bills and longer heads. The body mass of streaked shearwaters ranges from 440 to 545 grams.

Size differences in male and female streaked shearwaters
	Males	Females
Bill depth (mm)	12.6± 1.1	11.2± 0.5
Bill length (mm)	52.0± 1.9	48.5± 1.9
Head length (mm)	105.1± 2.1	98.5± 2.6
Tarsus length (mm)	53.8± 1.9	51.0± 1.8
Wingspan (mm)	1,130.5± 14.0	1106.6± 25.9
Wing area (cm^{2})	1302.0± 85.2	1220.5± 92.0

Streaked shearwater in flight.

=== Plumage ===
The head is white at the base and has variable brown streaking, which becomes incresingly heavy towards the neck and hind crown, with a subtle white eye ring. The chin, throat, and foreneck are mostly white, though rarely they may be streaked. The mantle, back scapulars, rump, and uppertail are dark brown with white tips to feathers in fresh plumage. The uppertail has traces of pale U-shaped mark, formed by the pale bases to coverts that become more prominent with wear. The underparts are mostly white with a variable dark brown partial collar from the hindneck down onto the sides of the neck and upperbreast. The underwing is mainly white, with black-brown flight feathers and dark smudges on the leading edge of the outerwing and a with a broad dark tip. The upperwing has dark brown flight feathers and paler coverts with white fringes.

Juvenile birds can sometimes be recognized by their worn plumage during the early breeding season in May, and may be freshly moulted by November.

==== Moult and wear ====
Adults typically moult their body feathers during the chick-rearing period. They will moult their flight feathers separately, following the breeding season and dispersal, between November and March.

== Habitat and distribution ==
Streaked shearwaters range from the Northwest Pacific down to Australia. They breed on islands between Ryukyu Island, south through Izu, Ryukyu, Daito, and Senkaku groups to islands off the coast of Hokkaido in the north. They also nest on islands off China, Korea, and in the south-east China Sea, around the Philippines, Indonesia, Papua New Guinea, Coral Sea, and Indian Ocean as far east as Sri Lanka, Maldives, and Abrolhos Island.

=== Habitat ===
They are marine and partly pelagic seabirds, but are also known to occur over inshore waters.

==== Breeding season ====
During the breeding season, streaked shearwaters nest on small, sloping forested islands, mostly wooded with Machilus thunbergii. Their presence on these islands causes disturbances via trampling and burrowing, which can decrease the abundance of native plants.

==== Non-breeding season ====
During the non-breeding season, streaked shearwaters are found in regions of deep water, often as far as 5,400km from their colonies.

=== Vagrancy ===
There are many records of streaked shearwaters occurring outside of their native range. These include Wyoming and California, United States of America, the South coast of Western Australia, South Africa, as well as off the coast of Eilat, Israel and Aqaba, Jordan, in the Red Sea.

== Taxonomy ==
The streaked shearwater is a member of the Procellariidae family, which is a widespread group comprising the fulmarine petrels, the gadfly petrels, the diving petrels, the prions, and the shearwaters. It was first described by Temminck in 1836 as Procellaria leucomelas, but was later moved to the genus Calonectris by Mathews and Iredale in 1915.

== Behaviour ==
Streaked shearwaters are generally gregarious, sometimes forming large flocks when foraging. They are often found associating with other seabirds, especially Procellariiformes, as well as larger marine predators such as dolphins and larger fish. They are often observed following fishing boats and anchocy trawls off the shores of Japan.

=== Vocalizations ===
Males will typically give high-pitched piping or squealing whistles that are usually trisyllabic. Females give lower-pitched, nasal honking note that can range in duration and may be uttered singly or in series. Small chicks will utter high-pitched begging calls that are distinct from adults, but will utter either the male or female calls by the time they fledge from the colony.

=== Flight ===
Their flight is similar to that of Cory's shearwater, but lazier, more direct, and mollymawk-like with dynamic soaring in strong winds. In light to moderate winds, their flight is rather languid, with loose wingbeats and low wheeling glides. To take-off from the water, they require a running start. To take off from land, they required either a cliff edge or trees to climb for take-off.

=== Reproduction ===
Birds arrive to the breeding colony during the months of February and March. Between their arrival and the beginning of burrow excavation or repair in April, mating pairs will form or re-form. Burrows are typically dug in areas with sparse ground cover near a cliff or near trees. A single egg is laid in an L-shaped or straight burrow, typically between May and mid-to late June. Both parents in the breeding pair take turns incubating the egg, which hatches 45-64 days after being laid. Both parents take turns feeding the chick, which occurs at night. After around 75-91 days of chick rearing, the chick is independent from their parents and will fledge the nest. Chicks will often exit the nest and flap their wings in preparation for their first flight.

=== Diet and foraging ===
Streaked shearwaters feed mainly from the sea surface, targeting schools of pelagic fish. The primary prey items of streaked shearwaters during shorter foraging trips spent in warmer regions are the Japanese anchovy, Japanese flyingfish and the Japanese Common Squid. During longer foraging trips, birds, tend to forage in colder regions and feed on Japanese anchovy and Pacific saury. This foraging strategy is referred to as the dual foraging strategy, where during longer trips, they forage in cold waters of high food abundance, resulting in an increase in body mass, but during shorter trips they forage in warmer waters with low productivity, allowing them to provision chicks more quickly. These shorter foraging trips correspond to a decrease in body mass.

During the chick-rearing period, foraging trips are typically 1-2 days in length, but can be up to 10 days long in some instances. On those longer foraging trips, as much as half of the stomach contents contains "stomach oil" which is produced in the proventriculus by extracting fatsfrom ingested food and is fed to chicks back at the colony.

Their foraging behaviour is comprised mainly of surface seizing and foraging dives. Surface seizing is characterized by successive take-offs and landings, whereas foraging dives are short and shallow subsurface dives.

== Relationship with humans ==
=== Hunting ===
Streaked shearwaters have been sustainably hunted in on Mikura Island, Japan for at least 250 years, where fully grown chicks were the primary targets of harvest from burrows in the fall. The regulations surrounding their harvest were established by traditionally developed and adopted rules based on traditional ecological knowledge. In 1918, the harvesting of streaked shearwaters was prohibited by the Game Act, although inhabitants of Mikura Island continued to hunt the birds as a form of pest control, which was allowed by the government. While the harvesting of eggs and adults was prohibited under this traditionally-established law, the harvesting of eggs laid on the ground outside of burrows was allowed. The number of shearwaters harvested peaked between the years of 1951 and 1977. In 1978, the Japanese Government decreased the annual quota, a move which was influenced by social movement of the Wild Bird Society of Japan. In 1984, increased ferry service to Mikura Island from Miyake Island allowed the inhabitants of Mikura to no longer depend on streaked shearwaters as a food source. Although this decreased the harvesting of the birds, it also led to the rapid loss of the traditional ecological unwritten rules that protected the streaked shearwater populations and kept them stable throughout the years.

== Threats ==
Current threats faced by streaked shearwaters in their breeding habitat include predation by Norway rats, as well as domestic cats and dogs. Other significant threats to their population include fisheries bycatch, oil spillage, and military activity.
