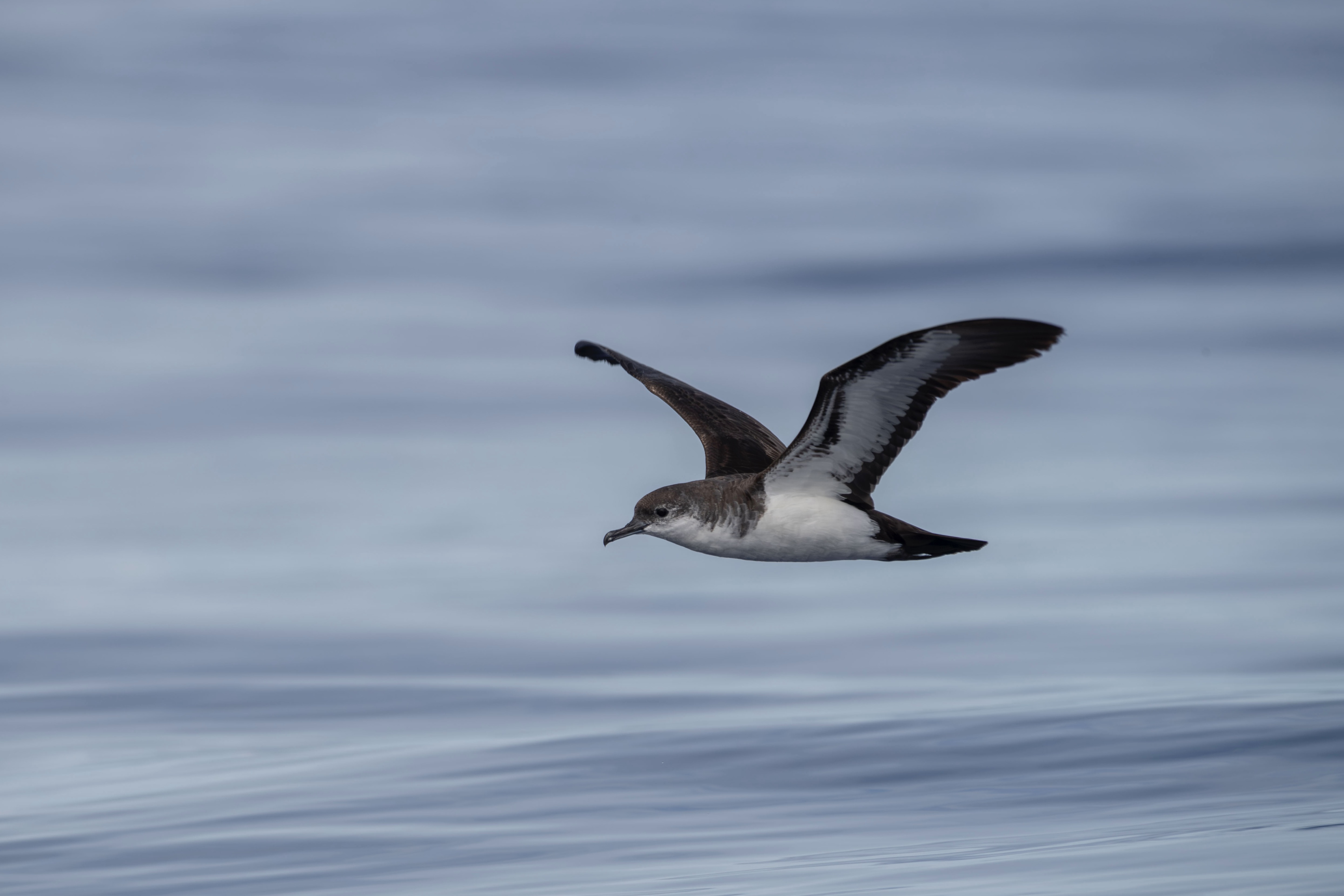

Conservation status
- Endangered (IUCN 3.1)

Scientific classification
- Kingdom: Animalia
- Phylum: Chordata
- Class: Aves
- Order: Procellariiformes
- Family: Procellariidae
- Genus: Puffinus
- Species: P. bannermani

Binomial name
- Puffinus bannermani Mathews & Iredale, 1915

= Bannerman's shearwater =

Species of bird

Bannerman's shearwater (Puffinus bannermani) is a seabird in the family Procellariidae formerly considered conspecific with Audubon's shearwater (Puffinus lherminieri).

== Range ==
Little is known of this species other than that it breeds in the Volcano Islands in the Ogasawara Group to the southwest of Japan and doesn't seem to range far from this area.

== Population ==
The species population size has not been estimated but is assessed to be decreasing.

== Diet and Habitat ==
Not much is known about this species and more research is required to obtain an understanding of its ecology. Based on the ecology of closely related species, P. bannermani is thought likely to feed on fish, squid and cephalopods, by surface-seizing, underwater pursuit, including diving and plunging, and pattering (del Hoyo et al. 1992, Brooke 2004). It is likely to nest in rock crevices or burrows and form colonies (del Hoyo et al. 1992).
