= Rapa shearwater =

Conservation status
- Critically Endangered (IUCN 3.1)

Scientific classification
- Kingdom: Animalia
- Phylum: Chordata
- Class: Aves
- Order: Procellariiformes
- Family: Procellariidae
- Genus: Puffinus
- Species: P. myrtae

Binomial name
- Puffinus myrtae Bourne, 1959

Synonyms
- Puffinus newelli myrtae Puffinus assimilis myrtae Puffinus auricularis myrtae

Species of bird

The Rapa shearwater (Puffinus myrtae), is a rare seabird of the tropics from the family Procellariidae. It breeds on the surrounding islets of Rapa in the Austral Islands of French Polynesia where it is known locally as the kaki kaki.

The Rapa shearwater was first described in 1959 as a subspecies of the little shearwater. The holotype was later found to be a juvenile and an adult specimen was described in 2017.

A 2015 genetic study using DNA sequences of the mitochondrial cytochrome b gene, found that the Rapa shearwater is sister to a clade containing the Hawaiian shearwater (Puffinus newelli) and the little shearwater (Puffinus assimilis). Morphological data supports this relationship but the Rapa shearwater is much smaller than the other two species.

Not much is known about its decline. It most likely once occurred on Rapa itself, though this population has been extirpated by the polynesian rat, feral goats, and feral cats.
