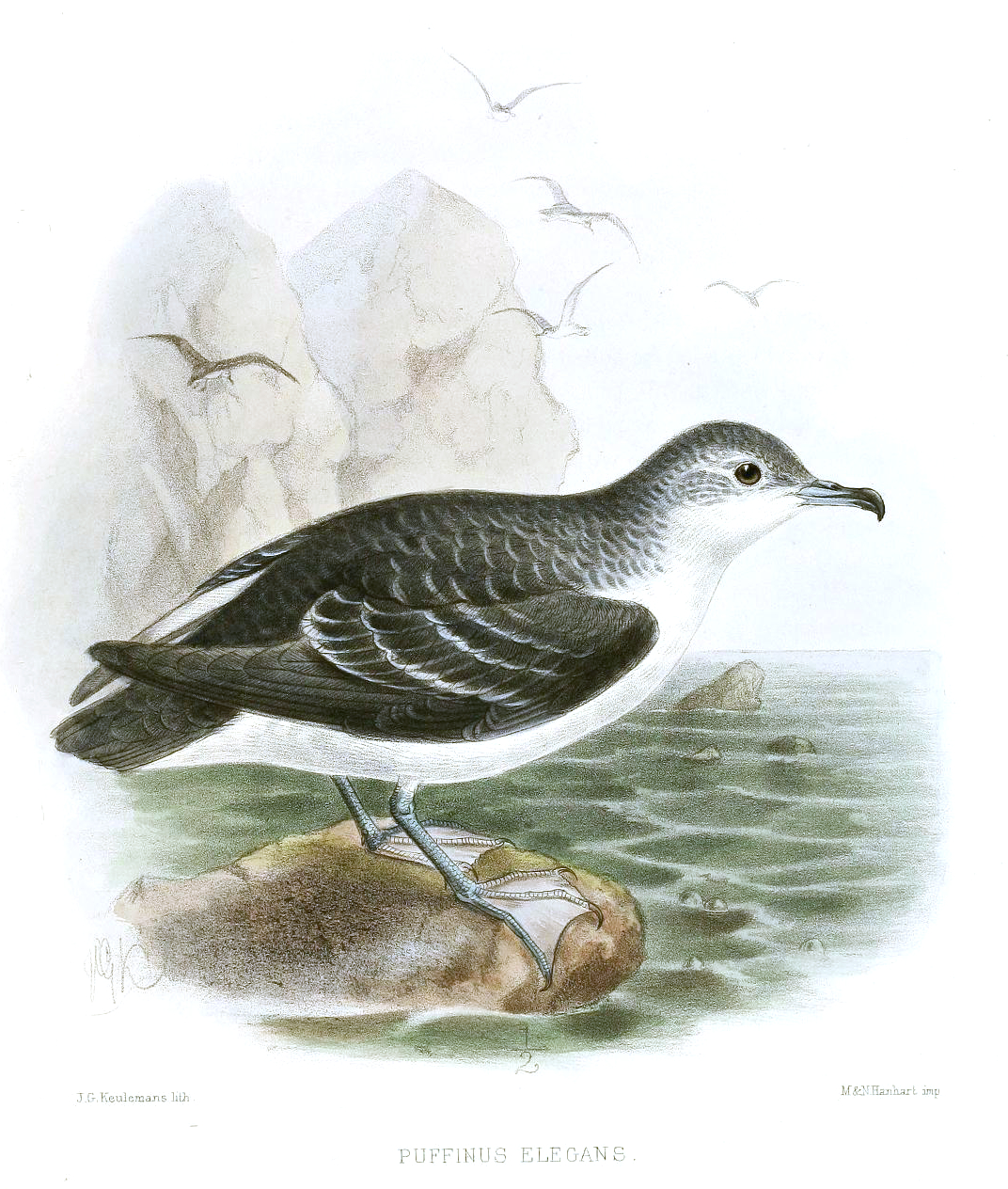
- Puffinus assimilis elegans

Conservation status
- Least Concern (IUCN 3.1)

Scientific classification
- Kingdom: Animalia
- Phylum: Chordata
- Class: Aves
- Order: Procellariiformes
- Family: Procellariidae
- Genus: Puffinus
- Species: P. assimilis

Binomial name
- Puffinus assimilis Gould, 1838

Subspecies
- P. a. assimilis (Gould, 1838) Tasman Sea little shearwater; P. a. tunneyi Mathews, 1912 Western Australia little shearwater; P. a. kermadecensis Murphy, 1927 Kermadec little shearwater; P. a. haurakiensis J. H. Fleming & Serventy, 1943 New Zealand little shearwater

= Little shearwater =

Species of bird

The little shearwater (Puffinus assimilis) is a small shearwater in the petrel family Procellariidae. Despite the generic name, it is unrelated to the puffins, which are auks, the only similarity being that they are both burrow-nesting seabirds.

== Description ==
This shearwater has the typically "shearing" flight of the genus, dipping from side to side on stiff wings with few beats, the wingtips almost touching the water, though in light winds it has a more flapping flight than that of its larger relatives. In flight it looks cross-shaped, with its wings held at right angles to the body, its colouration changing from black to white as the black upperparts and white underparts are alternately exposed as it travels low over the sea.

At 25–30 cm (9.8–11.8 in) in length with a 58–67 cm (23–26 in) wingspan, it is like a small Manx shearwater but has proportionally shorter and broader wings, with a pale area on the inner flight feathers. Its bill is more slender than that of Manx, and its dark eye stands out against the surrounding white area.

== Taxonomy ==
mtDNA cytochrome b sequence data indicate that the former North Atlantic little shearwater group (Boyd's shearwater, P. boydi and Barolo shearwater, P. baroli) is closer to Audubon's shearwater (Austin 1996, Heidrich et al. 1998), (although many taxonomists now consider them to be distinct species), and Rapa shearwater (P. myrtae), being closer to the Newell's and possibly Townsend's shearwater (Austin et al. 2004). Heinroth's shearwater was also sometimes considered a subspecies of this bird; the relationship between the little and Audubon's shearwater is probably not as close as long believed (Austin 1996, Heidrich et al. 1998, Austin et al. 2001, but see also Penhallurick & Wink 2004, and Rheindt & Austin 2005). The subantarctic shearwater was also considered conspecific (Onley & Scofield 2007, Gill et al. 2010)

== Distribution and habitat ==
- P. a. assimilis Gould, 1838 — Lord Howe Island and Norfolk Island
- P. a. haurakiensis Fleming, CA & Serventy, 1943 — northeastern North Island (NZ)
- P. a. kermadecensis Murphy, 1927 — Kermadec Islands
- P. a. tunneyi Mathews, 1912 — islands off southwestern Australia

It breeds in colonies on islands and coastal cliffs, nesting in burrows which are only visited at night to avoid predation by large gulls.

== Behaviour ==
This is a gregarious species, which can be seen in large numbers from boats or headlands, especially on migration in autumn. It feeds on fish and molluscs. It does not follow boats. It is silent at sea, but at night the breeding colonies are alive with raucous cackling calls.

It nests in cavities located in grassy fields or in those found among rocks.

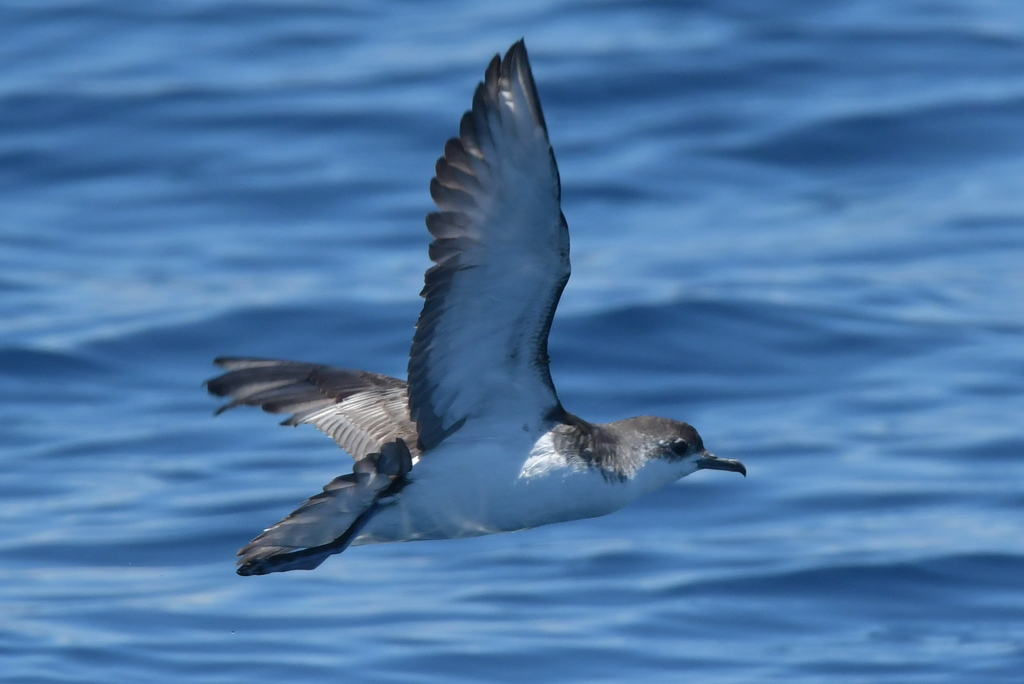
Hauraki little shearwater (P. a. haurakiensis) near New Zealand

The little shearwater usually produces a clutch of one clear white egg, measuring around 51 by 35 millimetres (2.0 by 1.4 in). The egg is incubated for 52 to 58 days by both sexes.
