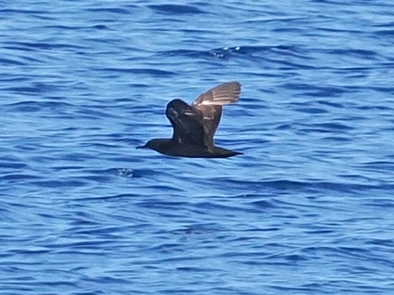

Conservation status
- Vulnerable (IUCN 3.1)

Scientific classification
- Kingdom: Animalia
- Phylum: Chordata
- Class: Aves
- Order: Procellariiformes
- Family: Procellariidae
- Genus: Puffinus
- Species: P. heinrothi

Binomial name
- Puffinus heinrothi Reichenow, 1919

Synonyms
- Puffinns heinrothi Reichenow, 1919 (lapsus)

= Heinroth's shearwater =

Species of bird

Heinroth's shearwater (Puffinus heinrothi) is a poorly known seabird in the family Procellariidae. Probably a close relative of the little shearwater or Audubon's shearwater (with which it is sometimes considered conspecific), it is distinguished by a long and slender bill and a brown-washed underside.

This species is restricted to the seas around the Bismarck Archipelago and northern Solomon Islands. The breeding sites of the species have never been found, although reports of individuals (including recently fledged chicks) on Bougainville and Kolombangara strongly suggest that they breed there, possibly high in the mountains (an inference based on the breeding behaviour of close relatives). There is very little information about the species and it is uncertain if it is threatened or in decline.
