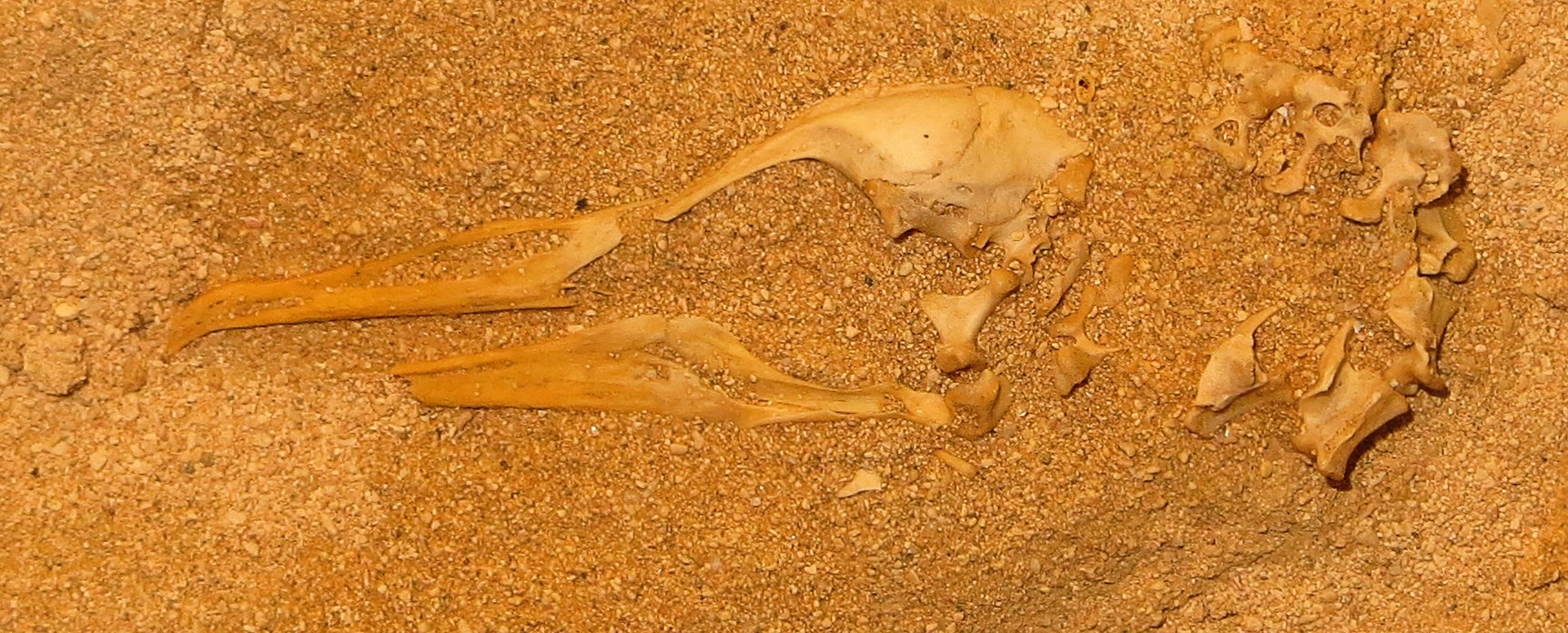
- Skull and neck

Scientific classification
- Kingdom: Animalia
- Phylum: Chordata
- Class: Aves
- Order: Procellariiformes
- Family: Procellariidae
- Genus: Puffinus
- Species: P. holeae

Binomial name
- Puffinus holeae Walker, Wragg & Harrison 1990

= Dune shearwater =

Dune shearwater Temporal range: Late Pleistocene-Holocene

Extinct species of bird

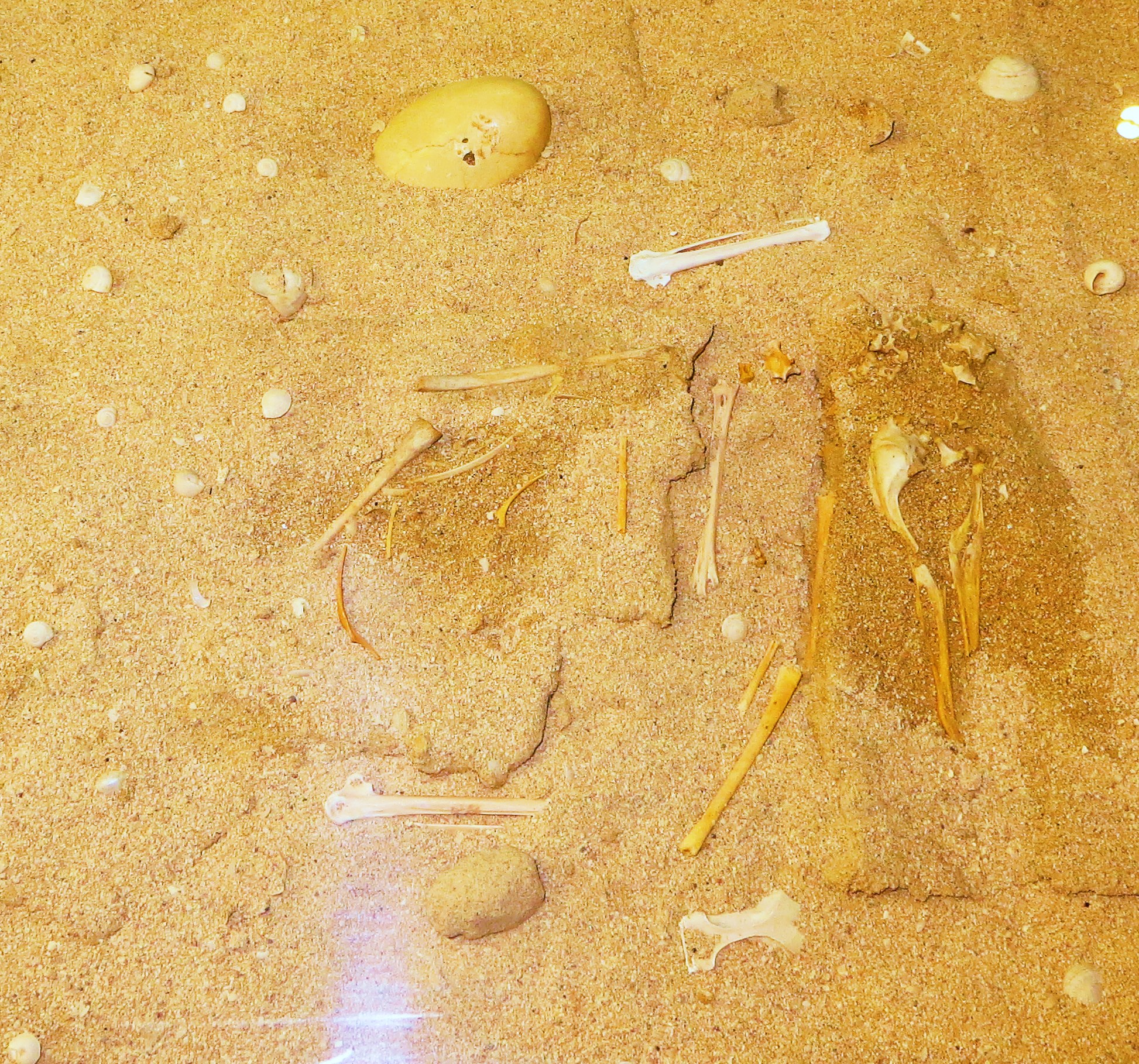
Various fossils

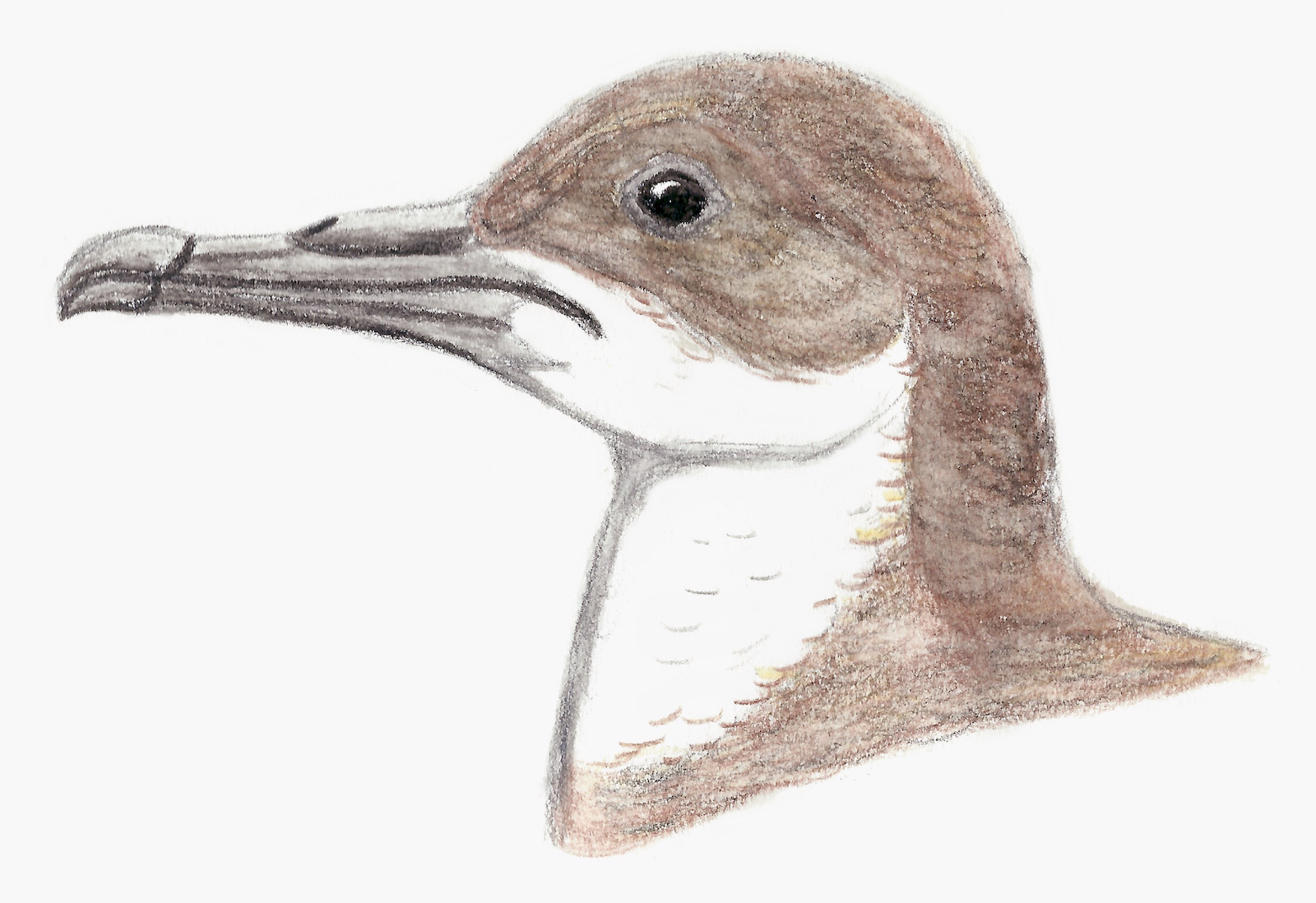
Life restoration, based on known material and extant Puffinus species.

The dune shearwater (Puffinus holeae), also known as the Canarian shearwater or Hole's shearwater, was a relatively large shearwater which bred in the Canary Islands archipelago of the North Atlantic Ocean. Fossils have also been found in the Figueira Brava cave archaeological site on the western coast of Portugal. The specific epithet honours Mrs Jean Hole, who collected fossil material of the species on the Jandia Peninsula of Fuerteventura. It was intermediate in size between the Manx and Cory's shearwaters. Its breeding colonies were in dune fields, in contrast to those of the smaller and sympatric lava shearwater which bred in lava fields. The species went extinct about 2000–3000 years ago, contemporaneously with the first human settlement of the islands by the Guanches, likely due to be human predation.
