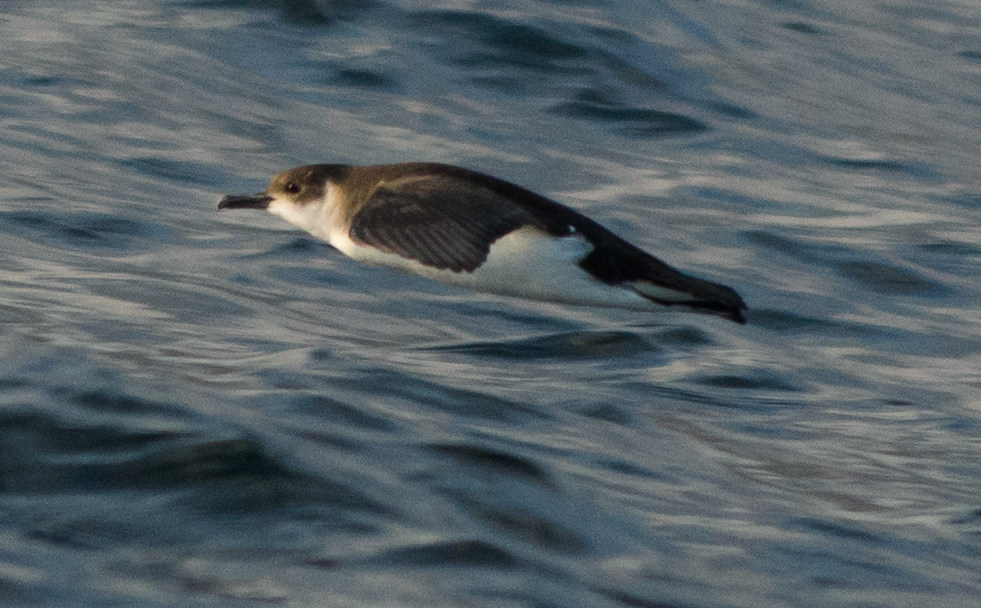

Scientific classification
- Kingdom: Animalia
- Phylum: Chordata
- Class: Aves
- Order: Procellariiformes
- Family: Procellariidae
- Genus: Puffinus
- Species: P. baroli

Binomial name
- Puffinus baroli (Bonaparte, 1857)

= Barolo shearwater =

Species of bird

The Barolo shearwater (Puffinus baroli), also known as the North Atlantic little shearwater or Macaronesian shearwater, is a small shearwater which breeds in the Azores and Canaries of Macaronesia in the North Atlantic Ocean. The English name and the specific baroli refers to Carlo Tencredi Falletti, marquis of Barolo.

== Taxonomy ==
Barolo shearwater was formally described in 1857 by the French naturalist Charles Lucien Bonaparte under the binomial name Procellaria baroli. The specific epithet commemorates Carlo Tencredi Falletti, marquis of Barolo. This shearwater is now placed in the genus Puffinus that was introduced by the French zoologist Mathurin Jacques Brisson in 1760 with the Manx shearwater (Puffinus puffinus) as the type species. The species in monotypic: no subspecies are recognised.

It was previously considered conspecific with the little shearwater (Puffinus assimilis) of the southern hemisphere. Mitochondrial DNA cytochrome b sequence analysis indicated that baroli and boydi were very close to the nominate subspecies of the Audubon's shearwater complex, now known as Sargasso shearwater (P. lherminieri). BirdLife International retain the forms baroli and boydi within little shearwater. The British Ornithologists' Union accepted P. baroli as a distinct species in 2005, as has Clements Checklist. The American Ornithologists' Union followed in 2013.

== Description ==
The Barolo shearwater is visually similar to the Manx shearwater and other North Atlantic Puffinus, but can be distinguished by features such as a pale face with a darkly contrasting eye, a silvery panel in the upperwings, shorter more rounded wings, and blue feet.

== Distribution ==
The Barolo shearwater breeds on the Azores, Desertas, Savage and Canary Islands. The largest colony, consisting of 1400 pairs, occurs on the Selvagen Islands. The non-breeding range is the tropical and sub-tropic northeast Atlantic.

== Behaviour ==
The Barolo shearwater feeds in the upper 15m of the water column, which is similar to the closely related Sargasso shearwater Puffinus lherminieri of the western Atlantic and Caribbean Sea. Barolo shearwaters do not have a preferred time of day to forage or rest and they may hunt for food during either day or night, although they seem to be more ready to fly in the daylight hours. They feed mainly on fish and cephalopods, with Argonauta argo being the most common cephalopod taken in the Azores, while the fish taken were almost exclusively from the genus Phycis.

== Threats ==
Like other Procellariforms, introduced predators, such as rats and cats, are their main threat at breeding colonies. In addition, fledglings are attracted to artificial lights at night during their maiden flights from nests to the sea. On Tenerife, in the Canary Islands, a decline on the number of birds attracted to lights have been reported, suggesting a population decline on the island.
