= List of procellariids =

The taxonomy of the Procellariidae, or procellariids, is complex and still a matter of some debate. The traditional taxonomy breaks the procellariids into four main groups, the fulmarine petrels, the prions, the gadfly petrels and the shearwaters. Recent studies have called this arrangement into question.

== Traditional taxonomy ==
This traditional taxonomy is based upon Carboneras (1992) in the Handbook of the Birds of the World.

Fulmarine petrels

- Macronectes
- Fulmarus
- Thalassoica
- Daption
- Pagodroma

Gadfly petrels

- Pterodroma

Prions

- Halobaena
- Pachyptila

Shearwaters

- Procellaria
- Calonectris
- Puffinus

== Revised taxonomy ==
Based on Austin (1996), Bretagnolle et al. (1998), Nunn & Stanley (1998) and Brooke (2004), several changes have been made from the more traditional taxonomy. The two species in the genus Bulweria are no longer considered close to the rest of the gadfly petrels; several more gadfly petrels are removed from Pterodroma and placed in Pseudobulweria (allied to the shearwaters), and the Kerguelen petrel is also removed from Pterodroma and placed in the monotypic Lugensa. Several taxa are also elevated to species status on the basis of newer studies.

Fulmarine petrels

- Macronectes
  - Macronectes halli, northern giant petrel
  - Macronectes giganteus, southern giant petrel
- Fulmarus
  - Fulmarus glacialis, northern fulmar
  - Fulmarus glacialoides, southern fulmar
- Thalassoica
  - Thalassoica antarctica, Antarctic petrel
- Daption
  - Daption capense, Cape petrel
- Pagodroma
  - Pagodroma nivea, snow petrel

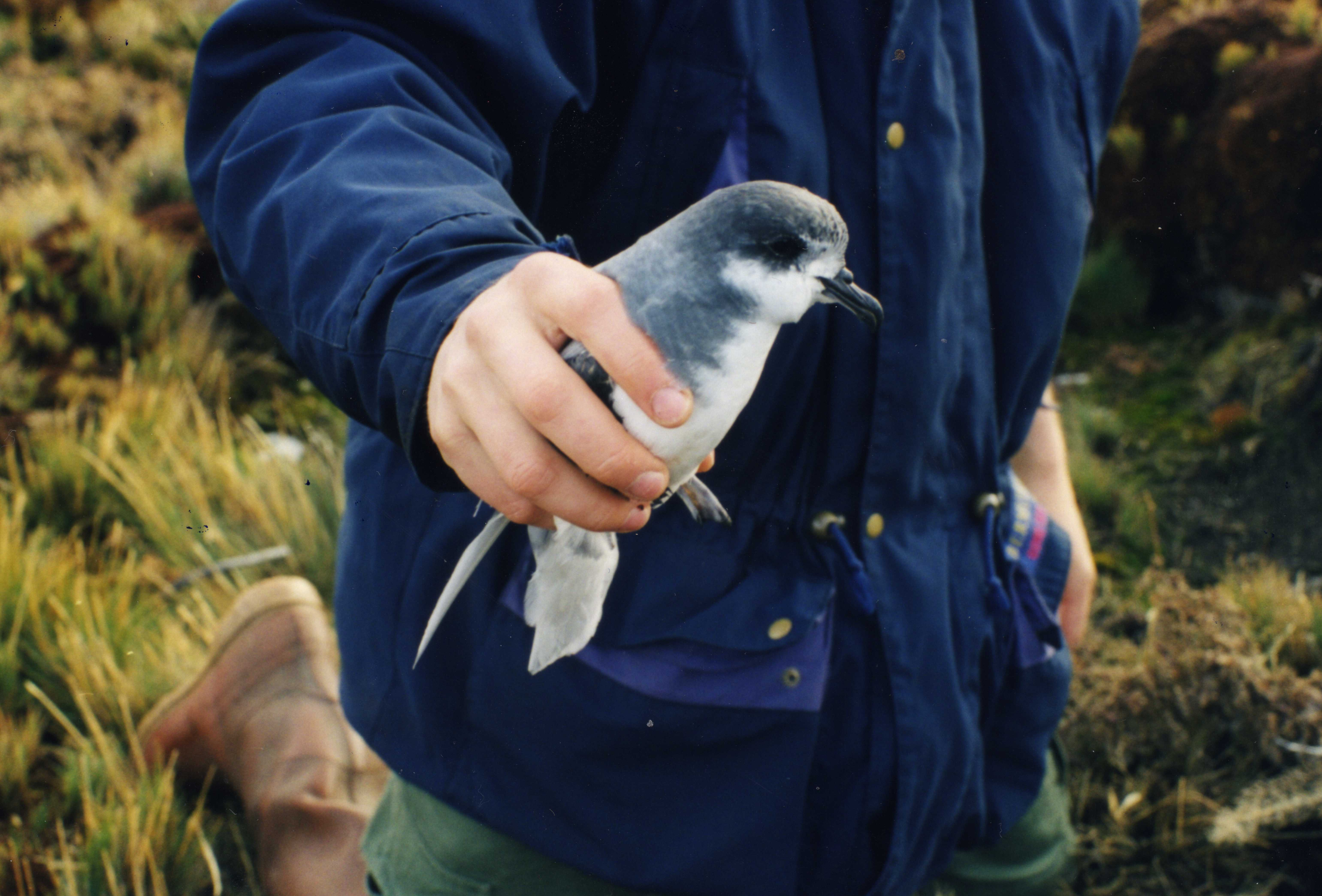
The blue petrel is related to the prions

Prions

- Pelecanoides
  - Pelecanoides garnotii, Peruvian diving-petrel
  - Pelecanoides magellani, Magellanic diving-petrel
  - Pelecanoides georgicus, South Georgia diving-petrel
  - Pelecanoides urinatrix, common diving-petrel
- Halobaena
  - Halobaena caerula, blue petrel
- Pachyptila
  - Pachyptila turtur, fairy prion
  - Pachyptila belcheri, slender-billed prion
  - Pachyptila crassirostris, fulmar prion
  - Pachyptila vittata, broad-billed prion
  - Pachyptila desolata, Antarctic prion
  - Pachyptila salvin, Salvin's prion

Procellarine petrels

- Procellaria
  - Procellaria aequinoctialis, white-chinned petrel
  - Procellaria conspicillata, spectacled petrel
  - Procellaria westlandica, Westland petrel
  - Procellaria parkinsoni, black petrel
  - Procellaria cinerea, grey petrel
- Bulweria
  - Bulweria bulwerii, Bulwer's petrel
  - Bulweria fallax, Jouanin's petrel
  - †Bulweria bifax, small Saint Helena petrel (extinct)

Shearwaters

- Calonectris
  - Calonectris borealis, Cory's shearwater
  - Calonectris diomedea, Scopoli's shearwater
  - Calonectris edwardsii, Cape Verde shearwater
  - Calonectris leucomelas, streaked shearwater
- Puffinus
- (Sub)Genus Puffinus ("Puffinus" group) - smaller species, closely related to Calonectris
  - Puffinus nativatis, Christmas shearwater
  - Puffinus subalaris, Galápagos shearwater
  - Puffinus gavia, fluttering shearwater
  - Puffinus huttoni, Hutton's shearwater
  - Puffinus yelkouan, yelkouan shearwater
  - Puffinus mauretanicus, Balearic shearwater
  - Puffinus assimilis, little shearwater
  - Puffinus heinrothi, Heinroth's shearwater
  - Puffinus lherminieri, Audubon's shearwater
    - Puffinus (lherminieri) baroli, North Atlantic little shearwater
    - Puffinus (lherminieri) persicus, Persian shearwater
    - Puffinus (lherminieri) bailloni, tropical shearwater or Baillon's shearwater
    - Puffinus (lherminieri) bannermani, Bannerman's shearwater
  - Puffinus puffinus, Manx shearwater
  - Puffinus opisthomelas, black-vented shearwater
  - Puffinus auricularis, Townsend's shearwater
  - Puffinus newelli, Hawaiian shearwater
  - †Puffinus parvus, Bermuda shearwater (extinct)

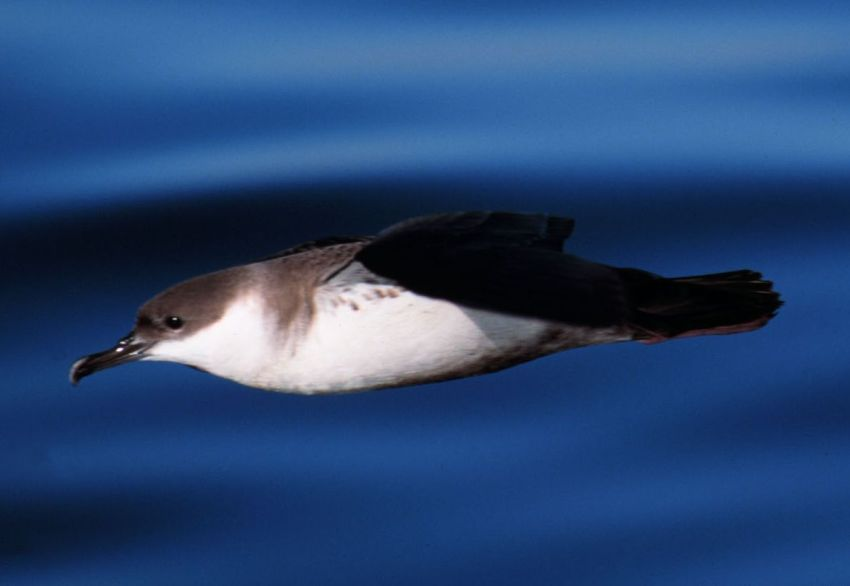
Great shearwaters belong to the "Neonectris" group of their genus

- (Sub)Genus Ardenna ("Neonectris" group) - larger species, a distinct lineage
  - Puffinus creatopus, pink-footed shearwater
  - Puffinus carneipes, flesh-footed shearwater
  - Puffinus gravis, great shearwater
  - Puffinus griseus, sooty shearwater
  - Puffinus tenuirostris, short-tailed shearwater
  - Puffinus pacificus, wedge-tailed shearwater
  - Puffinus bulleri, Buller's shearwater
- Pseudobulweria
  - Puffinus macgillivrayi, Fiji petrel
  - Puffinus rostrata, Tahiti petrel
  - Puffinus becki, Beck's petrel
  - Puffinus aterrima, Mascarene petrel
  - †Puffinus rupinarus, large Saint Helena petrel (extinct)
- Aphrodroma
  - Aphrodroma brevirostris, Kerguelen petrel

Gadfly petrels

- Pterodroma
  - Pterodroma baraui, Barau's petrel
  - Pterodroma arminjoniana, Trindade petrel
    - Pterodroma (arminjoniana) heraldica, herald petrel
  - Pterodroma externa, Juan Fernandez petrel
  - Pterodroma neglecta, Kermadec petrel
  - Pterodroma phaeopygia, Galapagos petrel
  - Pterodroma sandwichensis, Hawaiian petrel
  - Pterodroma atrata, Henderson petrel
  - Pterodroma alba, Phoenix petrel
  - Pterodroma feae, Fea's petrel
  - Pterodroma madeira, Zino's petrel or Madeira petrel
  - Pterodroma mollis, soft-plumaged petrel
  - Pterodroma cahow, Bermuda petrel
  - Pterodroma hasitata, black-capped petrel
  - †Pterodroma caribbaea, Jamaica petrel (probably extinct)
  - Pterodroma incerta, Atlantic petrel
  - Pterodroma lessonii, white-headed petrel
  - Pterodroma magentae, magenta petrel
  - Pterodroma macroptera, great-winged petrel
  - Pterodroma solandri, providence petrel
  - Pterodroma ultima, Murphy's petrel
  - Pterodroma inexpectata, mottled petrel
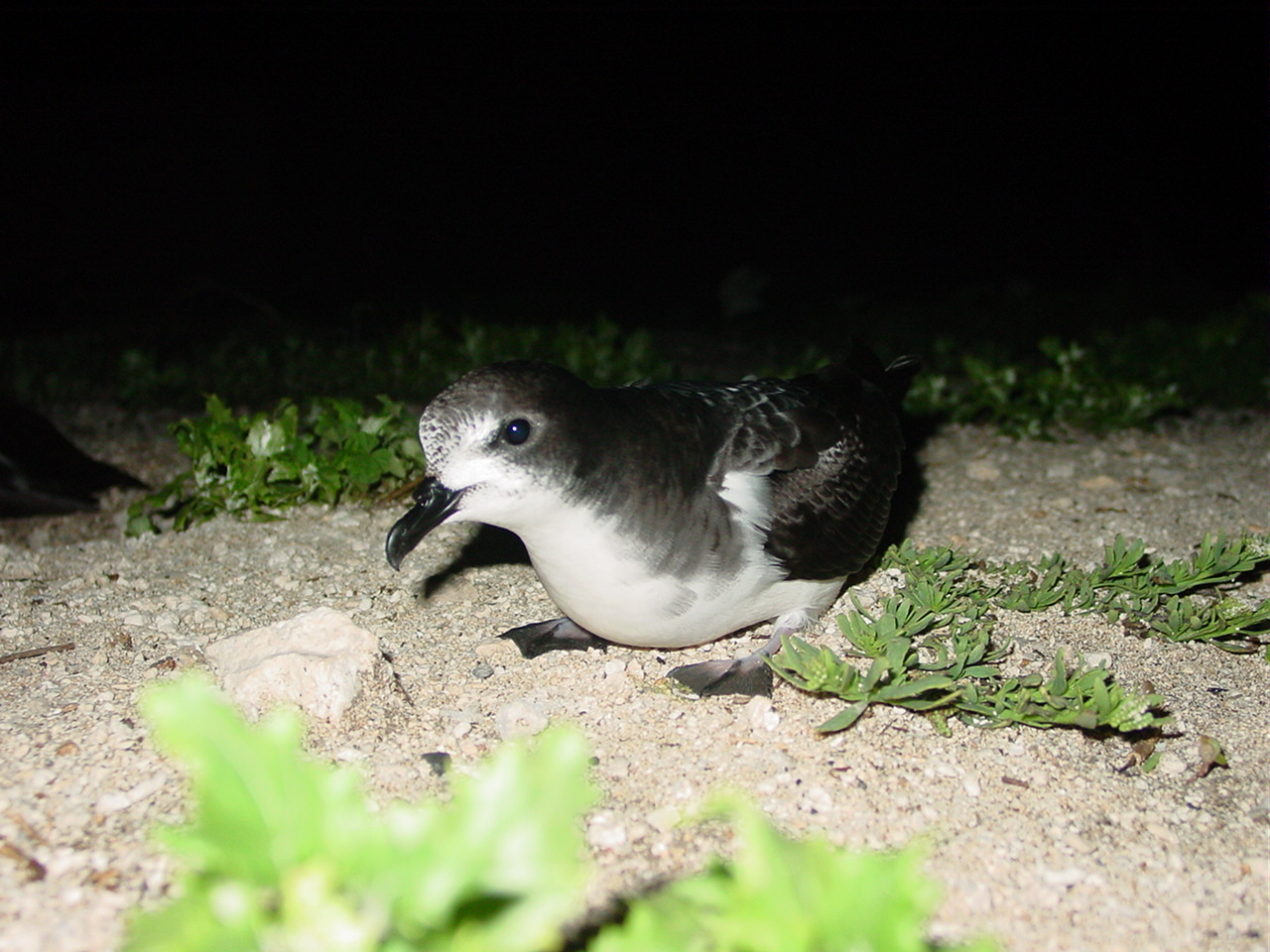
    Bonin petrel, a small gadfly petrel
  - Pterodroma pycrofti, Pycroft's petrel
  - Pterodroma longirostris, Stejneger's petrel
  - Pterodroma brevipes, collared petrel
  - Pterodroma leucoptera, Gould's petrel
  - †Pterodroma cf. leucoptera, Mangareva petrel (possibly extinct)
  - Pterodroma cookii, Cook's petrel
  - Pterodroma defilippiana, Masatierra petrel
  - Pterodroma hypoleuca, Bonin petrel
  - Pterodroma cervicalis, white-necked petrel
  - Pterodroma occulta, Vanuatu petrel
  - Pterodroma nigripennis, black-winged petrel
  - Pterodroma axillaris, Chatham petrel

An undescribed prehistorically extinct species was found on Easter Island. For other non-Recent extinctions, see the genus accounts.
