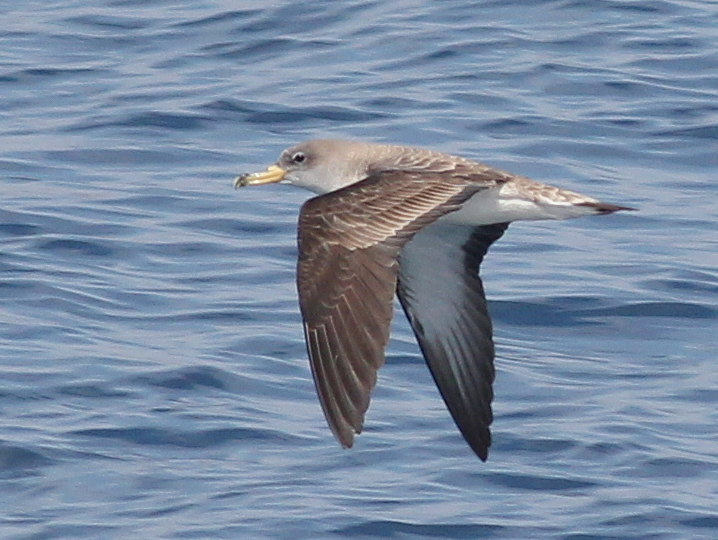

Conservation status
- Least Concern (IUCN 3.1)

Scientific classification
- Kingdom: Animalia
- Phylum: Chordata
- Class: Aves
- Order: Procellariiformes
- Family: Procellariidae
- Genus: Calonectris
- Species: C. diomedea

Binomial name
- Calonectris diomedea (Scopoli, 1769)

= Scopoli's shearwater =

Species of bird

Scopoli's shearwater (Calonectris diomedea) is a seabird in the petrel family Procellariidae. It breeds on rocky islands and on steep coasts in the Mediterranean but outside the breeding season it forages in the Atlantic. It is brownish grey above with darker wings and mostly white below. The bill is pale yellow with a dark patch near the tip. The sexes are alike. It was formerly considered to be conspecific with Cory's shearwater.

== Taxonomy ==
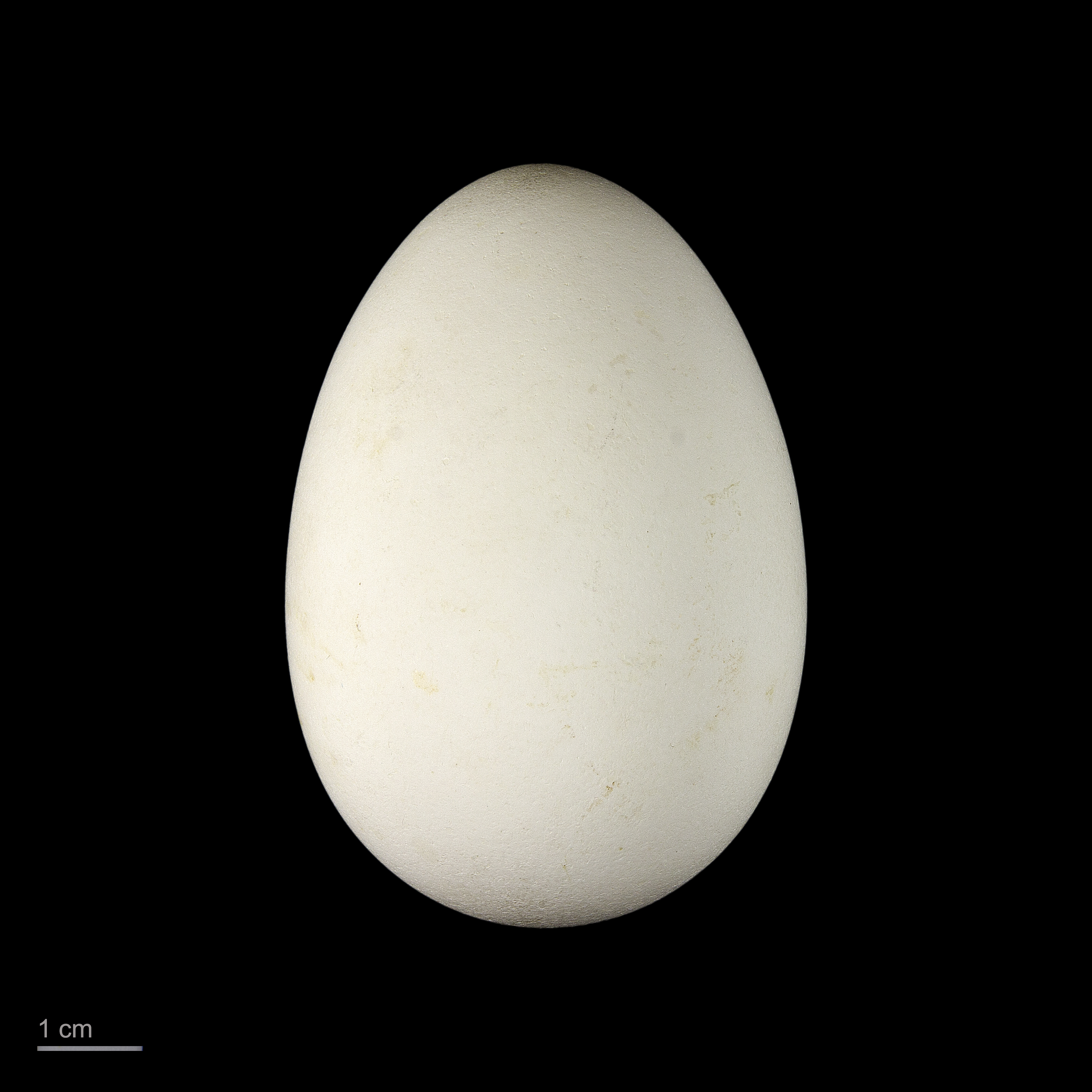
Egg

Scopoli's shearwater was formally described in 1769 by the Italian naturalist Giovanni Antonio Scopoli. He placed it with the other petrels in the genus Procellaria and coined the binomial name Procellaria diomedea. Scopoli did not mention a type locality but this was designated in 1946 by the British Ornithologists' Union as the Tremiti Islands in the Adriatic. Scopoli's shearwater is now placed in the genus Calonectris that was introduced in 1915 by the ornithologists Gregory Mathews and Tom Iredale. The genus name combines the Ancient Greek kalos meaning "good" or "noble" with the genus name Nectris that was used for shearwaters by the German naturalist Heinrich Kuhl in 1820. The name Nectris comes from the Ancient Greek nēktris meaning "swimmer". The specific epithet diomedea refers to Diomedes, a hero in Greek mythology. His wife was serially unfaithful while he fought at Troy, so he left to found a city in Italy. After his death, his distraught friends were turned into white seabirds. The species is considered to be monotypic: no subspecies are recognised.

Scopoli's shearwater and Cory's shearwater were previously considered as conspecific. They formed the Cory's shearwater complex (Calonectris diomedea). Based on the lack of hybridization and differences in mitochondrial DNA, morphology and vocalization, the complex was split into two separate species. The English name "Cory's shearwater" was transferred to Calonectris borealis while what was previously the nominate subspecies became Scopoli's shearwater (Calonectris diomedea).

Most ornithological authorities treat Cory's shearwater and Scopoli's shearwater as separate species. Including the Cornell Laboratory of Ornithology as of their October 2025 update to The Clements Checklist of Birds of the World.

== Description ==
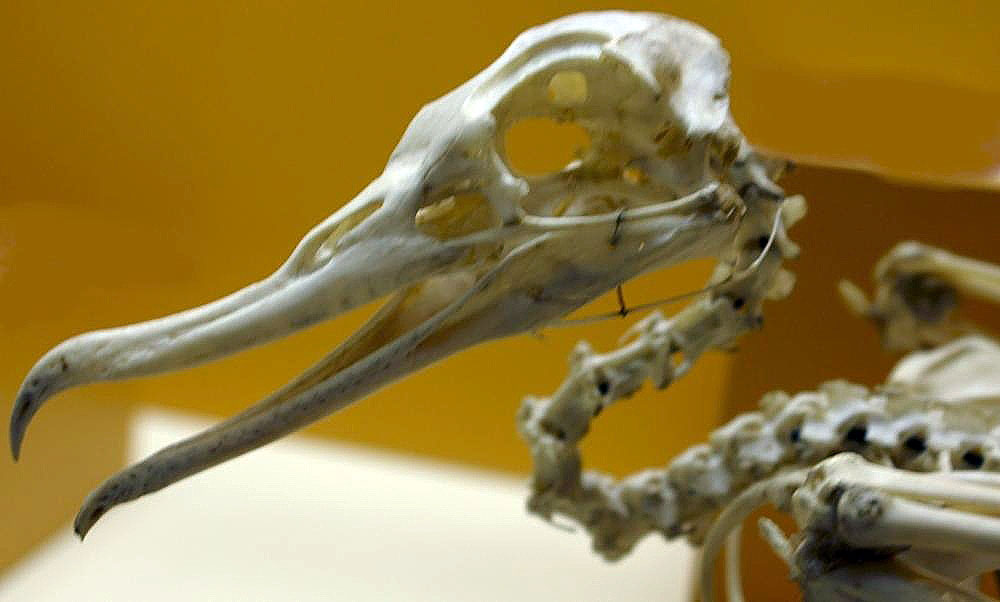
Skull of a Scopoli's shearwater

Scopoli's shearwater is 45–52 cm (18–20 in) in overall length with a wingspan of 112–122 cm (44–48 in). The upperparts are brownish-grey with most feathers fringed with a lighter brown. The wings are a darker brown. The upper tail-coverts are tipped whitish and the tail is dark brown. The underparts are mostly white with a brown border which is most prominent of the trailing edge of the wing. The bill is pale yellow with a dark patch near the tip. The legs and feet are a pale flesh colour. The sexes are similar in appearance but the male is on average slightly larger than the female.

The appearance is very similar to Cory's shearwater and the two species can be difficult to distinguish. The underside of the wing of Scopoli's shearwater has more white on the primary feathers at the wingtip, in particular the outermost large feather (P10). The Cape Verde shearwater is smaller and is significantly darker above.

== Distribution and habitat ==
Scopoli's shearwater breeds on islands in the Mediterranean from the Chafarinas Islands off the Moroccan coast in the west to the Dodecanese (Greek islands) in the east. The largest colony is on the rocky island of Zembra, 13 km (8.1 mi) off the Tunisian coast. The colony contains between 141,000 and 223,000 breeding pairs which represents more than 75 percent of the global population. Other large colonies are on the island of Linosa in the Strait of Sicily, and on the Balearic Islands.

At the end of October, after the breeding season, Scopoli's shearwaters migrate to the Atlantic and stream out of the Mediterranean through the Strait of Gibraltar. They return to the Mediterranean at the end of February. Studies using light level geolocators have found that birds tagged either on the island of Linosa or on the Pantaleu islet in the Balearic Islands wintered in regions associated with major upwellings in the south east Atlantic. The birds either foraged off the coast of West Africa in the upwelling associated with the Canary Current or continued further south and foraged in the Benguela Current off the coast of Namibia.

== Food and feeding ==
Scopoli's shearwater mainly feeds on small fish, but it also consumes cephalopods and crustacean. It feeds by skimming over the surface or by surface feeding but only rarely plunges completely beneath the surface. Sometimes it will follow whales and tuna to pick up food scraps and to catch small fish driven to the surface. It will also scavenge discards from fishing vessels.
