= Calonectris krantzi =

Calonectris krantzi Temporal range: Early Pliocene

Scientific classification
- Kingdom: Animalia
- Phylum: Chordata
- Class: Aves
- Order: Procellariiformes
- Family: Procellariidae
- Genus: Calonectris
- Species: C. krantzi

Binomial name
- Calonectris krantzi Olson & Rasmussen, 2001

Extinct species of bird

Calonectris krantzi is an extinct species of shearwater in the genus Calonectris. C. krantzi lived during the Zanclean stage of the Pliocene epoch of North America.

== Distribution ==
Calonectris krantzi is known from the Yorktown Formation of North Carolina.
