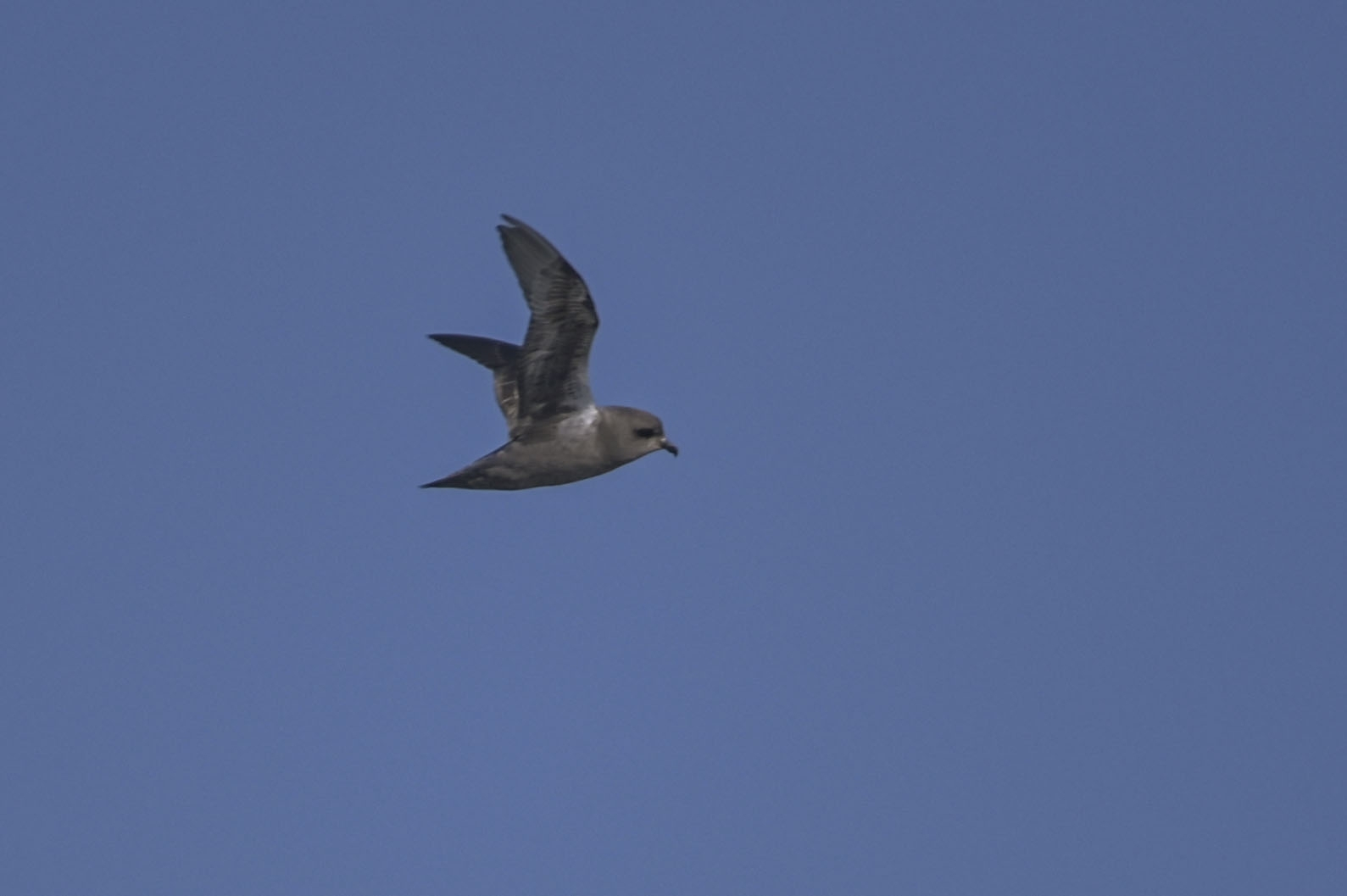

Conservation status
- Least Concern (IUCN 3.1)

Scientific classification
- Kingdom: Animalia
- Phylum: Chordata
- Class: Aves
- Order: Procellariiformes
- Family: Procellariidae
- Genus: Aphrodroma; Olson, 2000
- Species: A. brevirostris

Binomial name
- Aphrodroma brevirostris (Lesson, 1831)

Synonyms
- Pterodroma brevirostris Lugensa brevirostris

= Kerguelen petrel =

Species of bird

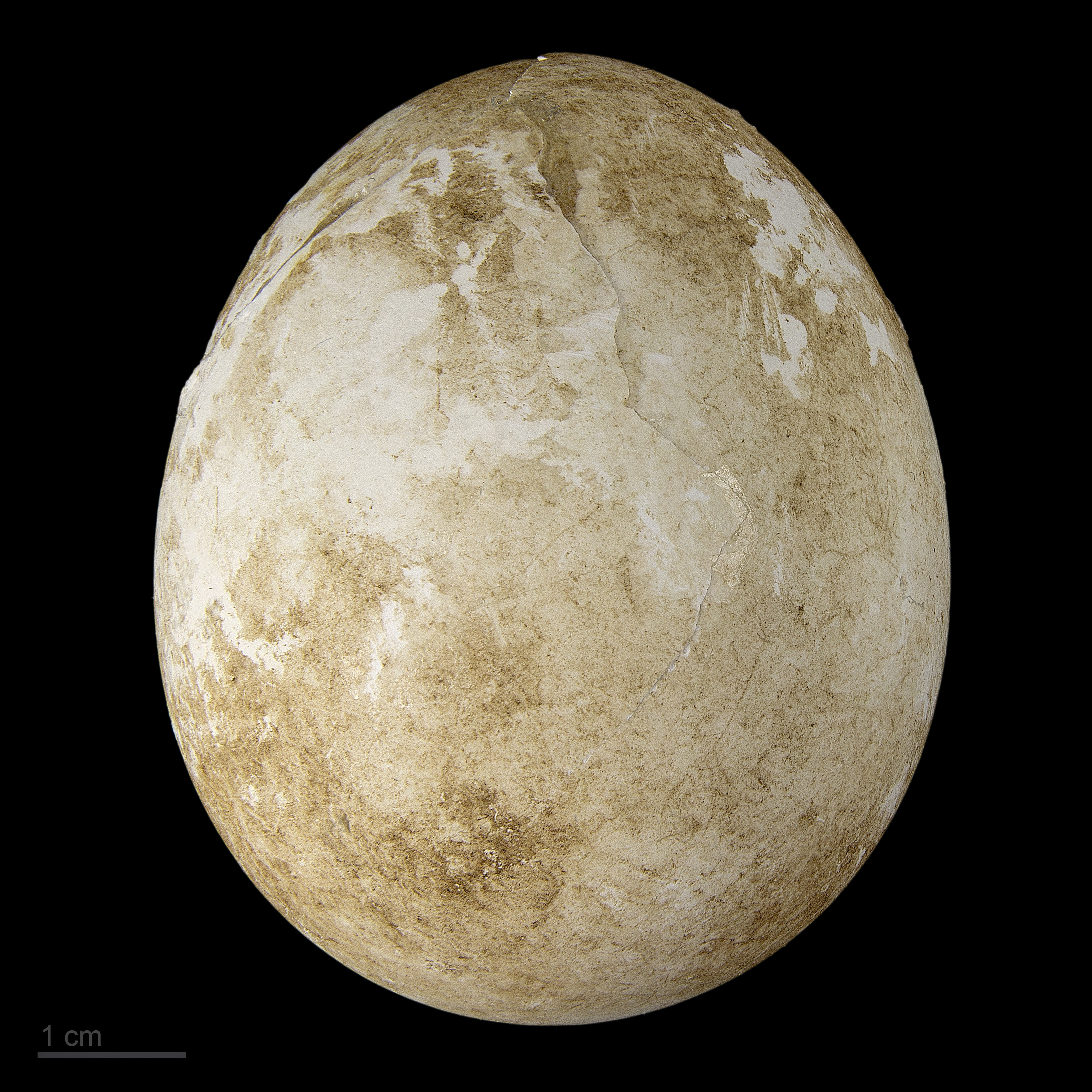
Aphrodroma brevirostris - MHNT

The Kerguelen petrel (Aphrodroma brevirostris) is a small (36 cm long) slate-grey seabird in the family Procellariidae. It is the only species placed in the genus Aphrodroma. It is a pelagic, circumpolar seabird of the Southern Ocean. It breeds on islands in the southern Atlantic and Indian Oceans.

== Taxonomy ==
The Kerguelen petrel was formally described in 1831 by the French naturalist René Lesson. He placed it in the genus Procellaria that had been erected for the petrels by Carl Linnaeus in 1758 and coined the binomial name Procellaria brevirostris. The Kerguelen petrel was formerly included with the gadfly petrels in the genus Pterodroma and later in the monotypic genre Lugensa but is now placed in the genus Aphrodroma that was introduced for the Kerguelen petrel by Storrs L. Olson in 2000. The name Aphrodroma combines the Ancient Greek aphros meaning "sea foam" with -dromos meaning "-racer".The specific epithet brevirostris is from the Latin brevis meaning "short" and -rostris meaning "-billed". The species is monotypic: no subspecies are recognised.

== Breeding ==
Kerguelen petrels breed colonially on remote islands; colonies are present on Gough Island in the Atlantic Ocean, and Marion Island, Prince Edward Island, Crozet Islands and Kerguelen Island in the Indian Ocean. The species attends its colonies nocturnally, breeding in burrows in wet soil. The burrows usually face away from the prevailing wind. A single egg is laid per breeding season; the egg is unusually round for the family. The egg is incubated by both parents for 49 days. After hatching the chick fledges after 60 days.
