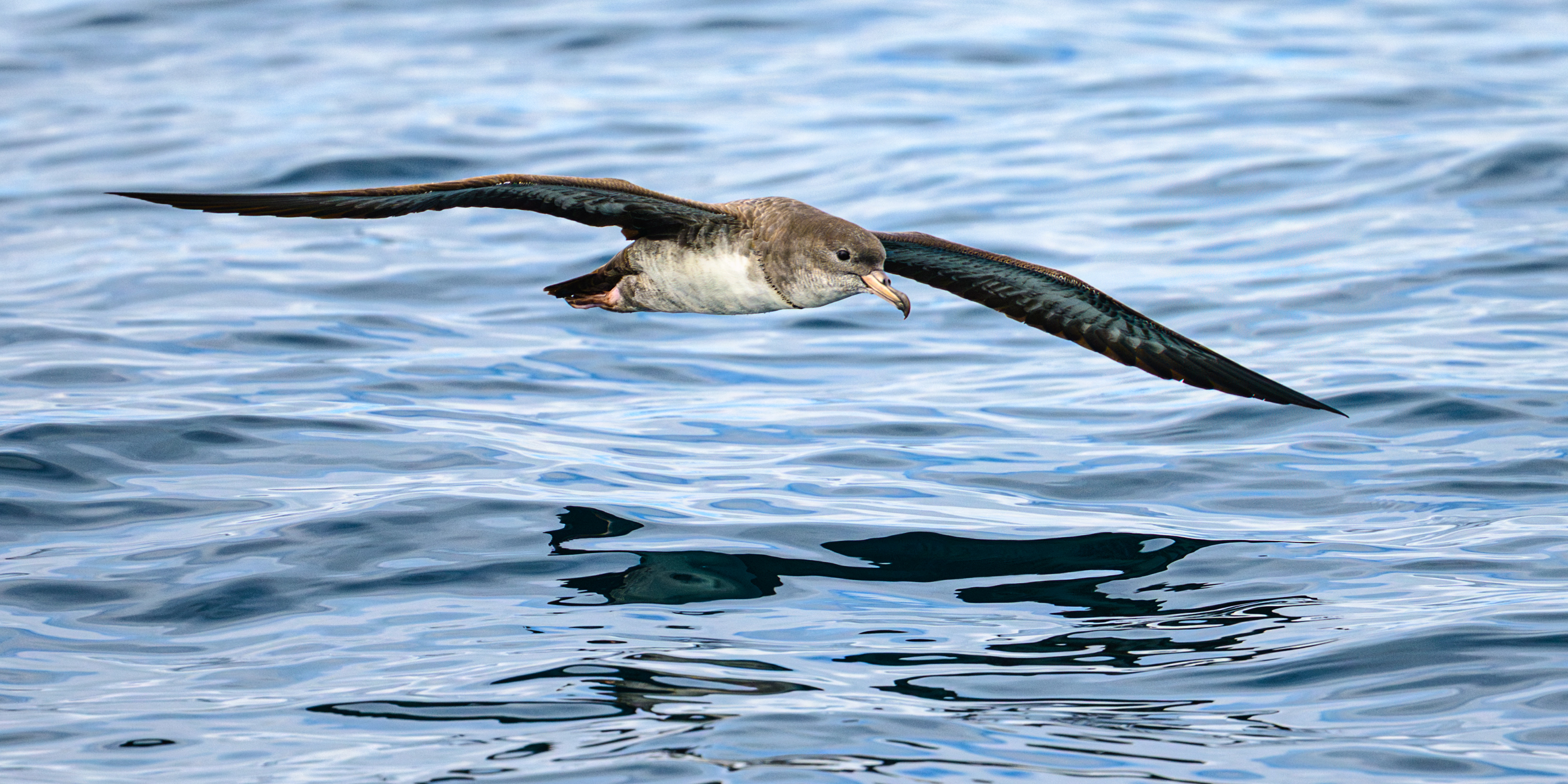

Conservation status
- Vulnerable (IUCN 3.1)

Scientific classification
- Kingdom: Animalia
- Phylum: Chordata
- Class: Aves
- Order: Procellariiformes
- Family: Procellariidae
- Genus: Ardenna
- Species: A. creatopus

Binomial name
- Ardenna creatopus (Coues, 1864)

= Pink-footed shearwater =

Species of bird

The pink-footed shearwater (Ardenna creatopus) is a species of seabird. The bird is 48 cm (19 in) in length, with a 109 cm (43 in) wingspan. It is polymorphic, having both darker- and lighter-phase populations. Together with the equally light-billed flesh-footed shearwater, it forms the Hemipuffinus group, a superspecies that may or may not have an Atlantic relative in the great shearwater. These are large shearwaters which are among those that could be separated in the genus Ardenna.

A molecular phylogenetic study published in 2021 found very little genetic difference between the pink-footed shearwater and the flesh-footed shearwater (Ardenna carneipes). The authors of the study suggested that these two taxa might be better considered as conspecific.

This species is pelagic, occurring in the Pacific Ocean. It predominantly nests on offshore islands off Chile, i.e. Mocha Island. It is a transequatorial migrant, moving toward subarctic waters of the Pacific after raising its young. It is fairly common well off the West Coast of the United States during the country's warmer months.

The pink-footed shearwater feeds on mainly fish, squid, and crustaceans.

This bird nests in burrows, preferring forested slopes. It is a colonial nester.

Numbers of this shearwater have been reduced due to predation by introduced species, such as rats and cats. Some loss of birds also occurs from becoming entangled in fishing gear. The pink-footed shearwater is one of the species to which the Agreement on the Conservation of Albatrosses and Petrels applies.

== Taxonomy and systematics ==
=== Evolution ===
Pink-footed shearwaters are in the order procellariiformes which are a monophyletic group of seabirds. While some studies propose that based on the fossil record the Ardenna shearwaters originate from the North Atlantic region, other studies suggest that this group had a South Australia-New Zealand origin. Since shearwaters are known long-distance migrants, this suggests that related extinct taxa may have also been long-distance migrants, and that fossils found in the North Atlantic were likely from birds that died during the non-breeding period after migrating from the Southern Australia-New Zealand region,

Studies suggest that since shearwater dispersal is highly tied to accessibility to foraging areas, and ocean currents and wind patterns influence marine productivity and foraging ranges, they may be important factors that influenced speciation in this group of seabirds. Specifically, during the Pleistocene and Pliocene when global sea-level changes and oscillations were occurring, neritic waters, which are important foraging grounds for shearwaters, experienced a reduction. This reduction is hypothesized to have led to a spike in the extinction rate of megafauna associated with coastal habitats. Following this, climatic shifts that may have prompted geographic splitting leading to bottlenecks, resulted in an increase in speciation events and large scale dispersal of shearwaters, resulting in a high level of diversification in this group.

=== Related species ===
The pink-footed shearwater is closely related to the flesh-footed shearwater. However, while the pink-footed shearwater plumage is typically a combination of gray and brown on the upperparts and white underparts, the flesh-footed shearwater has entirely dark plumage. Some scientists consider the pink-footed shearwater to be a southern version of the flesh-footed shearwater, but overall they are largely considered, by the American Ornithologists Union, to be two separate species and close enough to be super-species.

=== Alternate and past names ===
Alternate common names for the pink-footed shearwater (Ardenna creatopus creatopus) include their common name in French: "Puffin à pieds roses" and in Spanish: "Fardela Blanca" or "Fardela de Vientre Blanco". Pink-footed shearwaters were previously considered part of the genus Puffinus, but following genetic assessment, are now classified under the genus Ardenna. Therefore, past names also include Puffinus creatopus.

== Description ==
=== Identification ===
Male pink-footed shearwaters on average are found to be larger than females. However, morphological features such as bill size, tail length, head length, and average body size are found to be linked not only to sex, but to breeding locality. These difference may represent adaptations to environmental conditions such as food availability, prey type/mobility and wind speed. In procellariiformes, larger wing area is generally associated with feeding on highly mobile prey, lower wind speeds, and less abundant more dispersed food sources. Therefore, differences in size observed between pink-footed shearwaters at different breeding locations may be representative of not only sex, but colony specific differences in foraging. For vocalizations, pink-footed shearwaters are not particularly vocal birds, but may produce a horse-like whinny when feeding.

=== Plumage ===
The pink-footed shearwater has sooty-brown upperparts and white underparts. The bill is typically pale pink with a dark tip, and the legs are pink. Pink-footed shearwaters have plumage that is always rather dull, with little colour variation and a distinctly pink bill, when compared to similar looking species such as the black-vented shearwater.

=== Moult ===
No studies have been conducted on Pink-footed shearwater moult patterns specifically, however, there have been studies on the moult patters of other Ardenna shearwaters. Winter moult in shearwaters tends to occur in areas with high productivity, where food availability is high. Ardenna shearwaters show a trend where the moult has an ascending pattern, starting at the inner primaries and finishing with the outer primaries. However, specific moult timing or pattern cannot be estimated without a proper species-specific study. Foraging ranges can become constrained during moult and species which occupy a similar trophic niche might evolve different moult timing to reduce interspecific competition where food availability is limited.

== Distribution and habitat ==
Pink-footed shearwaters breed off the coast of Chile on the islands of the Juan Fernandez Archipelago and on Isla Mocha. During the non-breeding season they migrate north in the eastern Pacific Ocean where they spend the non-breeding season between Northern and Southern Peru, or off North America at sites ranging from Southern California to Vancouver. Pink-footed shearwaters perform trans-equatorial migrations of 11 000 km, with some individuals travelling up to 31 000 km in total from their breeding sites in Chile. Birds use coastal and pelagic waters as stop-over sites during migration, and exploit continental shelf and slope habitats during the non-breeding season.

== Behaviour and ecology ==
=== Breeding ===
The breeding behaviour of the pink-footed shearwater is poorly known, however other Procellriiformes are socially monogamous and form long-lasting pair bonds, typically only switching partners if they have experienced an unsuccessful breeding attempt. This suggests pink-footed shearwaters are likely similar. Other procellariiformes establish pairs through breeding displays, with elaborate visual displays in diurnal species and auditory displays in nocturnal species, Pink-footed shearwaters are mainly active at night from dusk to just before dawn. There are no current recordings of elaborate breeding displays in pink-footed shearwaters, however, partners have been observed resting together inside their burrow, where they softly call in duet and preen each-other's head and neck.

=== Feeding ecology ===
Pink-footed shearwaters have a strong preference for feeding close to the mainland coast which is likely a reflection of both oceanographic conditions and food availability. Potentially this is tied to the pink-footed shearwaters preference for high salinity waters with surface temperatures that range between 14 and 18 degrees Celsius. Foraging sites coincide with areas of high abundance of their primary prey species, anchovies and sardines, Further, pink-footed shearwaters have been shown to make long feeding trips of one to two weeks. Pelagic seabirds that breed in the southern hemisphere show a trend where birds exhibit a dual foraging strategy consisting of alternating short and long foraging trips. This is thought to be a compromise between providing the regular feedings needed by a chick, and the requirements of the adult to maintain their body condition by foraging in highly productive waters. However, few studies have been conducted concerning the movement ecology of pink-footed shearwaters, documenting their foraging behaviour.

=== Threats and survival ===
The IUCN Red List assessment designates the pink-footed shearwater as vulnerable due to its limited breeding range which leaves it susceptible to stochastic events and human impacts. In Canada, COSEWIC considers the pink-footed shearwater endangered due to the significant declines experienced by the species as a result of nest predation, human impacts such as fisheries bycatch, and habitat degradation.

==== Fisheries ====
Fisheries bycatch is an ongoing threat to pink-footed shearwaters with especially high rates of over 1500 observed mortalities between the years 2015 and 2017 at purse-seine fisheries in Chile. Fisheries bycatch is estimated to account for the mortality of more than 1000 adults a year. Bycatch occurs when birds become trapped accidentally in nets as they are being hauled in, leading to drowning or trauma, and high mortality levels appear to be linked primarily with sardine, anchovy and mackerel fisheries. Likely because sardine and anchovy are important prey species for pink-footed shearwaters, and fishing activities concentrate prey. This suggests that studies which focus on better understanding how pink-footed shearwater distribution and Chilean fisheries overlap could be integral in informing conservation through bycatch mitigation. Currently some studies have been done to indicate where the zones of overlap are, and they indicate extensive overlap of pink-footed shearwater habitat use and purse-seine fisheries that target sardine and anchovy. Hotspots of overlap between industrial purse-seine fisheries and shearwater habitat include a key foraging habitat of pink-footed shearwaters located north of Valdivia, Chile and one offshore of Talcahuano and Concepción. However, pink-footed shearwater bycatch data is not currently publicly available, which would be crucial in understanding the magnitude of threats to pink-footed shearwaters.

==== Contaminants ====
As coastal birds occupy high trophic levels, they tend to accumulate persistent chemicals such as mercury and organochlorides (PCBs, DDT, HCB, HCH, and PCP). As a result they can be used as bioindicators of local environmental pollution because they respond rapidly to contamination events. Female seabirds, which ingest large quantities of food in order to lay eggs, deposit the associated contaminants bound to the fats and proteins from their prey in their eggs. Therefore, the eggs of pink-footed shearwaters, which feed in coastal environments, can be used as an indicator of environmental contamination. Mercury, PCB, DDT, and OHa have all been found in high levels in pink-footed shearwater eggs suggesting that they likely experience burdens associated with exposure to these chemicals. Further, they help to show how these chemicals may be distributed along the migratory and breeding grounds of the Chilean Pacific coast and North Pacific waters.

==== Introduced species ====
As pink-footed shearwaters have a small breeding range, breeding off the coast of Chile on the islands of the Juan Fernandez Archipelago and on Isla Mocha only, they breed in a highly vulnerable island ecosystem. Alien species pose a threat to seabird populations as juvenile recruitment is significantly negatively impacted by the presence of these species. Seabirds, such as the pink-footed shearwater, which use restricted island breeding grounds are particularly susceptible to the negative impacts of alien species. In the Juan Fernandez Archipelago, pink-footed shearwaters interact with several introduced species, such as cats, dogs, rats, cattle, coati, mice and European rabbits. Notably, links have been found between pink-footed shearwater burrow occupancy and European rabbit presence. They found that the presence of rabbits significantly decreased burrow occupancy, likely as a result of interference competition whereby rabbits exploiting available habitat decreasing the availability of breeding habitat for pink-footed shearwaters. More research is needed on the effects of other introduced species such as rats, cats and dogs, but it is suggested that they likely increase nest predation. There is documented evidence and observations of cats, rats and dogs entering the burrows of pink-footed shearwaters, and these introduced species have been recorded predating the nests of other seabirds. Furthermore, coati have been observed killing pink-footed shearwaters. Suggesting pink-footed shearwaters are highly vulnerable to the effects of introduced species.

==== Chick harvesting ====
Chick harvesting poses another threat to pink-footed shearwater populations. On Isla Mocha, the local community has been harvesting chicks since the 1930s. Although this practice is now illegal, enforcement has been difficult, which poses another threat to breeding pink-footed shearwaters, as they typically only lay a single egg a year.

== Cultural and Human Relationships ==
Chick harvesting has been a tradition inside the local fishing community living on Isla Mocha since the 1930s. Although illegal, enforcement has been difficult and conservation efforts have had to turn to other approaches. Outreach and education have become the primary strategy for reducing chick harvesting on Isla Mocha. Shifting away from the tradition of harvesting, and towards an appreciation for the unique species that breeds on their island. The goal is to establish a sense of identity between the local community and the pink-footed shearwater, so that the community will choose to protect this species. This is being done using local values and styles of communication, and is led by a local Mochano (person from Isla Mocha).
