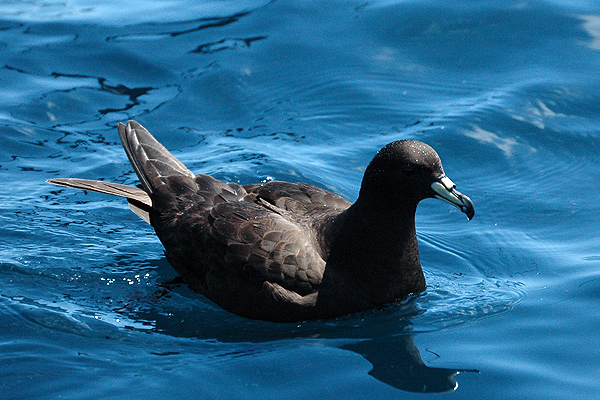

Conservation status
- Vulnerable (IUCN 3.1)

Scientific classification
- Kingdom: Animalia
- Phylum: Chordata
- Class: Aves
- Order: Procellariiformes
- Family: Procellariidae
- Genus: Procellaria
- Species: P. parkinsoni

Binomial name
- Procellaria parkinsoni Gray, 1862

Synonyms
- Majaqueus parkinsoni

= Black petrel =

Species of bird

The black petrel (Procellaria parkinsoni), (Māori: tāiko, or tākoketai) also called Parkinson's petrel, is a medium-sized, black-plumaged petrel, the smallest of the Procellaria. The species is an endemic breeder of New Zealand, breeding only on Great Barrier Island and Little Barrier Island, off the North Island. At sea it disperses as far as Australia and Ecuador.

== Taxonomy ==
The black petrel was formally described in 1862 by the English zoologist George Robert Gray in a list of birds from New Zealand. He coined the binomial name Procellaria parkinsoni. The genus name is from the Latin procella meaning "storm" or "gale". The specific epithet parkinsoni was chosen to honour the artist and collector Sydney Parkinson. The species is considered to be monotypic: no subspecies are recognised.

== Description ==
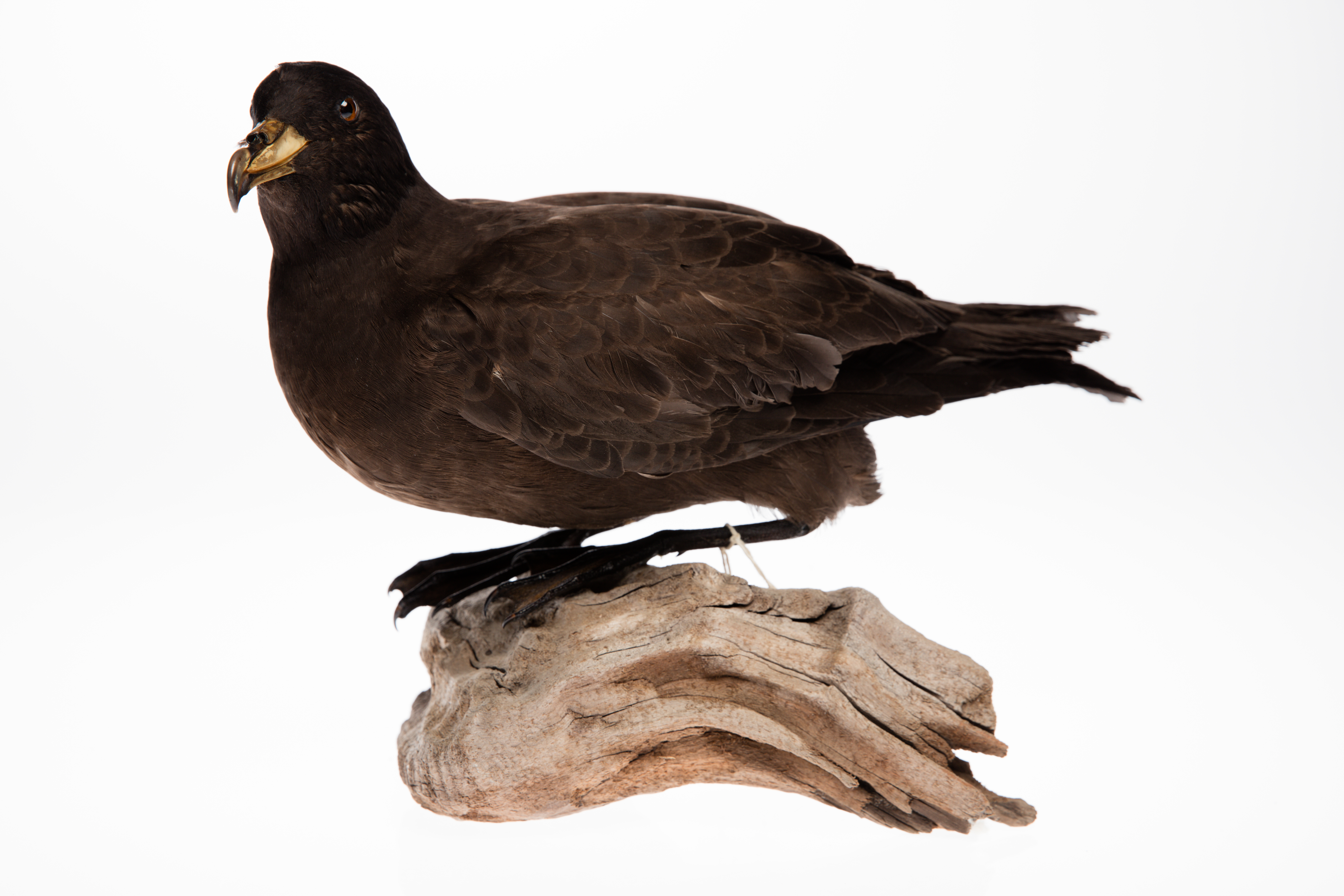
Black petrel mount from the collection of Auckland Museum

The plumage of the black petrel is all black, as are its legs and bill except for pale sections on the bill. It is a medium-sized petrel: males average about 720 g (25 oz), females around 680 g (24 oz). It has an overall length of 46 cm (18 in) and a wingspan averaging 115 cm (45 in).

== Distribution ==
It is endemic to New Zealand. It was previously found throughout the North Island and Northwest Nelson in the South Island, but predators (feral cats, pigs) caused their extinction on the mainland from about the 1950s. It is often seen in the outer Hauraki Gulf from October to May. Breeding is now restricted to the main colony on Great Barrier Island (c. 5000 birds over summer, including approximately 1300 breeding pairs and 1000 "pre-breeders" seeking mates) and a small colony of c. 250 birds on Little Barrier Island.

In addition to breeding birds, there are likely to be a further 6000 juveniles, pre-breeders and non-breeding birds at sea. Black petrels may range from the east coast of Australia all the way to the coast of South America between Mexico and Peru and the Galapagos islands. Females and males forage separately and in different places – it is not known why. Birds forage much closer to the Hauraki Gulf over the summer and autumn while incubating an egg and raising a chick – mainly in the Tasman Sea and to the north-east of New Zealand.

== Behaviour ==
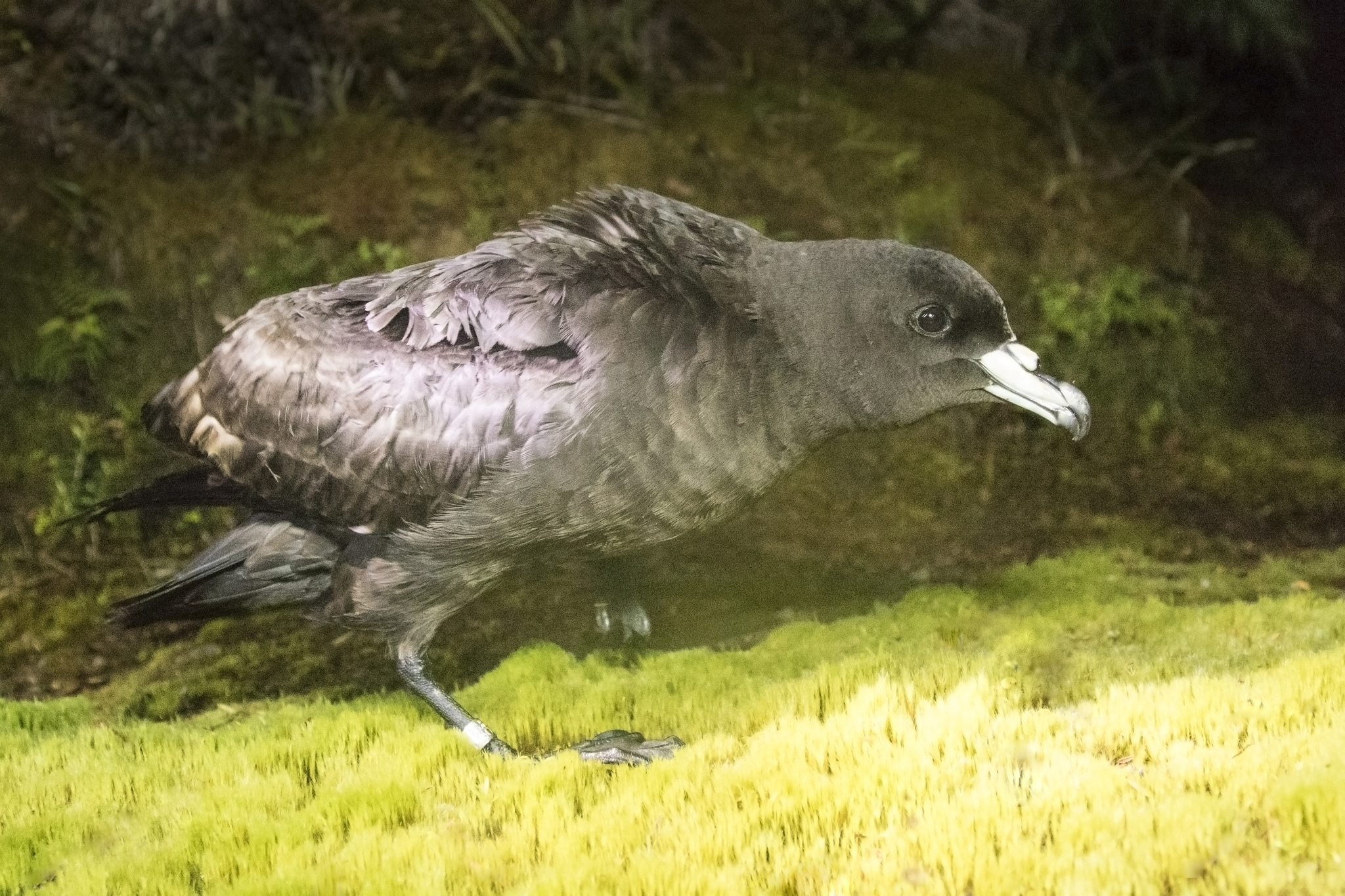
A black petrel on Great Barrier Island in the breeding season

=== Breeding ===
Breeding takes place from October to June in the Hauraki Gulf. Adults return to the colony in mid-October to clean burrows, pair and mate with the same partner. Males will return to the same burrow every year and try to attract another female if their mate does not return or if there is a "divorce" (about 12% annually). Pairs then depart on "honeymoon", returning to the colony again in late November when the females lay a single egg. Both birds share incubation of the egg for 57 days (about 8 weeks). Eggs can hatch from late January through February. Chicks fledge after 107 days (15 weeks) from mid-April through to late June; about 75% of chicks survive to fledge. In 2011 breeding success fell to 61% for unknown reasons.

Adults and chicks migrate to South America for winter (to waters off the Ecuador coast); only 10% of fledged chicks survive this first year. Juveniles will remain at sea in the West Pacific for 3–4 years until they are ready to breed; survival rate is 46% during this time vs 90% for birds over 3 years old). At about four years old, pre-breeding birds will fly back to the colony to find a mate, which may take one or two seasons.

=== Feeding ===
They may feed at night or during the day (unlike albatrosses which do not feed at night). Birds will aggressively follow fishing boats and longline hooks and may dive up to 20m below the surface after baits. Black petrels can cover amazing distances – the longest recorded foraging trip for a bird from Great Barrier Island is 39 days. Mapping of foraging patterns against fishing activity in New Zealand waters is underway.

== Status and conservation ==
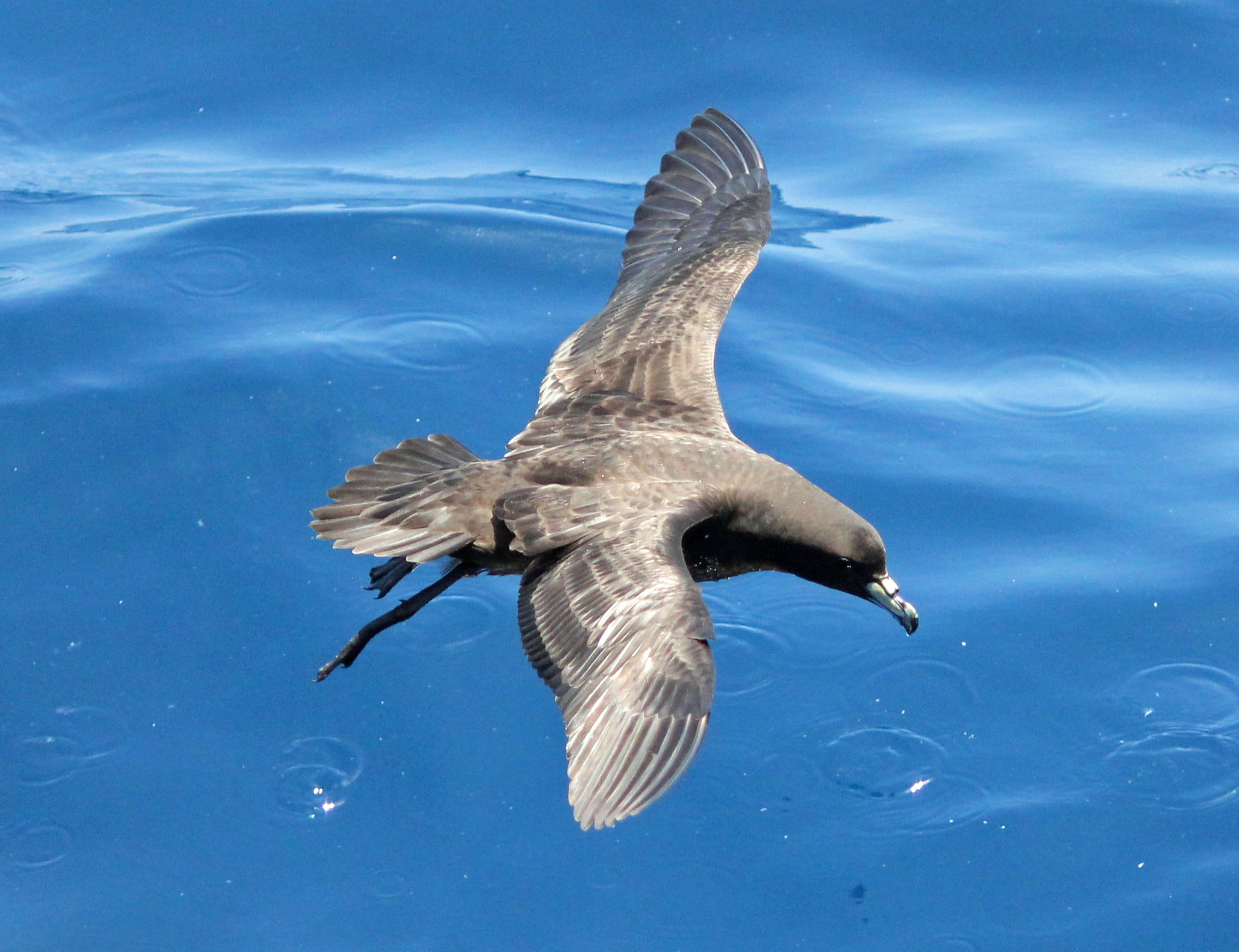
A black petrel off the coast of Wollongong, Australia

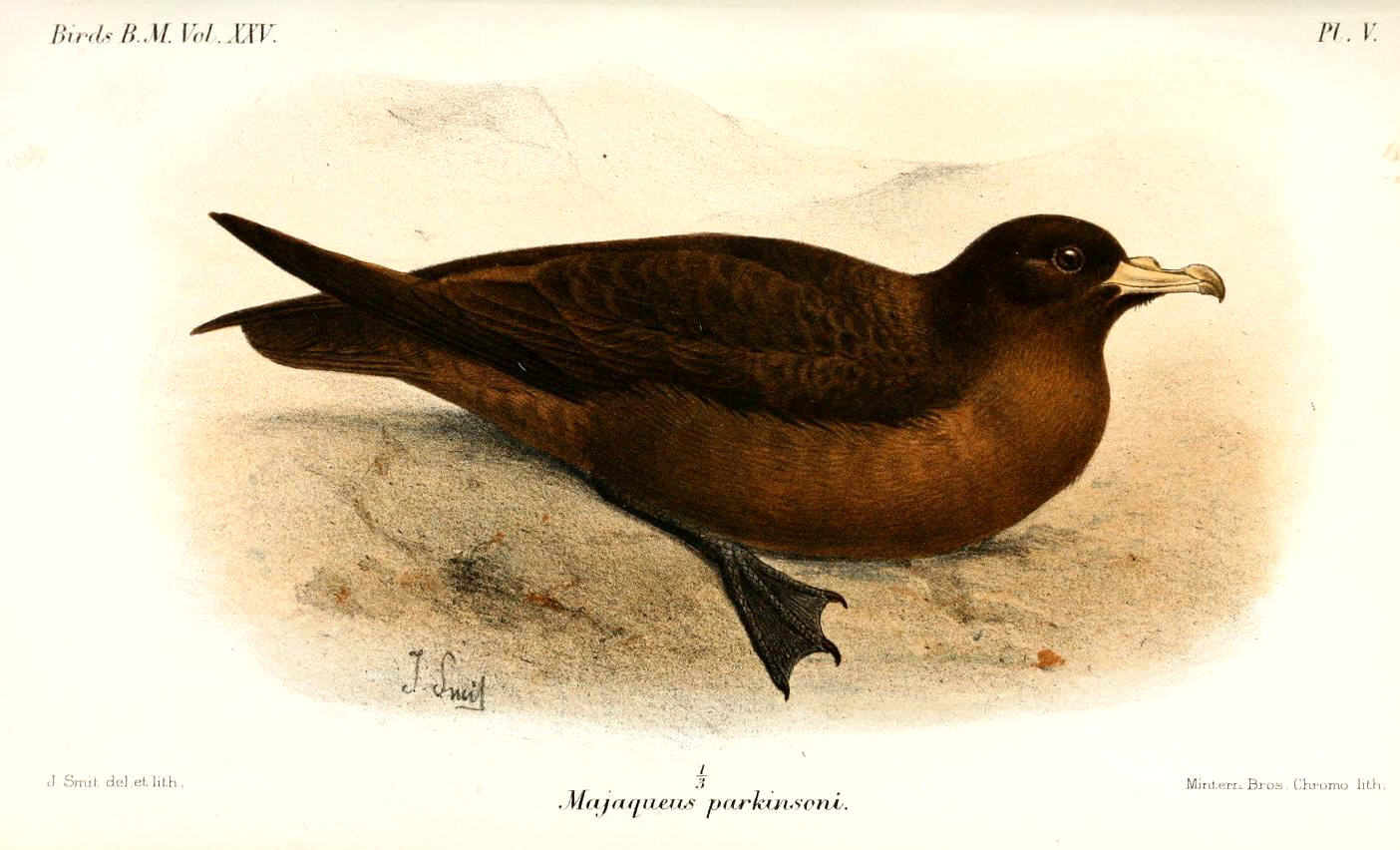
Illustration by Joseph Smit, 1896

The black petrel is classified under the DOC Threat Classification System as Nationally Vulnerable and by the International Union for Conservation of Nature or IUCN Red list: Vulnerable. Land-based population research at their breeding colonies since 1995 indicates the species is declining at a rate of at least 1.4% per year. At current survival rates, a fledged bird has a 1 in 20 chance of reaching breeding age (4+ years) and must breed 20 times successfully just to replace the current population.

While at sea, black petrels are caught by commercial and recreational fishers both in New Zealand and overseas. Ministry of Fisheries research shows the black petrel is the most at-risk seabird in New Zealand from commercial fishing, estimating that between 725 and 1524 birds may have been killed each year in the period 2003 to 2009.

Petrels may be drowned by taking longline hooks after they are set (launched) or when they are being pulled onto boats. Inshore snapper and bluenose bottom longline fisheries are the greatest risks, especially where fisheries overlap with foraging patterns of breeding birds. Reported deaths by fishers are low – since 1996, there have been only 38 birds reported caught and killed in New Zealand waters by local commercial fishers, mainly on domestic tuna longline and on snapper fisheries. Less than 0.5% of boats in these high risk fisheries had observers on board in any one year. The level of deaths in fisheries outside New Zealand waters is unknown. There are anecdotal capture reports from recreational fishers, especially in the outer Hauraki Gulf where birds are commonly reported.

On Great Barrier Island feral pigs are known to dig up burrows and eat eggs and chicks – in one example in 1996 pigs destroyed 8 burrows in one incident. Feral cats can kill adults on the ground or at the nest as well as chicks. Cat numbers on Great Barrier Island are impacted by trapping by the Department of Conservation in the Whangapoua basin but there has been no specific protection of the colony to date. Kiore and ship rats are also present on Great Barrier Island but predation levels are between 1 and 6.5% per annum; kiore cannot eat through a black petrel egg. Risk to black petrel survival from a one-off event/events is significant due to limited habitat for breeding / i.e. a single site on Hirakimata on Great Barrier Island (for example fire, storm damage or predator invasion at main colony).
