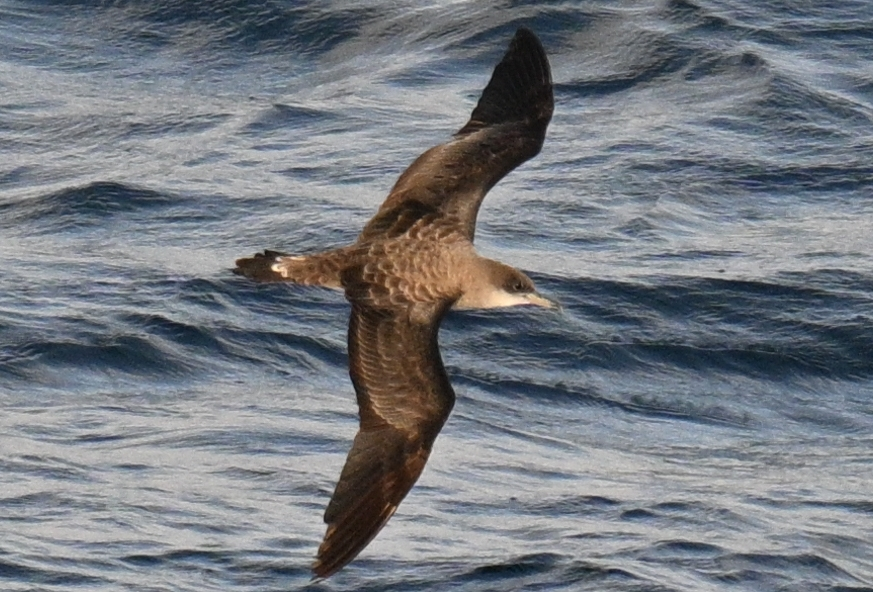

Conservation status
- Near Threatened (IUCN 3.1)

Scientific classification
- Kingdom: Animalia
- Phylum: Chordata
- Class: Aves
- Order: Procellariiformes
- Family: Procellariidae
- Genus: Calonectris
- Species: C. edwardsii

Binomial name
- Calonectris edwardsii (Oustalet, 1883)

= Cape Verde shearwater =

Species of bird

The Cape Verde shearwater (Calonectris edwardsii), or cagarra locally, is a medium-large shearwater, a seabird in the petrel family Procellariidae. It is endemic to the Cape Verde archipelago of Macaronesia in the Atlantic Ocean, off the coast of West Africa.

== Taxonomy ==
The Cape Verde shearwater was originally described in 1883 by Émile Oustalet as a full species. It was later lumped as a subspecies of Cory's shearwater but has since been separated again, by Cornelis Hazevoet in 1995, as a distinct species.

== Description ==
The Cape Verde shearwater has a slim, dark bill, with head and upperparts darker than Cory's. The flight is more typically shearwater-like than Cory's, with stiffer and more rapid wing beats. The overall appearance, compared with Cory's, is of a smaller, slimmer and more angular bird.

== Distribution ==
The shearwaters breed only within the Cape Verde Islands. The largest colonies are on the islands of Brava, Branco and Raso, though the species also breeds in smaller numbers on other islands in the archipelago. Though their pelagic distribution and movements are not well known, they are regularly seen around the islands in the breeding season. After the breeding season they disperse and may sometimes be seen in the upwelling zone in Senegalese waters, where about 10% of the population has been recorded in October. There have been records from the South Atlantic and the eastern coast of North America. Individuals have been found offshore of Maryland and North Carolina.

== Behaviour ==
=== Breeding ===
Following a three-month absence, the mature birds arrive at their island breeding colonies in late February and March, where they nest in cliff hollows, on offshore rocks, and under large boulders. Females lay a single egg and incubation takes place from May to July, with the chicks fledging from late September to November. Following fledging, all birds stay at sea until the next breeding season.

=== Feeding ===
As with other shearwaters, all food is taken at sea and consists of small fish, squid and other marine organisms.

== Status and conservation ==
The total population was estimated in 1993 to number about 20,000 mature individuals (10,000 breeding pairs). Although the species is nationally protected, the chicks are harvested by fishermen for food, with an estimated 5000 birds taken from their nests on Branco and Raso each year. Numbers have declined because of over-harvesting of young birds and the species is considered to be near threatened.
