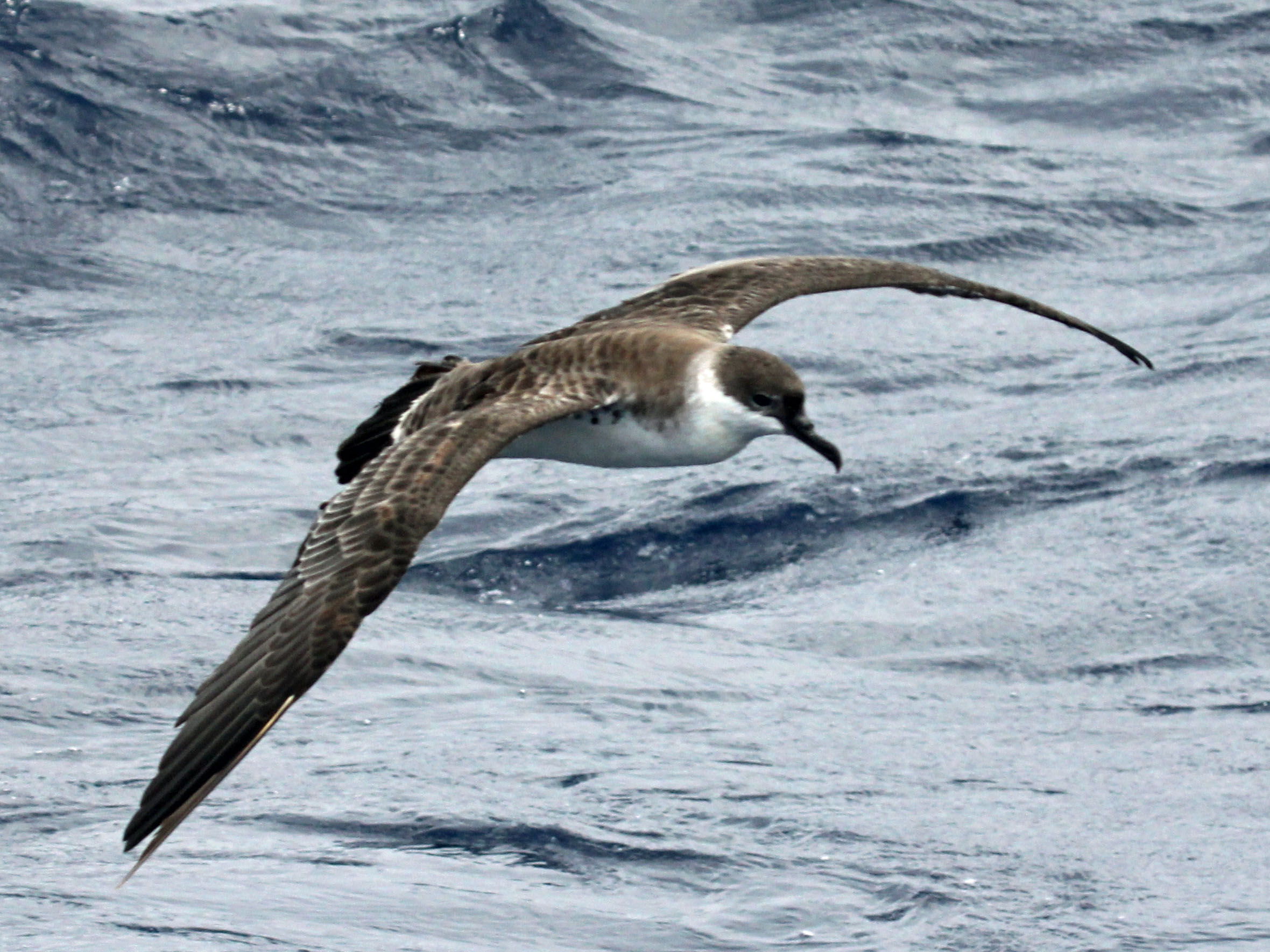
- Great shearwater (Ardenna gravis)

Scientific classification
- Kingdom: Animalia
- Phylum: Chordata
- Class: Aves
- Order: Procellariiformes
- Family: Procellariidae
- Genus: Ardenna; Reichenbach, 1853

Type species
- Puffinus major Faber, 1822 = Procellaria gravis O'Reilly, 1818

Species
- See text

= Ardenna =

Genus of birds

Ardenna is a genus of seabirds in the family Procellariidae. These medium-sized to large shearwater species were formerly included in the genus Puffinus.

== Taxonomy ==
A phylogenetic analysis using mitochondrial DNA published in 2004 found that Puffinus contained two distinct clades and was polyphyletic, with Puffinus more closely related to Calonectris than to Ardenna. To create monophyletic genera a group of species were moved into Ardenna, a genus that had been introduced in 1853 by Ludwig Reichenbach with the great shearwater as the type species. Reichenbach cites the Italian naturalist Ulisse Aldrovandi who in 1603 used the spelling "Artenna" for a seabird. Recent genomic studies have validated the phylogenetic distinction between Ardenna and Puffinus, though this study finding Ardenna rather than Puffinus being closer to Calonectris.

=== Species ===
==== Extant ====
The genus contains seven extant species as shown below:

Image	Scientific name	Common name	Distribution
	A. pacifica	Wedge-tailed shearwater	Breeds on islands in warm temperate and tropical areas of the Indian and Pacific Oceans between 30°N and 30°S, foraging in surrounding waters.
	A. bulleri	Buller's shearwater	Breeds New Zealand, foraging across most of the Pacific Ocean north to 60°N.
	A. grisea	Sooty shearwater	Breeds Tierra del Fuego, Falkland Islands, southeast Australia, New Zealand, foraging widespread in Atlantic and Pacific Oceans north to 65°N (rarely 70°N).
	A. tenuirostris	Short-tailed shearwater	Breeds southern Australia, foraging across most of the western and central Pacific Ocean and marginally into the Arctic Ocean, north to 70°N.
	A. creatopus	Pink-footed shearwater	Breeds Juan Fernandez and Mocha Islands off Chile, foraging in the eastern Pacific Ocean north to 60°N.
	A. carneipes	Flesh-footed shearwater	Breeds southern Indian Ocean (Amsterdam Island) and southwest Pacific Ocean including Lord Howe Island, South Australia and northern New Zealand, foraging across most of the western and central Pacific Ocean north to 60°N.
	A. gravis	Great shearwater	Breeds southern Atlantic Ocean on Tristan da Cunha group, also small numbers on the Falkland Islands, foraging across most of the Atlantic Ocean north to 65°N.

==== Extinct ====
The genus contains five extinct species as shown below:

Scientific name	Stratigraphic age	Distribution
A. buchananbrowni	Late Pliocene	New Zealand
A. conradi	Middle Miocene	Maryland, USA
A. davealleni	Late Pliocene	New Zealand
A. gilmorei	Late Pliocene	California, USA
A. pacificoides	Pleistocene	Saint Helena

=== Phylogeny ===
Phylogeny based on a study by Joan Ferrer Obiol and collaborators published in 2022.

- Ardenna
  - - Buller's shearwater Ardenna bulleri
    - Wedge-tailed shearwater Ardenna pacifica
  - - Short-tailed shearwater Ardenna tenuirostris
    - - Sooty shearwater Ardenna grisea
      - - Great shearwater Ardenna gravis
        - - Flesh-footed shearwater Ardenna carneipes
          - Pink-footed shearwater Ardenna creatopus
