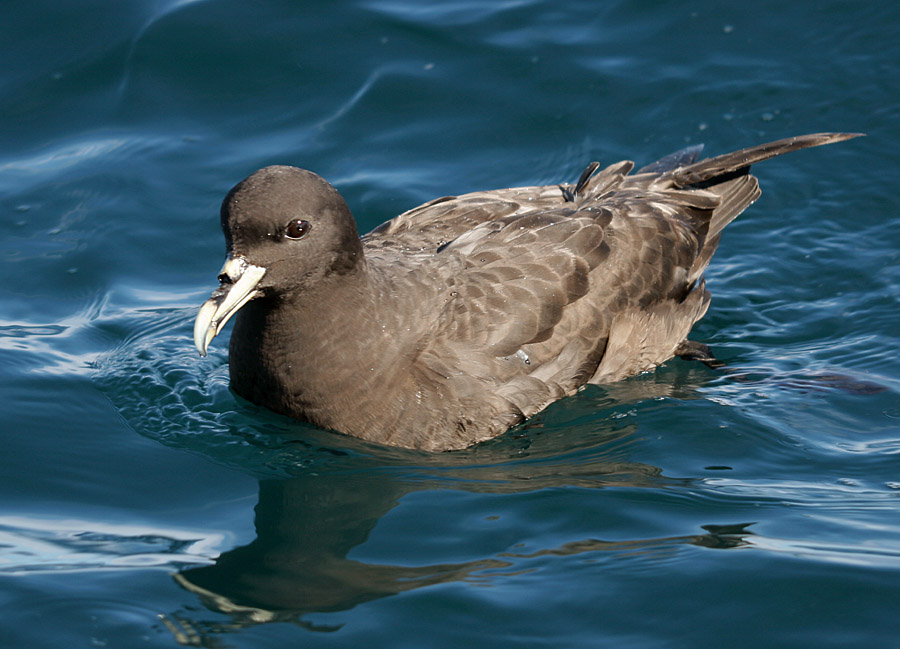
- White-chinned petrel (Procellaria aequinoctialis)

Scientific classification
- Kingdom: Animalia
- Phylum: Chordata
- Class: Aves
- Order: Procellariiformes
- Family: Procellariidae
- Genus: Procellaria; Linnaeus, 1758

Type species
- Procellaria aequinoctialis

= Procellaria =

Genus of birds

Procellaria is a genus of Southern Ocean long-winged seabirds related to prions, and the type genus of the order Procellariiformes. The black petrel (Procellaria parkinsoni) ranges in the Pacific Ocean, and as far north as Central America. The spectacled petrel (Procellaria conspicillata) is confined to the Atlantic Ocean, and the Westland petrel (Procellaria westlandica) to the Pacific Ocean. The white-chinned (Procellaria aequinoctialis) and grey petrel (Procellaria cinerea) range throughout the higher latitudes of the Southern Ocean.

== Taxonomy ==
The genus Procellaria was introduced in 1758 by the Swedish naturalist Carl Linnaeus in the tenth edition of his Systema Naturae. The name is from the Latin procella meaning "storm" or "gale". The type species was designated as the white-chinned petrel by George Robert Gray in 1840.

The genus Procellaria is within the Procellariinae clade or monophyletic group, which includes the shearwaters (a clade comprising Puffinus, Ardenna and Calonectris) along with a clade of 7-8 species of small stocky petrels in Bulweria and Pseudobulweria.

=== Species ===
There are five extant species, all of which have "petrel" in their common name.

Genus Procellaria – Linnaeus, 1758 – five species
Common name	Scientific name and subspecies	Range	Size and ecology	IUCN status and estimated population
Grey petrel, grey shearwater, or pediunker	Procellaria cinerea (Gmelin, JF, 1789)	breeds on subantarctic islands	Size: Habitat: Diet:	NT
White-chinned petrel	Procellaria aequinoctialis Linnaeus, 1758 Two subspecies: P. a. aequinoctialis Linnaeus, 1758; P. a. steadi Mathews, 1912	breeds on subantarctic islands	Size: Habitat: Diet:	VU
Spectacled petrel	Procellaria conspicillata Gould, 1844	breeds on Inaccessible Island	Size: Habitat: Diet:	VU
Black petrel or Parkinson's petrel	Procellaria parkinsoni Gray, 1862	breeds on Little Barrier Island and Great Barrier Island	Size: Habitat: Diet:	VU
Westland petrel	Procellaria westlandica Falla, 1946	breeds on South Island	Size: Habitat: Diet:	EN

Fossil material of an extinct species Procellaria altirostris discovered in New Zealand and dating from the Pliocene was described in 2021.

== Description ==
Procellaria is a member of the family Procellariidae and the order Procellariiformes. As members of Procellariiformes, they share certain characteristics. First they have tubular nostrils called naricorns. This feature gives them their common name, tubenoses. The opening to the nostril is located differently in some birds. These birds have the opening on top of the upper bill. Second, they produce a stomach oil that contains wax esters and triglycerides. This oil fills two functions. When predators threaten the birds or their chick or egg, they spit the substance on them. This substance has an awful smell, and mats the feathers down, degrading their usefulness. Also, they can digest the wax esters for a high energy source of food, during long flights or the period of time that they are incubating their egg or caring for their young. They also have a uniquely structured bill, with seven to nine distinct horny plates. Finally, they have a salt gland that is located above their nasal passages and helps desalinate their body, as they drink seawater. They excrete the salty waste out their nose.

== Distribution and habitat ==
They range from the cold waters of the Southern Ocean to temperate waters, and are pelagic except during the breeding season.

== Behaviour ==
These tubenoses fly like shearwaters, with stiff wings and shearing technique across wave fronts. This technique saves energy. During breeding season they utilize coastal cliffs on islands, laying their single egg in a burrow.

== Conservation ==
The conservation status of bird species are designated by BirdLife International on behalf of the International Union for Conservation of Nature. The white-chinned, spectacled and black petrel are classified as "Vulnerable", the grey petrel as "Near-threatened" and the Westland petrel as "Endangered". All five members of the genus are listed in the Agreement on the Conservation of Albatrosses and Petrels.

== Sources ==
- Double, M. C. (2003). "Procellariiformes (Tubenosed Seabirds)". In Hutchins, Michael; Jackson, Jerome A.; Bock, Walter J.; Olendorf, Donna (eds.). Grzimek's Animal Life Encyclopedia. Volume 8: Birds I Tinamous and Ratites to Hoatzins. Joseph E. Trumpey, Chief Scientific Illustrator (2nd ed.). Farmington Hills, MI: Gale Group. pp. 107–111. ISBN 0-7876-5784-0.
- Ehrlich, Paul R.; Dobkin, David, S.; Wheye, Darryl (1988). The Birders Handbook (1st ed.). New York, NY: Simon & Schuster. pp. 29–31. ISBN 0-671-65989-8.
