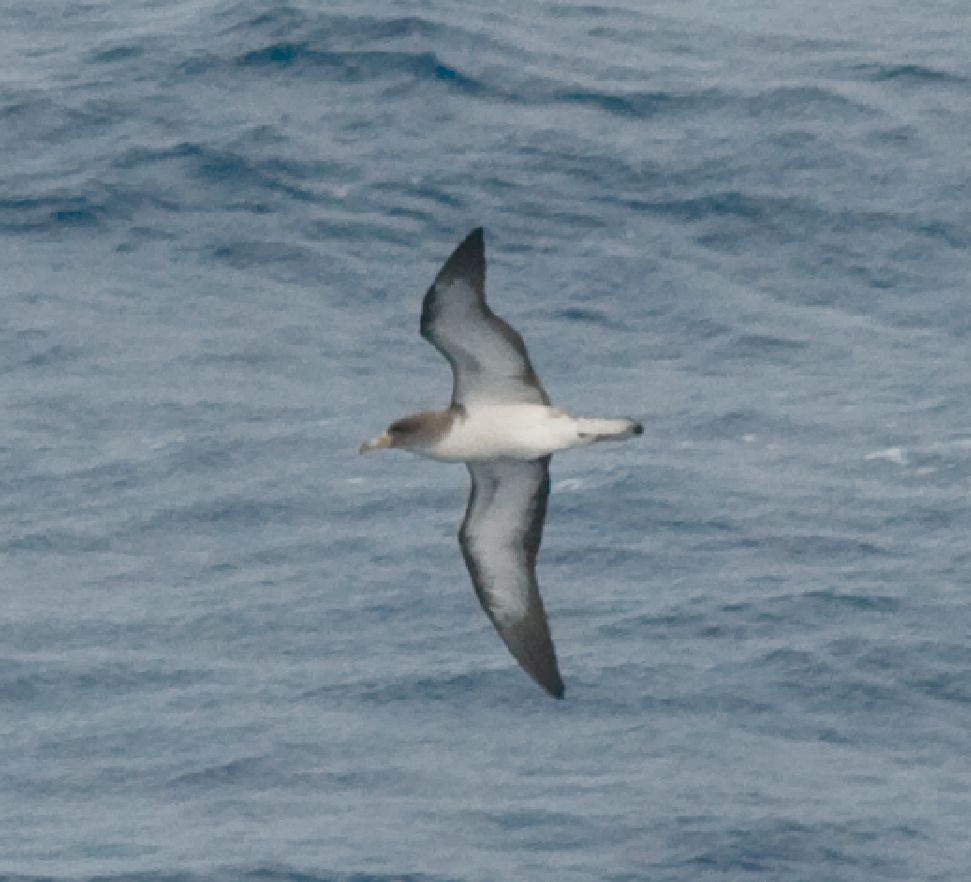

Scientific classification
- Kingdom: Animalia
- Phylum: Chordata
- Class: Aves
- Order: Procellariiformes
- Family: Procellariidae
- Genus: Calonectris; Mathews & Iredale, 1915

Type species
- Puffinus leucomelas (streaked shearwater) Temminck, 1835

Species
- Calonectris leucomelas Calonectris diomedea Calonectris borealis Calonectris edwardsii

= Calonectris =

Genus of birds

Calonectris is a genus of seabirds. The genus name comes from Ancient Greek kalos, "good" and nectris, "swimmer".

The genus comprises four large shearwaters. There are two other shearwater genera, Puffinus, which comprises 21 small to medium-sized shearwaters, and Ardenna with 7 larger species.

The species in this group are long-winged birds, dark brown or grey-brown above, and mainly white below. They are pelagic outside the breeding season. They are most common in temperate and cold waters. Like most other tubenose birds, they use a shearing flight technique to move across wave fronts with the minimum of active flight, but fly with a more relaxed, fluid, flexible wing action than the other shearwaters in Puffinus and Ardenna.

Calonectris shearwaters are long-distance migrants. The streaked shearwater disperses from its east Asian breeding islands throughout the western Pacific and into the eastern Indian Ocean. They come to islands and coastal cliffs only to breed. They are nocturnal at the colonial breeding sites, preferring moonless nights to minimise predation. They nest in burrows and often give eerie contact calls on their night time visits. They lay a single white egg. They feed on fish, squid and similar oceanic food. They will follow fishing boats to take scraps.

== Taxonomy ==
The genus Calonectris was introduced in 1915 by the ornithologists Gregory Mathews and Tom Iredale with the streaked shearwater as the type species. The genus name combines the Ancient Greek kalos meaning "good" or "noble" with the genus name Nectris that was used for shearwaters by the German naturalist Heinrich Kuhl in 1820. The name Nectris comes from the Ancient Greek nēktris meaning "swimmer".

Scopoli's shearwater and Cory's shearwater were previously considered as conspecific and formed the Cory's shearwater complex (Calonectris diomedea). Based on the lack of hybridization and differences in mitochondrial DNA, morphology and vocalisation, the complex was split into two separate species. The English name "Cory's shearwater" was transferred to Calonectris borealis while what was previously the nominate subspecies became Scopoli's shearwater (Calonectris diomedea).

=== Species ===
The genus contains four species.

Image	Scientific name	Common name	Distribution
	Calonectris leucomelas	Streaked shearwater	Pacific Ocean, nesting in Japan and the Korean Peninsula. Forages in the western Pacific between 45°N and 35°S.
	Calonectris borealis	Cory's shearwater	Breeds on Madeira, the Azores, the Canary Islands and the Berlengas islands off the Portuguese coast. Forages in the Atlantic between 60°N and 36°S; also marginally into the western Mediterranean, and the Indian Ocean off South Africa.
	Calonectris diomedea	Scopoli's shearwater	Breeds on Mediterranean islands. Forages in the Mediterranean, and the Atlantic between 50°N and 36°S; also marginally into the Indian Ocean off South Africa.
	Calonectris edwardsii	Cape Verde shearwater	Breeds on the Cape Verde Islands. Forages in the Atlantic between 18°N and 40°S.

Extinct species, Calonectris krantzi from the Early Pliocene and Calonectris wingatei from the Middle Pleistocene, have also been described from fossils. Calonectris kurodai, another fossil from the Middle Miocene Calvert Formation of Chesapeake Bay is named after the Japanese ornithologist Nagahisa Kuroda.

=== Phylogeny ===
Phylogeny based on a study by Joan Ferrer Obiol and collaborators published in 2022.

- Calonectris
  - Streaked shearwater, Calonectris leucomela
  - - Cape Verde shearwater, Calonectris edwardsii
    - - Cory's shearwater, Calonectris borealis
      - Scopoli's shearwater, Calonectris diomedea
