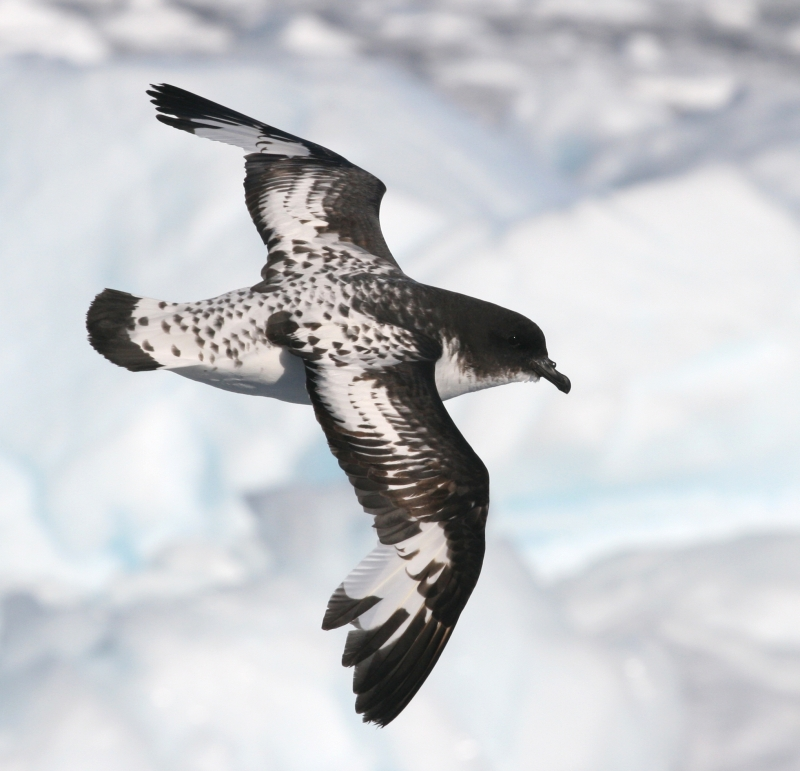
- Cape petrel (Daption capense)

Scientific classification
- Kingdom: Animalia
- Phylum: Chordata
- Class: Aves
- Order: Procellariiformes
- Family: Procellariidae; Leach, 1820

Genera
- Macronectes; Fulmarus; Thalassoica; Daption; Pagodroma; Halobaena; Pachyptila; Procellaria; Bulweria; Calonectris; Puffinus; Pelecanoides; Ardenna; Pseudobulweria; Aphrodroma; Pterodroma

Diversity
- 16 genera, 99 species, of which 3 are extinct

= Procellariidae =

Family of seabirds which includes petrels, shearweters and prions

The family Procellariidae is a group of seabirds that comprises the fulmarine petrels, the gadfly petrels, the diving petrels, the prions, and the shearwaters. This family is part of the bird order Procellariiformes (or tubenoses), which also includes the albatrosses and the storm petrels.

The procellariids are the most numerous family of tubenoses, and the most diverse. They range in size from the giant petrels with a wingspan of around 2.0 m (6 ft 7 in), that are almost as large as the albatrosses, to the diving petrels with a wingspan of around 34 cm (13 in) that are similar in size to the little auks or dovekies in the family Alcidae. Male and female birds are identical in appearance. The plumage colour is generally dull, with blacks, whites, browns and greys. The birds feed on fish, squid and crustacea, with many also taking fisheries discards and carrion. Whilst agile swimmers and excellent in water, petrels have weak legs and can only shuffle on land, with the giant petrels of the genus Macronectes being the only two species that are capable of proper terrestrial locomotion. All species are accomplished long-distance foragers, and many undertake long trans-equatorial migrations. They are colonial breeders, exhibiting long-term mate fidelity and site philopatry. In all species, a single white egg is laid each breeding season. The parents take it in turns to incubate the egg and to forage for food. The feeding area can be at a great distance from the nest site. The incubation times and chick-rearing periods are exceptionally long compared to other birds.

Many procellariids have breeding populations of over several million pairs; others number fewer than 200 birds. Humans have traditionally exploited several species of fulmar and shearwater (known as muttonbirds) for food, fuel, and bait, a practice that continues in a controlled fashion today. Several species are threatened by introduced species attacking adults and chicks in breeding colonies and by long-line fisheries.

== Taxonomy and evolution ==
The family Procellariidae was introduced (as Procellaridæ) by the English zoologist William Elford Leach in a guide to the contents of the British Museum published in 1820. The name is derived from the type genus Procellaria which in turn is derived from the Latin word procella meaning "storm" or "gale". The type genus was named in 1758 by the Swedish naturalist Carl Linnaeus in the tenth edition of his Systema Naturae.

Procellariidae is one of families that make up the order Procellariiformes. Before the introduction of molecular phylogenetics, the traditional arrangement was to divide the Procellariiformes into a set of four families: Diomedeidae containing the albatrosses, Hydrobatidae containing all the storm petrels, Pelecanoididae containing the diving petrels and Procellariidae containing the petrels, shearwaters and fulmars. The family Hydrobatidae was further divided into two subfamilies, the northern storm petrels in Hydrobatinae and the southern or austral storm petrels in Oceanitinae. A 1998 analysis of mitochondrial cytochrome b sequences found there was deep genetic divergence between the two subfamilies. Subsequent large-scale multigene studies found that the two subfamilies were not sister taxa. The storm petrels were therefore split into two families: Hydrobatidae containing the northern storm petrels and Oceanitidae, containing the southern storm petrels. The multigene genetic studies found that the diving petrels in the family Pelecanoididae were nested within the family Procellariidae. As a result, the diving petrels was merged into Procellariidae.

The molecular evidence suggests that the albatrosses were the first to diverge from the ancestral stock, and the austral storm petrels next, with the procellariids and northern storm petrels splitting most recently.

- Procellariiformes
  - Diomedeidae – albatrosses (21 species)
  - - Oceanitidae – austral storm petrels (9 species)
    - - Hydrobatidae – northern storm petrels (18 species)
      - Procellariidae – petrels and shearwaters (99 species)

Within the procellariid family, a genetic analysis based on the cytochrome b gene published in 2004 indicated that the genus Puffinus contained two distinct clades and was polyphyletic. The genus was therefore split and a group of species moved into the resurrected genus Ardenna. The other genera within the family were found to be monotypic but the relationships between the genera remained unclear. This changed when a multigene genetic study published in 2021 provided a genus-level phylogeny of the family.

- Procellariidae
  - - Pagodroma – snow petrel
    - - Thalassoica – Antarctic petrel
      - - Daption – Cape petrel
        - - Macronectes – giant petrels (2 species)
          - Fulmarus – fulmars (2 species)
  - - - - Pelecanoides – diving petrels (4 species)
        - - Halobaena – blue petrel
          - Pachyptila – prions (7 species)
      - - Aphrodroma – Kerguelen petrel
        - Pterodroma – gadfly petrels (35 species)
    - - - Bulweria – petrels (2 extant species)
        - Pseudobulweria – petrels (4 species)
      - - Procellaria – petrels (5 species)
        - - Puffinus – shearwaters (21 species)
          - - Calonectris – shearwaters (4 species)
            - Ardenna – shearwaters (7 species)

There are 99 species of procellariid in 16 genera. The family has usually been broken up into four fairly distinct groups; the fulmarine petrels, the gadfly petrels, the prions, and the shearwaters. With the inclusion of the diving petrels there are now five main groups.

- The fulmarine petrels include the largest procellariids, the giant petrels, as well as the two fulmar species, the snow petrel, the Antarctic petrel, and the Cape petrel. The fulmarine petrels are a diverse group with differing habits and appearances, but are linked morphologically by their skull features, particularly the long prominent nasal tubes.
- The four diving petrels are the smallest procellariids with lengths of around 20 cm (7.9 in) and wingspans of 33 cm (13 in). They are compact birds with short wings that are adapted for use under water. They have a characteristic whirring flight and dive into the water without settling. They probably remain all year in the seas near their breeding sites.
- The gadfly petrels, so named due to their helter-skelter flight, are the 35 species in the genus Pterodroma. The species vary from small to medium sizes, 26–46 cm (10–18 in) in length, and are long winged with short hooked bills. They are most closely related to Kerguelen petrel which is placed in its own genus Aphrodroma.
- The prions comprise seven species of true prion in the genus Pachyptila and the closely related blue petrel. Often known in the past as whalebirds, three species have large bills filled with lamellae that they use to filter plankton somewhat as baleen whales do, though the old name derives from their association with whales, not their bills (though "prions" does, deriving from Ancient Greek for "saw"). They are small procellariids, 25–30 cm (9.8–11.8 in) in length, with a prominent dark M-shaped mark across the upperwing of their grey plumage. All are restricted to the southern hemisphere.
- The shearwaters are adapted for diving after prey instead of foraging on the ocean's surface; several species have been recorded diving deeper than 30 m (98 ft). They are known for the long trans-equatorial migrations undertaken by many species. The shearwaters include the 20 or so species of the genus Puffinus, seven species in the genus Ardenna, as well as the five large Procellaria species and the four Calonectris species. While all these four genera are often known collectively as shearwaters, the Procellaria are called petrels in their common names.

== Morphology and flight ==
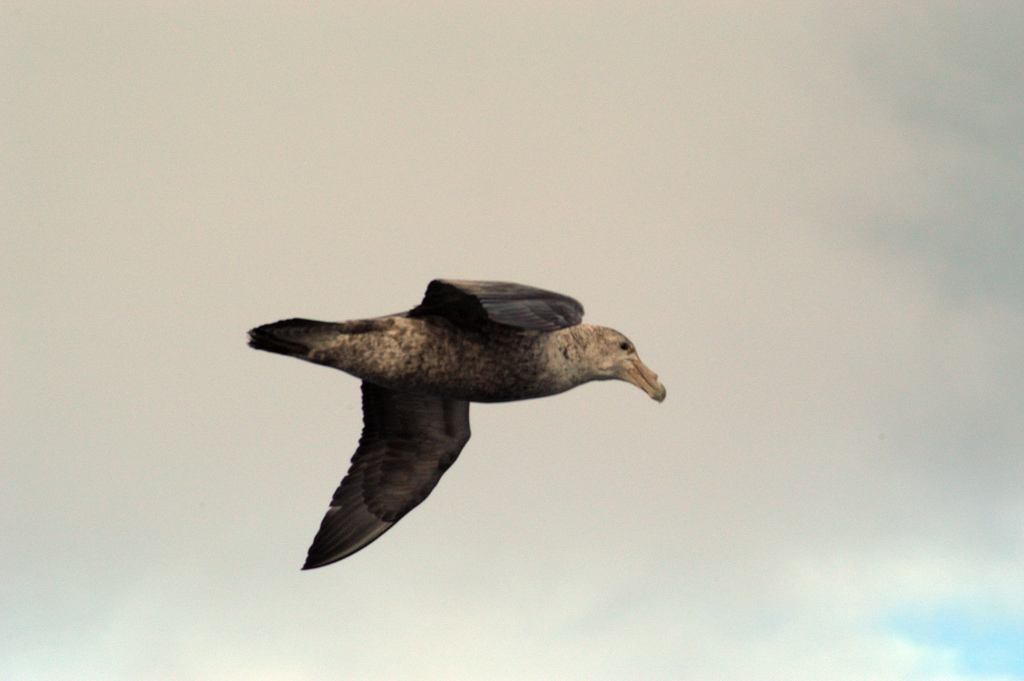
The flight of giant petrels is aided by a shoulder-lock that holds their wing out without effort.

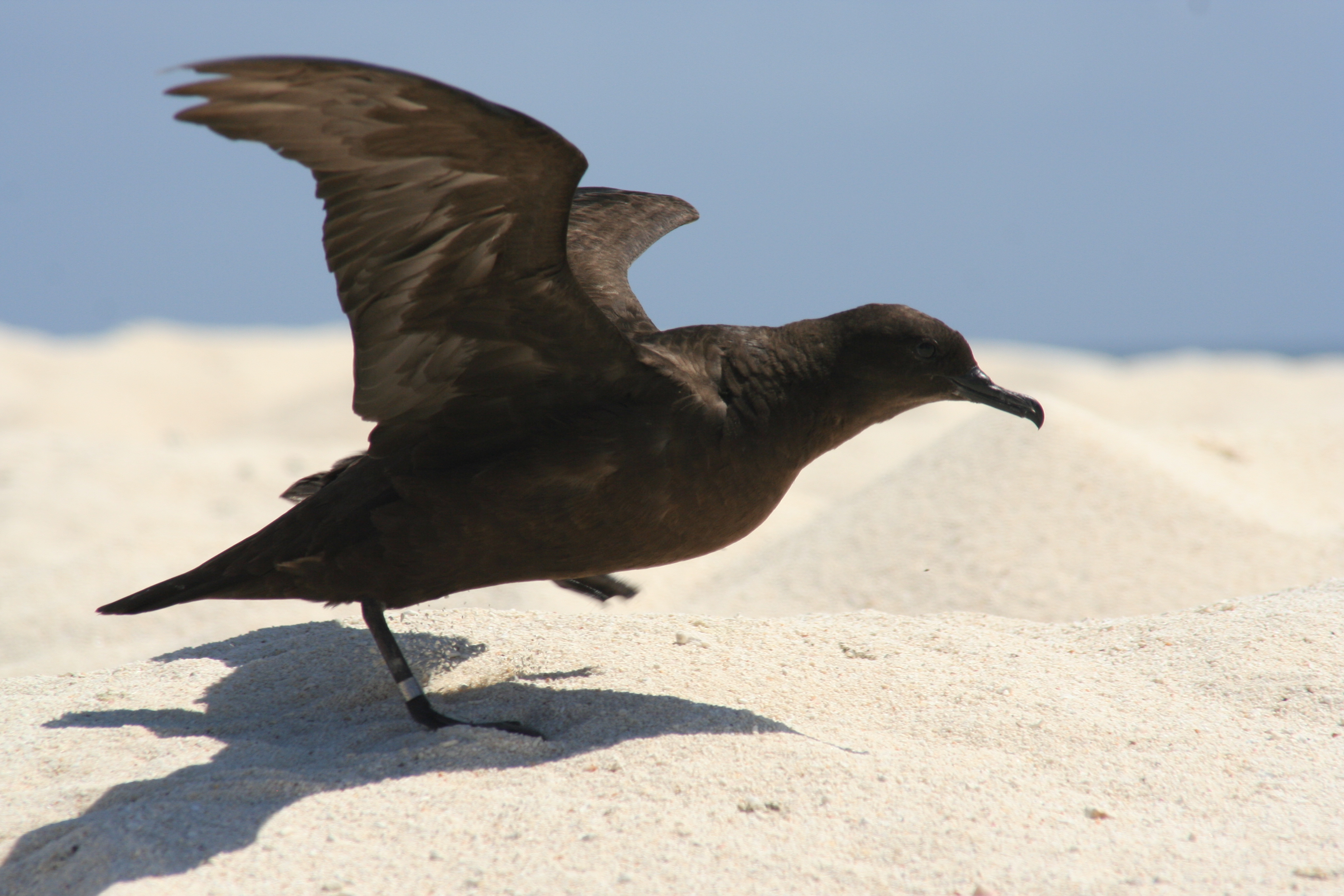
To take off this Christmas shearwater (Puffinus nativitatis) must face into a strong wind. In calm conditions it must run in order to obtain a high airspeed.

The procellariids are small- to medium-sized seabirds. The largest, the southern giant petrel with a wingspan of 185 to 205 cm (73 to 81 in), is almost as large as albatrosses; the smallest, the diving petrels have a wingspan of 30 to 38 cm (12 to 15 in) and are similar in size to little auks or dovekies in the family Alcidae. There are no obvious differences between the sexes, although females tend to be slighter. Like all Procellariiformes, the procellariids have a characteristic tubular nasal passage used for olfaction. This ability to smell helps to locate patchily distributed prey at sea and may help locate nesting colonies. The plumage of the procellariids is usually dull, with greys, bluish greys, blacks and browns being the usual colours, although some species have striking patterns such as the Cape petrel.

The technique of flight among procellariids depends on foraging methods. Compared to an average bird, all procellariids have a high aspect ratio (meaning their wings are long and narrow) and a heavy wing loading. Therefore, they must maintain a high speed in order to remain in the air. Most procellariids use two techniques to do this, namely, dynamic soaring and slope soaring. Dynamic soaring involves gliding across wave fronts, thus taking advantage of the vertical wind gradient and minimising the effort required to stay in the air. Slope soaring is more straightforward: the procellariid turns to the wind, gaining height, from where it can then glide back down to the sea. Most procellariids aid their flight by means of flap-glides, where bursts of flapping are followed by a period of gliding; the amount of flapping dependent on the strength of the wind and the choppiness of the water. Because of the high speeds required for flight, procellariids need to either run or face into a strong wind in order to take off.

The giant petrels share with the albatrosses an adaptation known as a shoulder-lock, a sheet of tendon that locks the wing when fully extended, allowing the wing to be kept up and out without any muscle effort. Gadfly petrels often feed on the wing, snapping prey without landing on the water. The flight of the smaller prions is similar to that of the storm petrels, being highly erratic and involving weaving and even looping the loop. The wings of all species are long and stiff. In some species of shearwater the wings are used to power the birds underwater while diving for prey. Their heavier wing loadings, in comparison with surface-feeding procellariids, allow these shearwaters to achieve considerable depths (below 70 m (230 ft) in the case of the short-tailed shearwater).

Procellariids generally have weak legs that are set back, and many species move around on land by resting on the breast and pushing themselves forward, often with the help of their wings. The exceptions to this are the two species of giant petrel, which have strong legs used when they feed on land.

== Distribution and migration ==
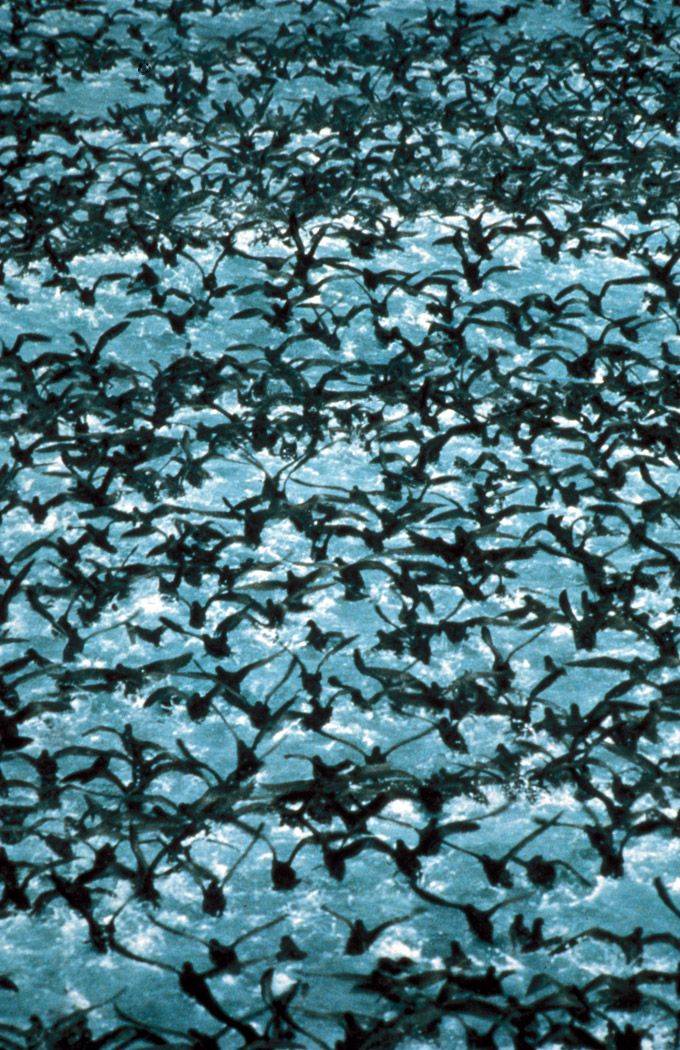
Million-strong flocks of shearwaters migrate from New Zealand to Alaska every year.

The procellariids are present in all the world's oceans and most of the seas. They are absent from the Bay of Bengal and Hudson Bay, but are present year round or seasonally in the rest. The seas north of New Zealand are the centre of procellariid biodiversity, with the most species. Among the groups, the fulmarine petrels have a mostly polar distribution, with most species living around Antarctica and one, the northern fulmar ranging in the Northern Atlantic and Pacific Oceans. Of the four species of diving petrel, two are found along the coasts of South America, while the remaining two have circumpolar distributions in the Southern Ocean. The prions are restricted to the Southern Ocean, and the gadfly petrels are found mostly in the tropics with some temperate species. The shearwaters are the most widespread group and breed in most temperate and tropical seas.

Many procellariids undertake long annual migrations in the non-breeding season. Southern species of shearwater such as the sooty shearwater and short-tailed shearwater, breeding on islands off Australia, New Zealand and Chile, undertake transequatorial migrations of millions of birds up to the waters off Alaska and back each year during the austral winter. Manx shearwaters from the North Atlantic also undertake transequatorial migrations from Western Europe and North America to the waters off Brazil and Argentina in the South Atlantic. The mechanisms of navigation are poorly understood, but displacement experiments where individuals were removed from colonies and flown to far-flung release sites have shown that they are able to home in on their colonies with remarkable precision. A Manx shearwater released in Boston returned to its colony in Skomer, Wales within 13 days, a distance of 5,150 kilometres (3,200 mi). The gadfly petrels in the genus Pterodroma, breeding in warm temperate locations, also move immense distances to feed; Bermuda petrels nesting on Bermuda regularly travel as far as the seas off Newfoundland, western Ireland and the Bay of Biscay, with individuals covering 64,000–130,000 km (40,000–81,000 mi) in a year.

== Behaviour ==
=== Food and feeding ===
The diet of the procellariids is the most diverse of all the Procellariiformes, as are the methods employed to obtain it. With the exception of the giant petrels, all procellariids are exclusively marine, and the diet of all species is dominated by either fish, squid, crustaceans and carrion, or some combination thereof.

The majority of species are surface feeders, obtaining food that has been pushed to the surface by other predators or currents, or have floated in death. Among the surface feeders some, principally the gadfly petrels, can obtain food by dipping from flight, while most of the rest feed while sitting on the water. These surface feeders are dependent on their prey being close to the surface, and for this reason procellariids are often found in association with other predators or oceanic convergences. Studies have shown strong associations between many different kinds of seabirds, including wedge-tailed shearwaters, and dolphins and tuna, which push shoaling fish up towards the surface. The gadfly petrels and the Kerguelen petrel mainly feed at night. In so doing they can take advantage of the nocturnal migration of cephalopods and other food species towards the surface.

The fulmarine petrels are generalists, which for the most part take many species of fish and crustacea. The giant petrels, uniquely for Procellariiformes, will feed on land, eating the carrion of other seabirds and seals. They will also attack the chicks of other seabirds. The diet of the giant petrels varies according to sex, with the females taking more krill and the males more carrion. All the fulmarine petrels readily feed on fisheries discards at sea, a habit that has been implicated in (but not proved to have caused) the expansion in range of the northern fulmar in the Atlantic.

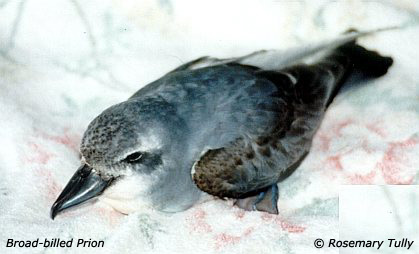
The broad-billed prion (Pachyptila vittata) filters zooplankton from the water with its wide bill.

The three larger prion species have bills filled with lamellae, which act as filters to sift zooplankton from the water. Water is forced through the lamellae and small prey items are collected. This technique is often used in conjunction with a method known as hydroplaning where the bird dips its bill beneath the surface and propels itself forward with wings and feet as if walking on the water.

The diving petrels and many of the shearwaters are proficient divers. While it has long been known that they regularly dive from the surface to pursue prey, using their wings for propulsion, the depth that they are able to dive to was not appreciated (or anticipated) until scientists began to deploy maximum-depth recorders on foraging birds. Studies of both long-distance migrants such as the sooty shearwater and more sedentary species such as the black-vented shearwater have shown maximum diving depths of 68 m (223 ft) and 52 m (171 ft). Tropical shearwaters, such as the wedge-tailed shearwater and the Sargasso shearwater, also dive in order to hunt, making the shearwaters the only tropical seabirds capable of exploiting that ecological niche (all other tropical seabirds feed close to the surface). Many other species of procellariid, from white-chinned petrels to slender-billed prions, dive to a couple of metres below the surface, though not as proficiently or as frequently as the shearwaters.

=== Breeding ===
==== Colonies ====
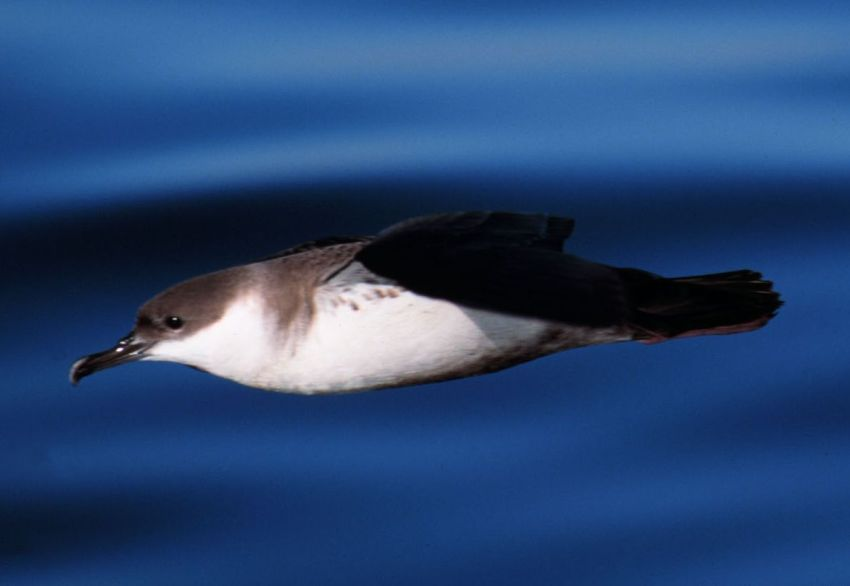
The colonies of the great shearwater (Ardenna gravis) are among the densest of any procellariid, with 1 pair per m^{2}.

The procellariids are colonial, nesting for the most part on islands. These colonies vary in size from over a million birds to just a few pairs, and can be densely concentrated or widely spaced. At one extreme the greater shearwater nests in concentrations of one pair per square metre in three colonies of more than one million pairs, whereas the giant petrels nest in clumped but widely spaced territories that barely qualify as colonial. Colonies are usually located near the coast, but some species nest far inland and even at high altitudes. Hutton's shearwater (Puffinus huttoni) breeds in burrows on the sea-facing mountainside of the Kaikoura Ranges on South Island, New Zealand. The colonies are 1,200–1,800 m (3,900–5,900 ft) above sea level at a distance of 12–18 km (7.5–11.2 mi) from the coast. Other exceptions are Barau's petrel (Pterodroma baraui) that breeds at 2,700 m (8,900 ft) on the island of Réunion in the Indian Ocean, and the snow petrel (Pagodroma nivea) that breeds in Antarctica on mountain ledges up to 400 km (250 mi) from the open sea.

Most seabirds are colonial, and the reasons for colonial behaviour are assumed to be similar, if incompletely understood by scientists. Procellariids for the most part have weak legs and are unable to easily take off, making them highly vulnerable to mammalian predators. Most procellariid colonies are located on islands that have historically been free of mammals; for this reason some species cannot help but be colonial as they are limited to a few locations to breed. Even species that breed on continental Antarctica, such as the Antarctic petrel, are forced by habitat preference (snow-free north-facing rock) to breed in just a few locations.

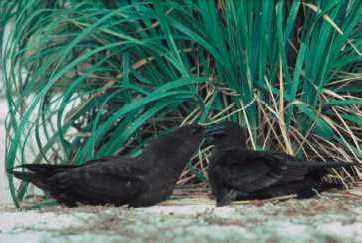
Christmas shearwaters (Puffinus nativitatis) are one of the surface-breeding procellariids. Here a pair engages in some mutual preening.

Most procellariids' nests are in burrows or on the surface on open ground, with a smaller number nesting under the cover of vegetation (such as in a forest). All the fulmarine petrels bar the snow petrel nest in the open, the snow petrel instead nesting inside natural crevices. Of the rest of the procellariids the majority nest in burrows or crevices, with a few tropical species nesting in the open. There are several reasons for these differences. The fulmarine petrels are probably precluded from burrowing by their large size (the crevice-nesting snow petrel is the smallest fulmarine petrel) and the high latitudes they breed in, where frozen ground is difficult to burrow into. The smaller size of the other species, and their lack of agility on land, mean that even on islands free from mammal predators they are still vulnerable to skuas, gulls and other avian predators, something the aggressive oil-spitting fulmars are not. The chicks of all species are vulnerable to predation, but the chicks of fulmarine petrels can defend themselves in a similar fashion to their parents. In the higher latitudes there are thermal advantages to burrow nesting, as the temperature is more stable than on the surface, and there is no wind-chill to contend with. The absence of skuas, gulls and other predatory birds on tropical islands is why some shearwaters and two species of gadfly petrel (Kermadec petrel and the herald petrel) can nest in the open. This has the advantages of reducing competition with burrow nesters from other species and allowing open-ground nesters to nest on coralline islets without soil for burrowing. Procellariids that burrow in order to avoid predation almost always attend their colonies nocturnally in order to reduce predation as well.

Procellariids display high levels of philopatry, exhibiting both natal philopatry and site fidelity. Natal philopatry, the tendency of a bird to breed close to where it hatched, is strong among all the Procellariiformes. The evidence for natal philopatry comes from several sources, not the least of which is the existence of several procellariid species that are endemic to a single island. The study of mitochondrial DNA provides evidence of restricted gene flow between different colonies, and has been used to show philopatry in fairy prions. Bird ringing provides compelling evidence of philopatry; a study of Cory's shearwaters nesting near Corsica found that nine out of 61 male chicks that returned to breed at their natal colony actually bred in the burrow they were raised in. This tendency towards philopatry is stronger in some species than others, and several species readily prospect potential new colony sites and colonise them. It is hypothesised that there is a cost to dispersing to a new site, the chance of not finding a mate of the same species, that selects against it for rarer species, whereas there is probably an advantage to dispersal for species that have colony sites that change dramatically during periods of glacial advance or retreat. There are differences in the tendency to disperse based on sex, with females being more likely to breed away from the natal site.

==== Mate and site fidelity ====
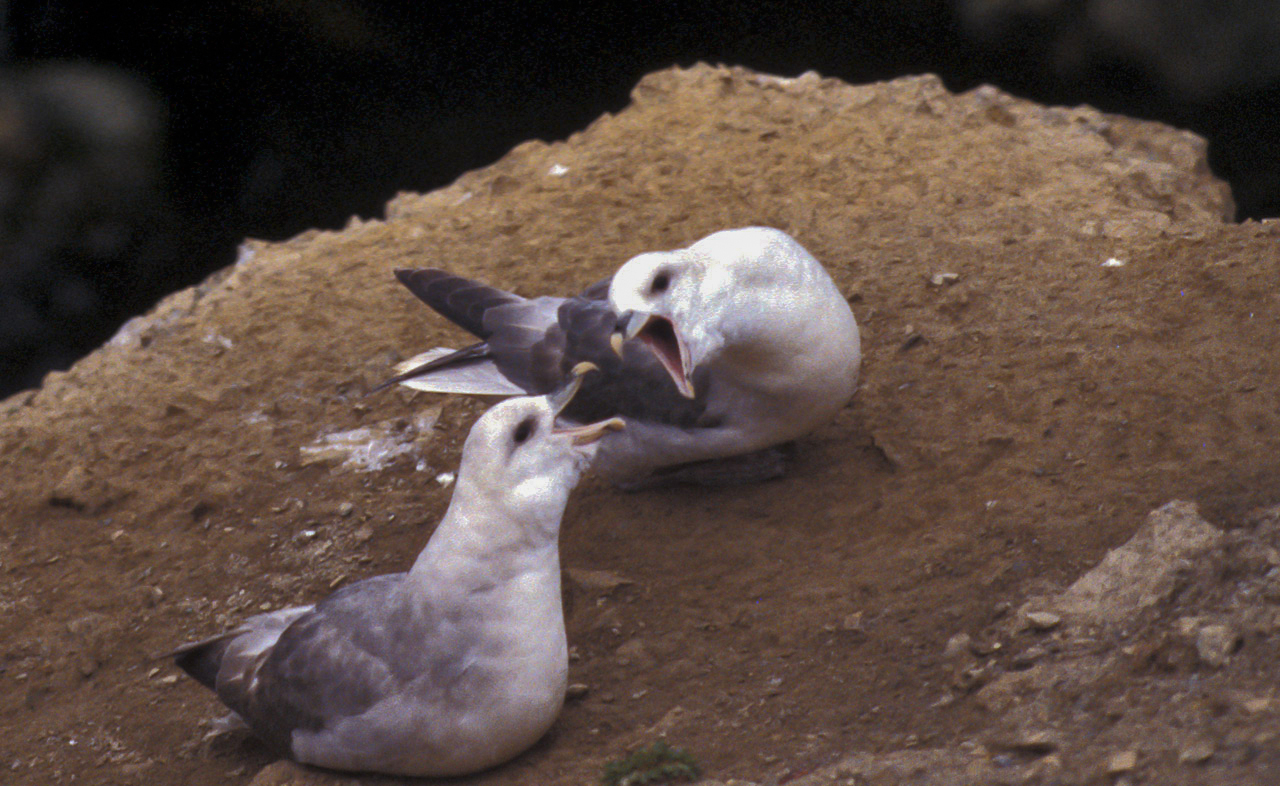
A northern fulmar (Fulmarus glacialis) pair perform a cackling duet.

Procellariids, as well as having strong natal philopatry, exhibit strong site fidelity, returning to the same nesting site, burrow or territory in sequential years. The figure varies for different species but is high for most species, an estimated 91% for Bulwer's petrels. The strength of this fidelity can also vary with sex; almost 85% of male Cory's shearwaters return to the same burrow to breed the year after a successful breeding attempt, while the figure for females is around 76%. This tendency towards using the same site from year to year is matched by strong mate fidelity, with birds breeding with the same partner for many years; it has been suggested that the two are linked, with site fidelity acting as a means in which partnered birds could meet at the beginning of the breeding season. One pair of northern fulmars bred as a pair in the same site for 25 years. Like the albatrosses the procellariids take several years to reach sexual maturity, though due to the greater variety of sizes and lifestyles, the age of first breeding stretches from two or three years in the smaller species to 12 years in the larger ones.

The procellariids lack the elaborate breeding dances of the albatrosses, in no small part due to the tendency of most of them to attend colonies at night and breed in burrows, where visual displays are useless. The fulmarine petrels, which nest on the surface and attend their colonies diurnally, do use a repertoire of stereotyped behaviours such as cackling, preening, head waving and nibbling, but for most species courtship interactions are limited to some billing (rubbing the two bills together) in the burrow and the vocalisations made by all species. The calls serve a number of functions: they are used territorially to protect burrows or territories and to call for mates. Each call type is unique to a particular species and indeed it is possible for procellariids to identify the sex of the bird calling. It may also be possible to assess the quality of potential mates; a study of blue petrels found a link between the rhythm and duration of calls and the body mass of the bird. The ability of an individual to recognise its mate has been demonstrated in several species.

==== Breeding season ====
Like most seabirds, the majority of procellariids breed once a year. There are exceptions; many individuals of the larger species, such as the white-headed petrel, will skip a breeding season after successfully fledging a chick, and some of the smaller species, such as the Christmas shearwaters, breed on a nine-month schedule. Among those that breed annually, there is considerable variation as to the timing; some species breed in a fixed season while others breed all year round. Climate and the availability of food resources are important influences on the timing of procellariid breeding; species that breed at higher latitudes always breed in the summer as conditions are too harsh in the winter. At lower latitudes many, but not all, species breed continuously. Some species breed seasonally to avoid competition with other species for burrows, to avoid predation or to take advantage of seasonally abundant food. Others, such as the tropical wedge-tailed shearwater, breed seasonally for unknown reasons. Among the species that exhibit seasonal breeding there can be high levels of synchronization, both of time of arrival at the colony and of lay date.

Procellariids begin to attend their nesting colony around one month prior to laying. Males will arrive first and attend the colony more frequently than females, partly in order to protect a site or burrow from potential competitors. Prior to laying there is a period known as the pre-laying exodus in which both the male and female are away from the colony, building up reserves in order to lay and undertake the first incubation stint respectively. This pre-laying exodus can vary in length from 9 days (as in the Cape petrel) to around 50 days in Atlantic petrels. All procellariids lay a single white egg per pair per breeding season, in common with the rest of the Procellariiformes. The egg is large compared to that of other birds, weighing 6–24% of the female's weight. Immediately after laying the female goes back to sea to feed while the male takes over incubation. Incubation duties are shared by both sexes in shifts that vary in length between species, individuals and the stage of incubation. The longest recorded shift was 29 days by a Murphy's petrel from Henderson Island; the typical length of a gadfly petrel stint is between 13 and 19 days. Fulmarine petrels, shearwaters and prions tend to have shorter stints, averaging between 3 and 13 days. Incubation takes a long time, from 40 days for the smaller species (such as prions) to around 55 days for the larger species. The incubation period is longer if eggs are abandoned temporarily; procellariid eggs are resistant to chilling and can still hatch after being left unattended for a few days.

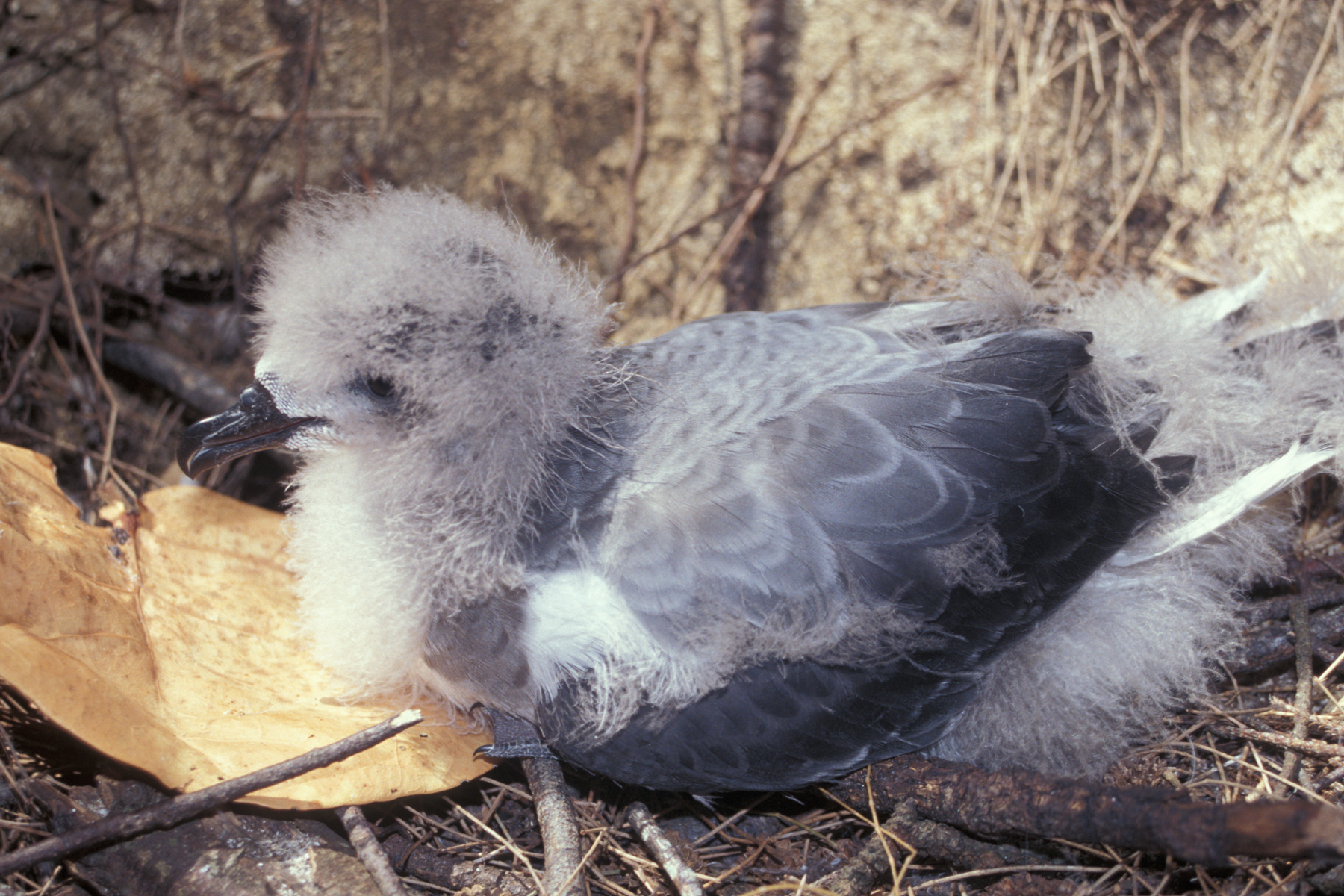
The chick of a Bonin petrel (Pterodroma hypoleuca) takes almost three months to fledge. This chick has most of its adult plumage but still retains a considerable amount of down.

After hatching the chick is brooded by a parent until it is large enough to thermoregulate efficiently, and in some cases defend itself from predation. This guard stage lasts a short while for burrow-nesting species (2–3 days) but longer for surface nesting fulmars (around 16–20 days) and giant petrels (20–30 days). After the guard stage both parents feed the chick. In many species the parent's foraging strategy alternates between short trips lasting 1–3 days and longer trips of 5 days. The shorter trips, which are taken over the continental shelf, benefit the chick with faster growth, but longer trips to more productive pelagic feeding grounds are needed for the parents to maintain their own body condition. The meals are composed of both prey items and stomach oil, an energy-rich food that is lighter to carry than undigested prey items. This oil is created in a stomach organ known as a proventriculus from digested prey items, and gives procellariids and other Procellariiformes their distinctive musty smell. Chick development is quite slow for birds, with fledging taking place at around two months after hatching for the smaller species and four months for the largest species. The chicks of some species are abandoned by the parents; parents of other species continue to bring food to the nesting site after the chick has left. Chicks put on weight quickly and some can outweigh their parents, although they will slim down before they leave the nest. All procellariid chicks fledge by themselves, and there is no further parental care after fledging. Life expectancy of Procellariidae is between 15 and 20 years; the oldest recorded member was a northern fulmar that was over 50 years.

== Relationship with humans ==
=== Exploitation ===
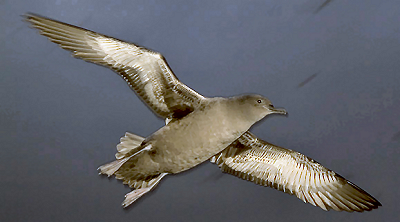
Sooty shearwaters (Ardenna grisea) are still harvested in New Zealand using traditional techniques.

Procellariids have been a seasonally abundant source of food for people wherever people have been able to reach their colonies. Early records of human exploitation of shearwaters (along with albatrosses and cormorants) come from the remains of hunter-gatherer middens in southern Chile, where sooty shearwaters were taken 5000 years ago. More recently, procellariids have been hunted for food by Europeans, particularly the northern fulmar in Europe, and various species by Inuit, and sailors around the world. The hunting pressure on the Bermuda petrel, or cahow, was so intense that the species nearly became extinct and did go missing for 300 years. The name of one species, the providence petrel, is derived from its (seemingly) miraculous arrival on Norfolk Island, where it provided a windfall for starving European settlers; within ten years the providence petrel was extinct on Norfolk. Several species of procellariid have gone extinct in the Pacific since the arrival of humans, and their remains have been found in middens dated to that time. More sustainable shearwater harvesting industries developed in Tasmania and New Zealand, where the practice of harvesting what are known as muttonbirds continues today.

=== Threats and conservation ===
While some species of procellariid have populations that number in the millions, many species are much less common and several are threatened with extinction. Human activities have caused dramatic declines in the numbers of some species, particularly species that were originally restricted to one island. According to the IUCN, 43 species are listed as vulnerable or worse, with 12 critically endangered. Procellariids are threatened by many threats, but introduced species on their breeding grounds, light pollution, marine fisheries particularly bycatch, pollution, exploitation and climate change are the main threats measures as the number of species involved.

The most pressing threat for many species, particularly the smaller ones, comes from species introduced to their colonies. Procellariids overwhelmingly breed on islands away from land predators such as mammals, and for the most part have lost the defensive adaptations needed to deal with them (with the exception of the oil-spitting fulmarine petrels). The introduction of mammal predators such as feral cats, rats, mongooses and mice can have disastrous results for ecologically naïve seabirds. These predators can either directly attack and kill breeding adults, or, more commonly, attack eggs and chicks. Burrowing species that leave their young unattended at a very early stage are particularly vulnerable to attack. Studies on grey-faced petrels breeding on New Zealand's Whale Island (Moutohora) have shown that a population under heavy pressure from Norway rats will produce virtually no young during a breeding season, whereas if the rats are controlled (through the use of poison), breeding success is much higher. That study highlighted the role that non-predatory introduced species can play in harming seabirds; introduced rabbits on the island caused little damage to the petrels, other than damaging their burrows, but they acted as a food source for the rats during the non-breeding season, which allowed rat numbers to be higher than they otherwise would be, resulting in more predators for the petrels to contend with. Interactions with introduced species can be quite complex. Gould's petrels breed only on two islands, Cabbage Tree Island and Boondelbah Island off Port Stephens (New South Wales). Introduced rabbits destroyed the forest understory on Cabbage Tree Island; this both increased the vulnerability of the petrels to natural predators and left them vulnerable to the sticky fruits of the birdlime tree (Pisonia umbellifera), a native plant. In the natural state these fruits lodge in the understory of the forest, but with the understory removed the fruits fall to the ground where the petrels move about, sticking to their feathers and making flight impossible.

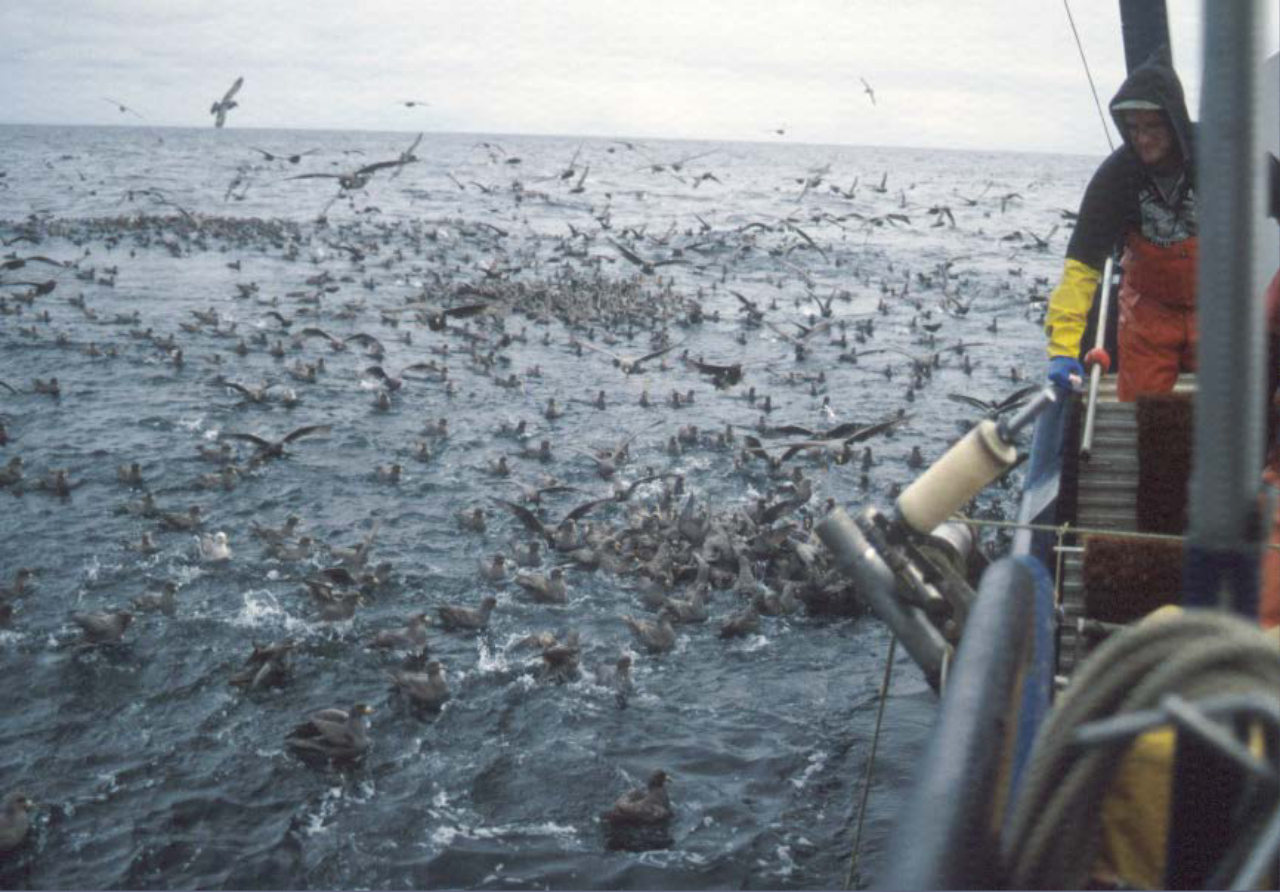
Northern fulmars (Fulmarus glacialis) flocking at a long-lining vessel in the north Pacific

Larger species of procellariid face similar problems to the albatrosses with long-line fisheries. These species readily take offal from fishing boats and will steal bait from the long lines as they are being set, risking becoming snared on the hooks and drowning. In the case of the spectacled petrel this has led to the species undergoing a large decline and its listing as vulnerable. Diving species, most especially the shearwaters, are also vulnerable to gillnet fisheries. Studies of gill-net fisheries show that shearwaters (sooty and short-tailed) compose 60% of the seabirds killed by gill-nets in Japanese waters and 40% in Monterey Bay, California in the 1980s, with the total number of shearwaters killed in Japan being between 65,000 and 125,000 per annum over the same study period (1978–1981).

Procellariids are vulnerable to other threats as well. Ingestion of plastic flotsam is a problem for the family as it is for many other seabirds. Once swallowed, this plastic can cause a general decline in the fitness of the bird, or in some cases lodge in the gut and cause a blockage, leading to death by starvation. Procellariids are also vulnerable to general marine pollution, as well as oil spills. Some species, such as the Barau's petrel, the Newell's shearwater or the Cory's shearwater, which nest high up on large developed islands are victims of light pollution. Chicks that are fledging are attracted to streetlights and are unable to reach the sea. An estimated 20–40% of fledging Barau's petrels are attracted to the streetlights on Réunion.

Conservationists are working with governments and fisheries to prevent further declines and increase populations of endangered procellariids. Progress has been made in protecting many colonies where most species are most vulnerable. On 20 June 2001, the Agreement on the Conservation of Albatrosses and Petrels was signed by seven major fishing nations. The agreement lays out a plan to manage fisheries by-catch, protect breeding sites, promote conservation in the industry, and research threatened species. The developing field of island restoration, where introduced species are removed and native species and habitats restored, has been used in several procellariid recovery programmes. Invasive species such as rats, feral cats and pigs have been either removed or controlled in many remote islands in the tropical Pacific (such as the Northwestern Hawaiian Islands), around New Zealand (where island restoration was developed), and in the south Atlantic and Indian Oceans. The grey-faced petrels of Whale Island (mentioned above) have been achieving much higher fledging successes after the introduced Norway rats were finally completely removed. At sea, procellariids threatened by long-line fisheries can be protected using techniques such as setting long-line bait at night, dying the bait blue, setting the bait underwater, increasing the amount of weight on lines and using bird scarers can all reduce the seabird by-catch. The Agreement on the Conservation of Albatrosses and Petrels came into force in 2004 and has been ratified by eight countries, Australia, Ecuador, New Zealand, Spain, South Africa, France, Peru and the United Kingdom. The treaty requires these countries to take specific actions to reduce by-catch and pollution and to remove introduced species from nesting islands.

== See also ==
- List of Procellariidae species

== Sources ==
- Brooke, M. (2004). Albatrosses and Petrels Across The World. Oxford, UK: Oxford University Press. ISBN 0-19-850125-0.
- Carboneras, C. (1992a). "Family Procellariidae (Petrels and Shearwaters)". In del Hoyo, J.; Elliott, A.; Sargatal, J. (eds.). Handbook of the Birds of the World. Vol. 1: Ostrich to Ducks. Barcelona, Spain: Lynx Edicions. pp. 216–257. ISBN 84-87334-10-5.
- Carboneras, C. (1992b). "Family Pelecanoididae (Diving-petrels)". In del Hoyo, J.; Elliott, A.; Sargatal, J. (eds.). Handbook of the Birds of the World. Vol. 1: Ostrich to Ducks. Barcelona, Spain: Lynx Edicions. pp. 272–278. ISBN 84-87334-10-5.
- Warham, J. (1990). The Petrels: Their Ecology and Breeding Systems. London: Academic Press. ISBN 0-12-735420-4.
- Warham, J. (1996). The Behaviour, Population, Biology and Physiology of the Petrels. London: Academic Press. ISBN 0-12-735415-8.
