= Broomtail =

A broomtail, also called a broomie, is a horse of the American West that is small and of poor quality. The term usually also suggests that the horse is untrained or wild. In some cases, the word is used to describe poor-quality mares, with poor quality male horses then being called "fuzztails." The term has nothing to do with the quality of a horse's tail.

== See also ==
- Cayuse horse
- Stock horse
- Broomtail wrasse
- Broomtail millet
- Broomtail grouper, Mycteroperca xenarcha
- Aluterus scriptus, or Broomtail filefish
