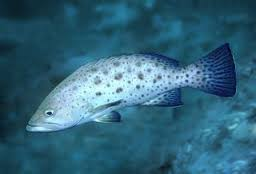

Conservation status
- Data Deficient (IUCN 3.1)

Scientific classification
- Kingdom: Animalia
- Phylum: Chordata
- Class: Actinopterygii
- Order: Perciformes
- Family: Epinephelidae
- Genus: Mycteroperca
- Species: M. prionura

Binomial name
- Mycteroperca prionura Rosenblatt & Zahuranec, 1967

= Sawtail grouper =

Species of fish

The sawtail grouper (Mycteroperca prionura) is a species of marine ray-finned fish, a grouper from the subfamily Epinephelinae which is part of the family Serranidae, which also includes the anthias and sea basses. It is endemic to the western coasts of Mexico. The sawtail grouper commonly lives on fields of large boulders with gorgonians and black corals.

== Description ==
The sawtail grouper has a body which is elongated, robust and compressed, with its depth being the same at the origin of the dorsal fin as it is at the origin of the anal fin. The depth of the body is less than the length of the head. The preopercle is angular, with a serrated lobe its angle. The dorsal fin contains 11 spines and 16-18 soft rays while the anal fin contains 3 spines and 10-12 soft rays. The membranes between the dorsal fin spines are not incised. The caudal fin is rounded or truncate. The juveniles are pale grey or whitish in colour with small brown spots and a few bigger ellipsoid brown blotches. The adults are similar but have more numerous spots and the blotches are indistinct. This species attains a total length of 105 centimetres (41 in) and a maximum published weight of 14.1 kilograms (31 lb).

== Distribution ==
The sawtail grouper is found in the eastern Pacific Ocean where it is endemic to Mexico where it occurs from Baja California and the Gulf of California south to Puerto Vallarta.

== Habitat and biology ==
The sawtail grouper is found at depths from 10 to 90 metres (33 to 295 ft). It occurs in rocky reefs and it is commonest in areas where there are large boulders with gorgonians and black corals. This is a predatory species which feeds on small fishes in daytime and crustaceans at night. It is thought that it is a protogynous hermaphrodite with the older reproductively functional females changing to males. This is a very rare species and its behaviour is little known. It is known that they form spawning aggregations, frequently in association with Mycteroperca rosacea and these have been observed in April and May.

== Taxonomy ==
The sawtail grouper was first formally described in 1967 by the American ichthyologists Richard Heinrich Rosenblatt (1930-2014) and Bernard J. Zahuranec with the type locality given as the Inner Gorda Bank in Baja California Sur.

== Utilisation ==
The sawtail grouper is considered to be an excellent food fish and is an important target species, among other grouper species, for small scale fisheries in the northern Gulf of California. It is also a popular quarry for game fishing. Poachers fish illegally at night for sawtails grouper using spears, hookah breathing apparatus and lights, taking a significant number of fish.
