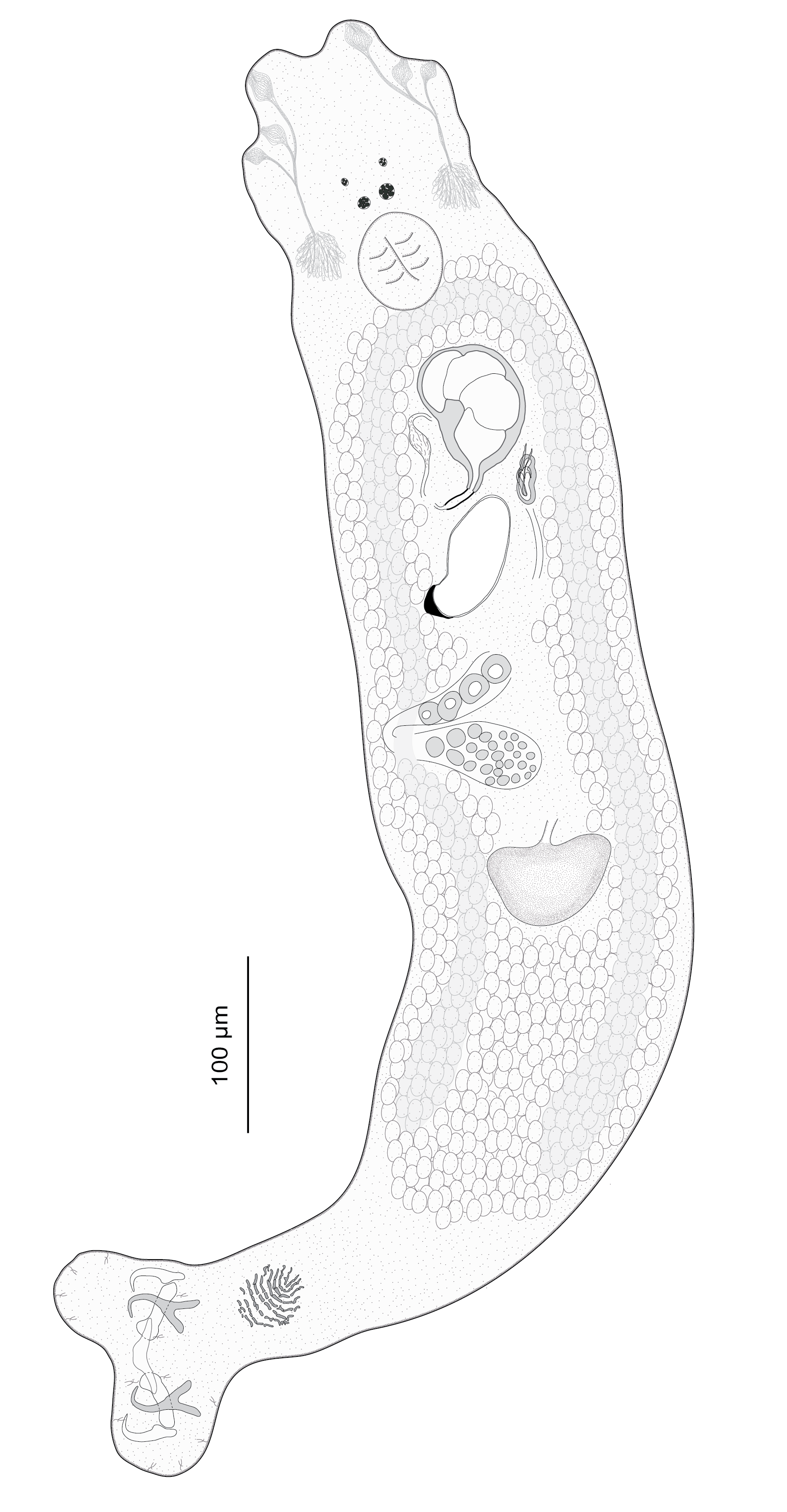
- Pseudorhabdosynochus regius

Scientific classification
- Kingdom: Animalia
- Phylum: Platyhelminthes
- Class: Monogenea
- Order: Dactylogyridea
- Family: Diplectanidae
- Genus: Pseudorhabdosynochus
- Species: P. regius

Binomial name
- Pseudorhabdosynochus regius Chaabane, Neifar & Justine, 2015

= Pseudorhabdosynochus regius =

Species of flatworm

Pseudorhabdosynochus regius is a diplectanid monogenean parasitic on the gills of the mottled grouper (Mycteroperca rubra).

== Etymology ==
The specific epithet, regius, is from the Latin adjective meaning "royal". It was given in reference to the French name of the type-host, Mérou royal.

== Description ==
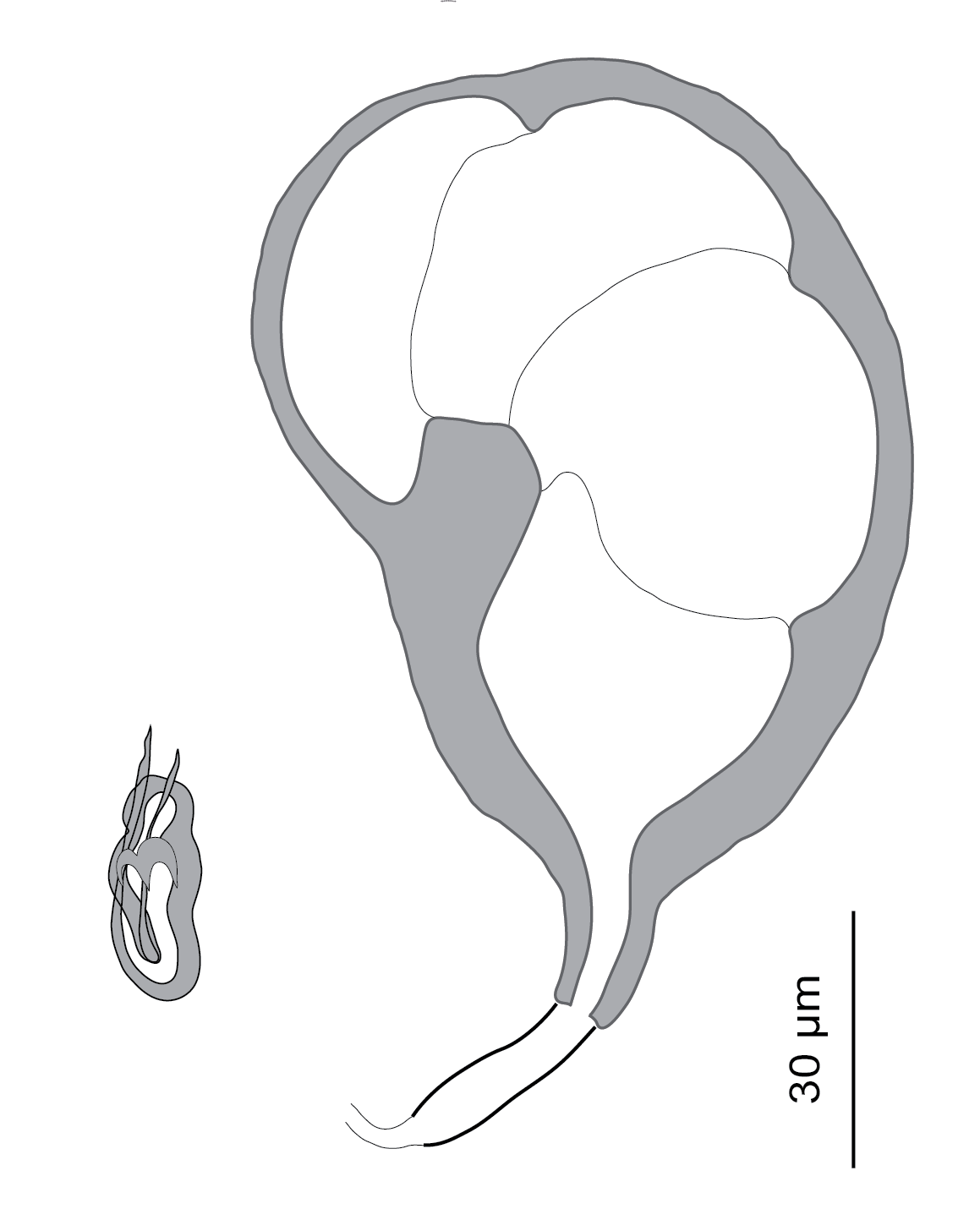
Sclerotized copulatory organs of Pseudorhabdosynochus regius (left, female; right, male)

Pseudorhabdosynochus regius is a small monogenean, about 600-1300 μm in length. The species has the general characteristics of other species of Pseudorhabdosynochus, with a flat body and a posterior haptor, which is the organ by which the monogenean attaches itself to the gill of is host. The haptor bears two squamodiscs, one ventral and one dorsal, which are small, with a length of 20-40 μm, and made up of only 10-11 rows of rodlets.

The sclerotized male copulatory organ, or "quadriloculate organ", has the shape of a bean with four internal chambers, as in other species of Pseudorhabdosynochus. The vagina includes a sclerotized part, which is a complex structure, 26-35 μm in length. It exhibits a trumpet in continuity with the primary canal, a straight primary canal, and primary and secondary chambers included in a common sclerotised mass along the primary canal. The sclerotised vagina is the structure used by systematicians to differentiate species of Pseudorhabdosynochus. The closest relatives of P. regius, based on the structure of its sclerotised vagina, are species mostly found in the Mediterranean Sea and parasites on species of Mycteroperca.

== Hosts and localities ==
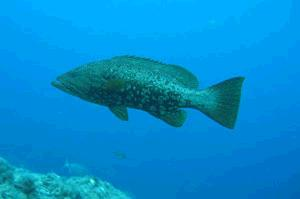
The mottled grouper (Mycteroperca rubra) is the host of Pseudorhabdosynochus regius

The type-host of Pseudorhabdosynochus regius is the grouper mottled grouper (Mycteroperca rubra) and the species has not been found in another host. The type-locality if off Dakar, Senegal. The monogenean has also been found on fish of the same species caught off Sfax, Tunisia and off Tripoli, Libya. Thus, P. regius is known from the Mediterranean Sea and the Eastern Atlantic. Only 14 species of diplectanids parasitic on groupers are known in the Mediterranean Sea and P. regius is one of them.

== Gallery ==
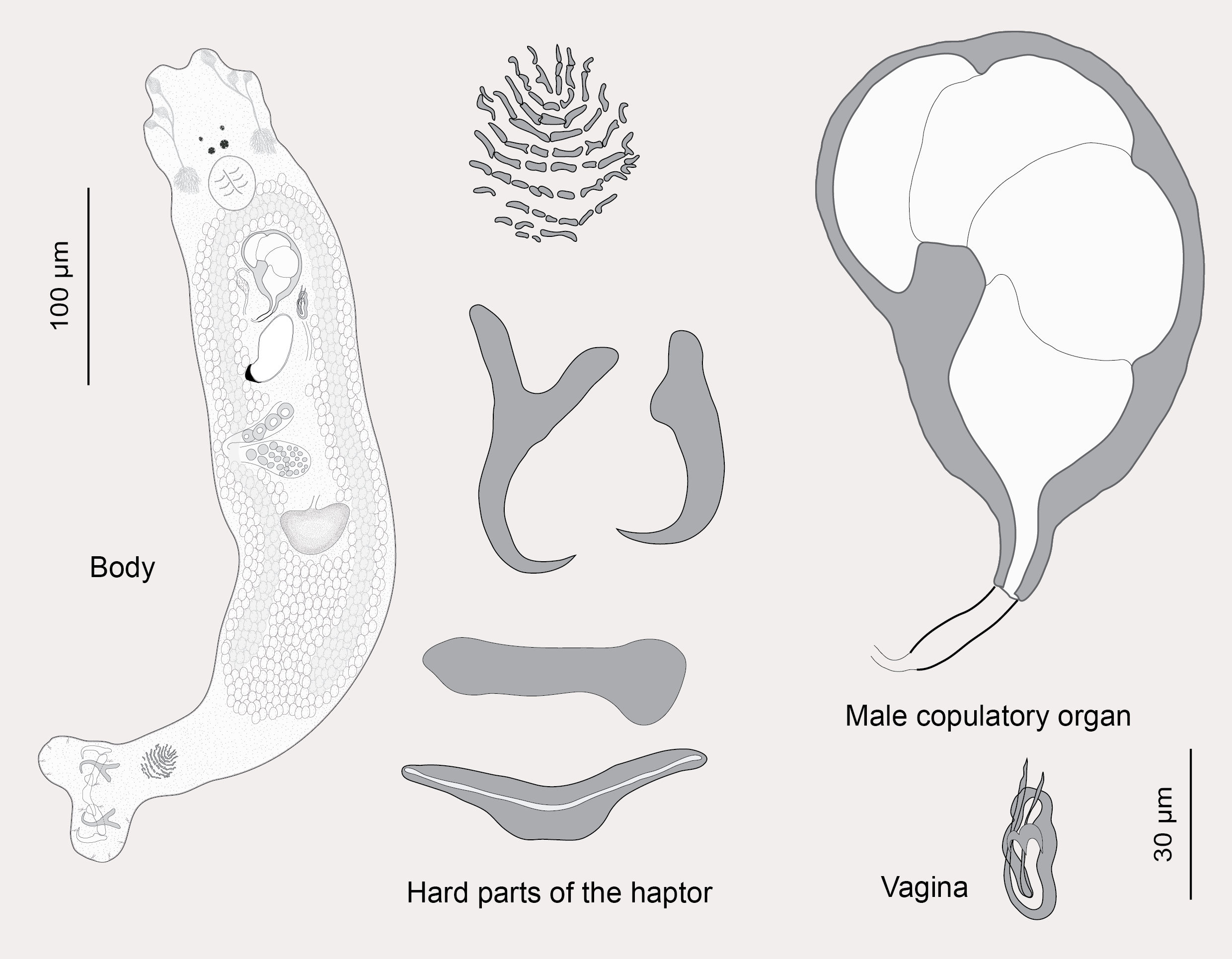
Pseudorhabdosynochus regius - with captions for parts and organs

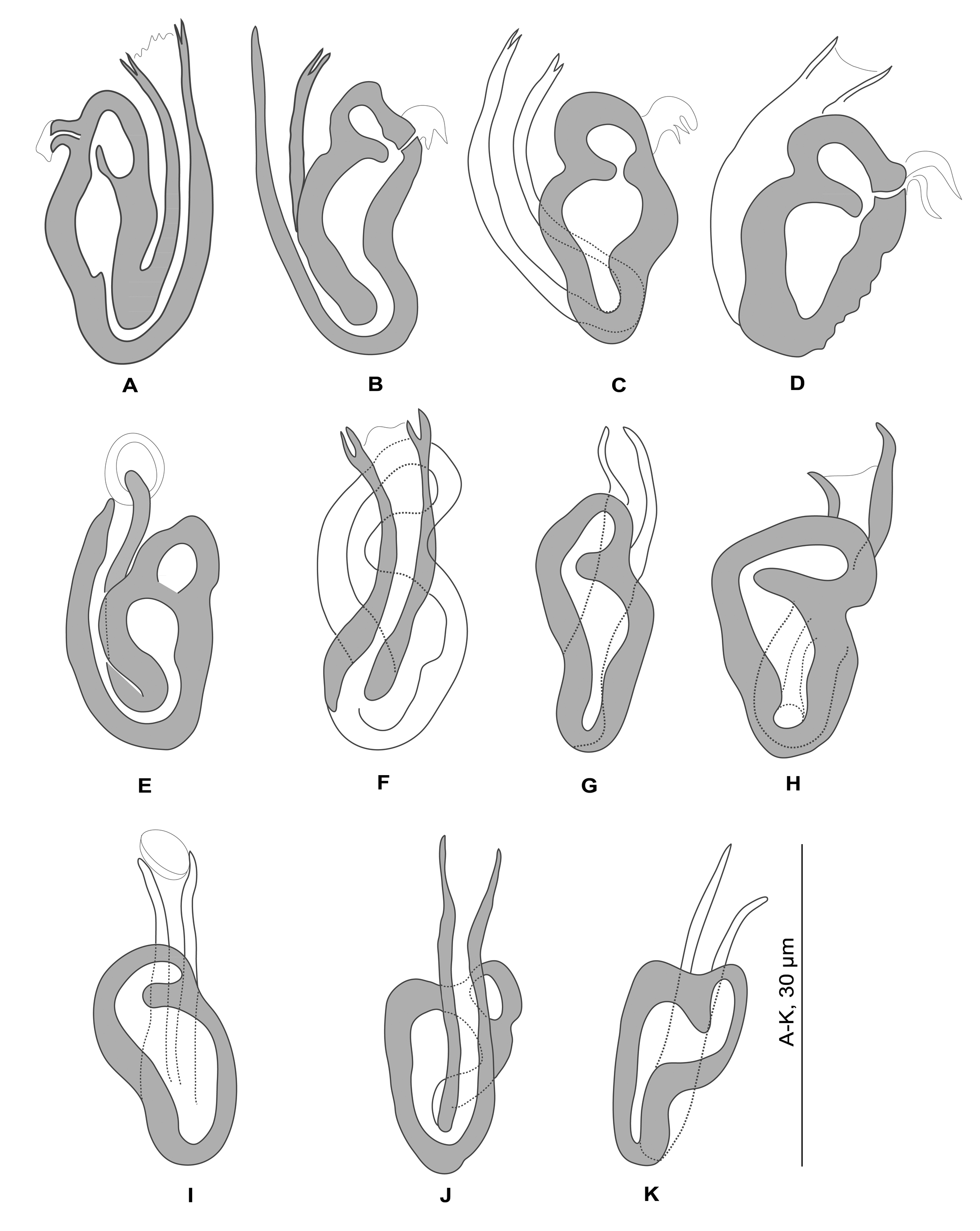
Sclerotised vaginae of various specimens

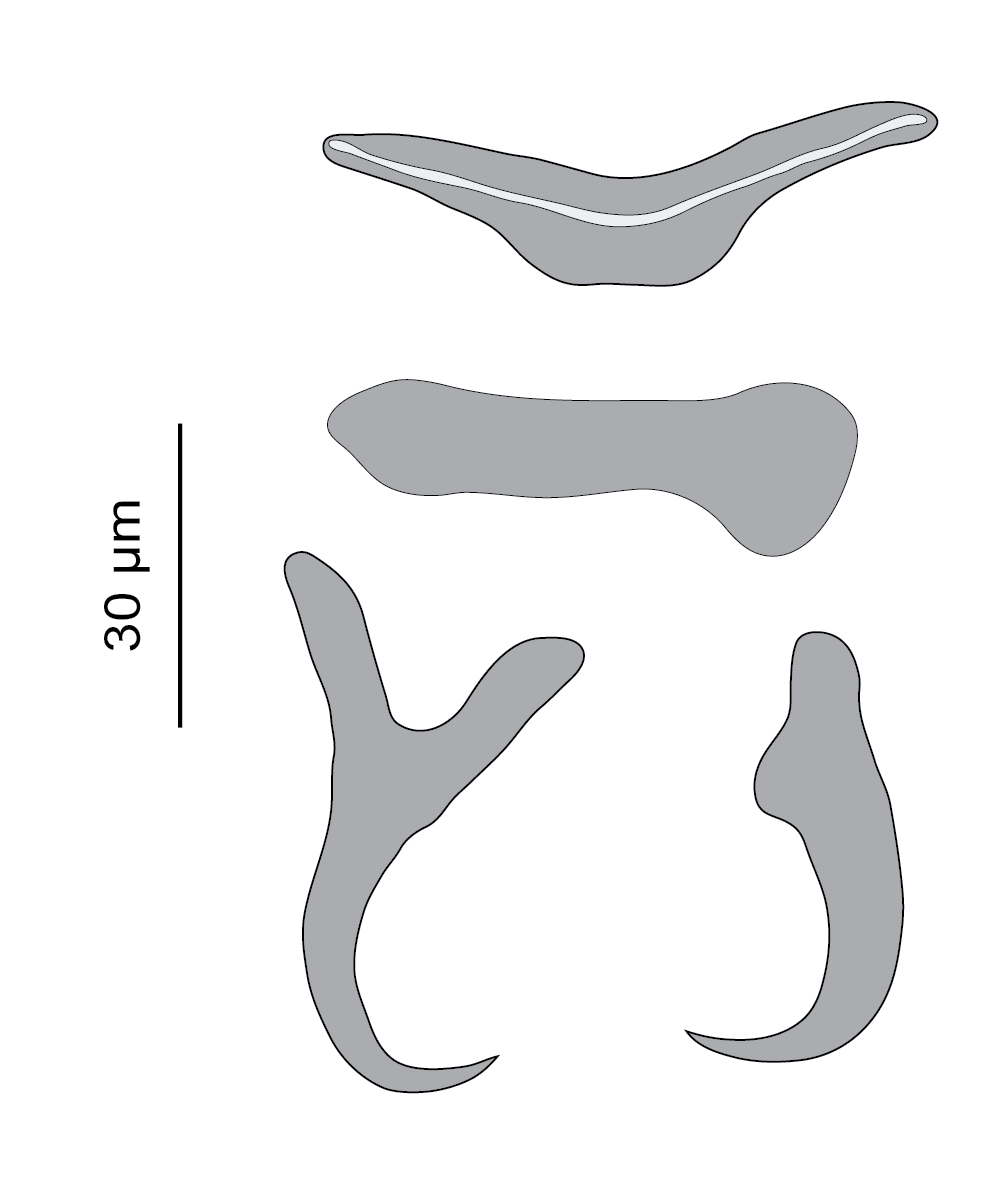
Hard parts of the haptor

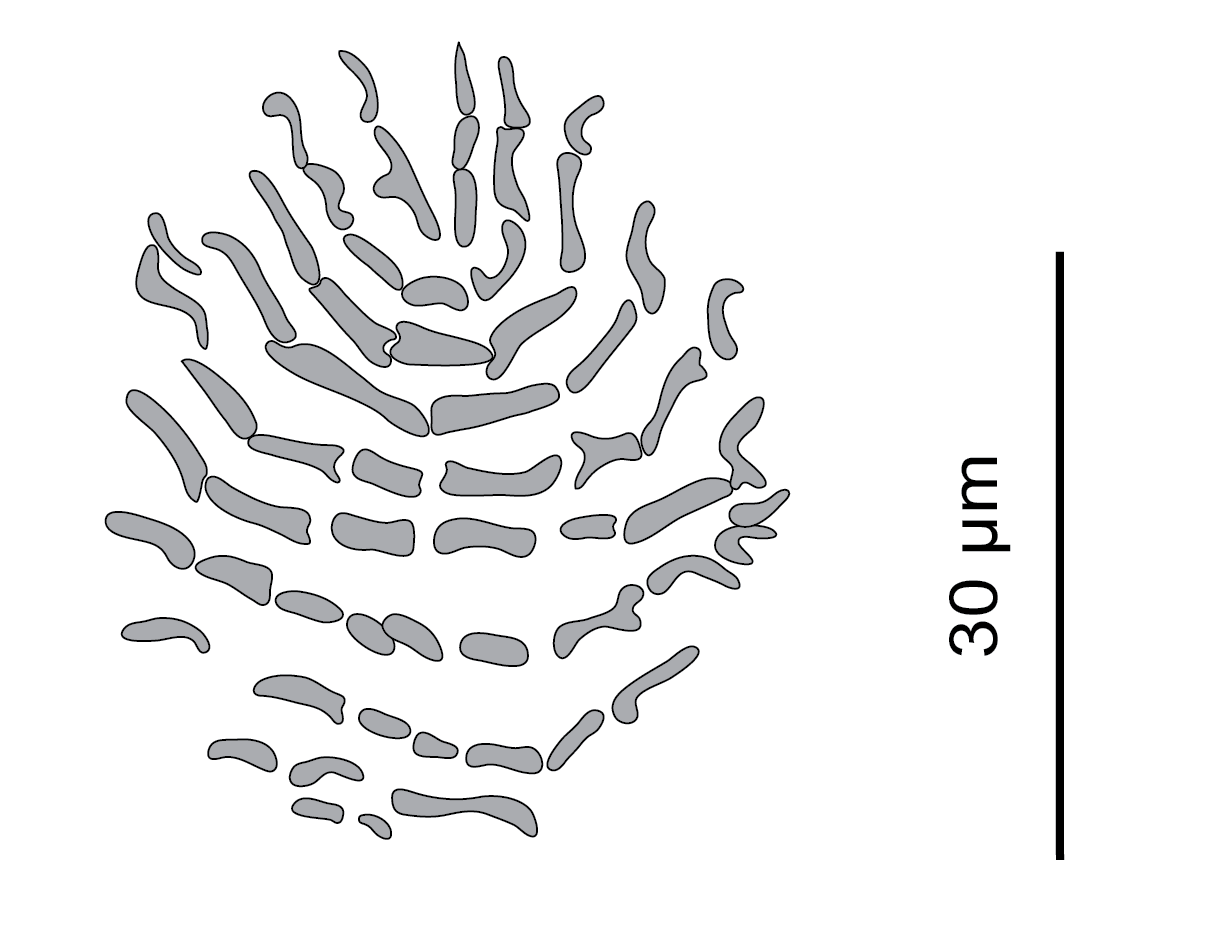
Ventral squamodisc
