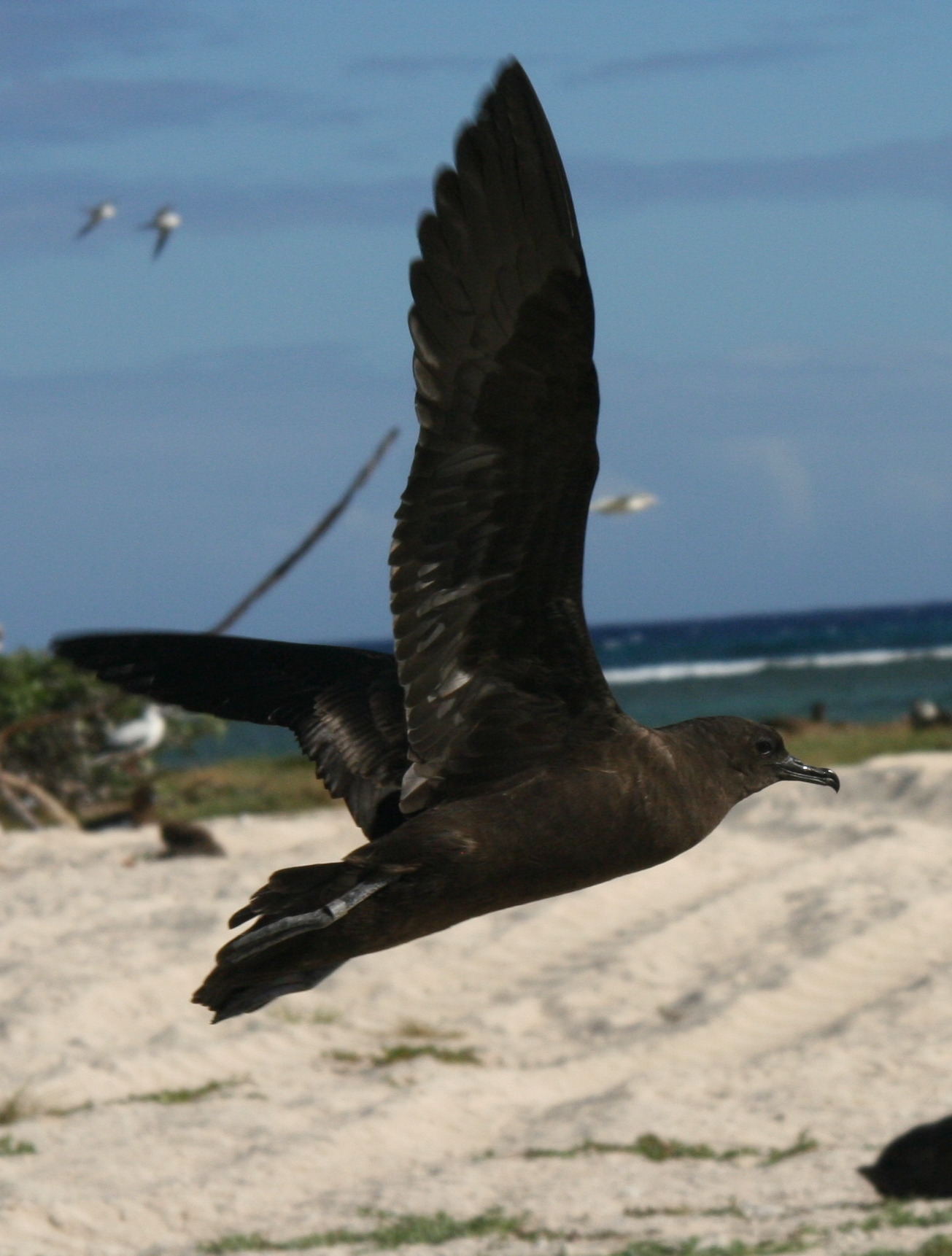
- Adult taking off, French Frigate Shoals

Conservation status
- Least Concern (IUCN 3.1)

Scientific classification
- Kingdom: Animalia
- Phylum: Chordata
- Class: Aves
- Order: Procellariiformes
- Family: Procellariidae
- Genus: Puffinus
- Species: P. nativitatis

Binomial name
- Puffinus nativitatis Streets, 1877

= Christmas shearwater =

Species of bird

The Christmas shearwater or ʻaoʻū (Puffinus nativitatis) is a medium-sized shearwater of the tropical Central Pacific. It is a poorly known species due to its remote nesting habits, and it has not been extensively studied at sea either.

It is one member of a very ancient lineage of the small Puffinus species. Its only close living relative is the Galápagos shearwater (P. subalaris).

== Taxonomy ==
The species was described and given its current binomial name by the American naturalist Thomas Hale Streets in 1877. A genetic analysis using mitochondrial DNA has shown that the closest living relative is the Galápagos shearwater (Puffinus subalaris).

== Description ==
The Christmas shearwater is a slender-bodied shearwater, about 36 cm long, with a wingspan of around 75 cm, and weighs around 350 g. It has dark plumage all over, generally blackish-grey with a rusty-brown tinge, slightly paler on the underside of the bird, and with some small edging of white under the chin and pale fringes to the upperwing coverts. It has brown-grey feet and a dark bill and eyes. Both sexes are alike, as are the young after fledging. Nestlings are covered in dark grey down feathers.

The species closely resembles the sooty (Puffinus griseus) and short-tailed shearwaters (P. tenuirostris), but has dark brown underwings and is smaller. The short tail of the Christmas shearwater does not appear blunt except when spread, but in flight usually tapers to a point, enhanced by the feet which protrude beyond the tail-tip. It often flies in a leisurely way like the related Procellariidae, and thus can be mistaken for a petrel. In particular, it can appear similar to the extremely rare Fiji petrel (Pseudobulweria macgillivrayi), a gadfly petrel-like relative of the shearwaters. The two species share a similar morphology and colouration, but the bulbous head and rather thin long bill – typical for shearwaters – distinguish P. nativitatis from the slim-headed thick-billed Fiji petrel.

== Distribution and habitat ==
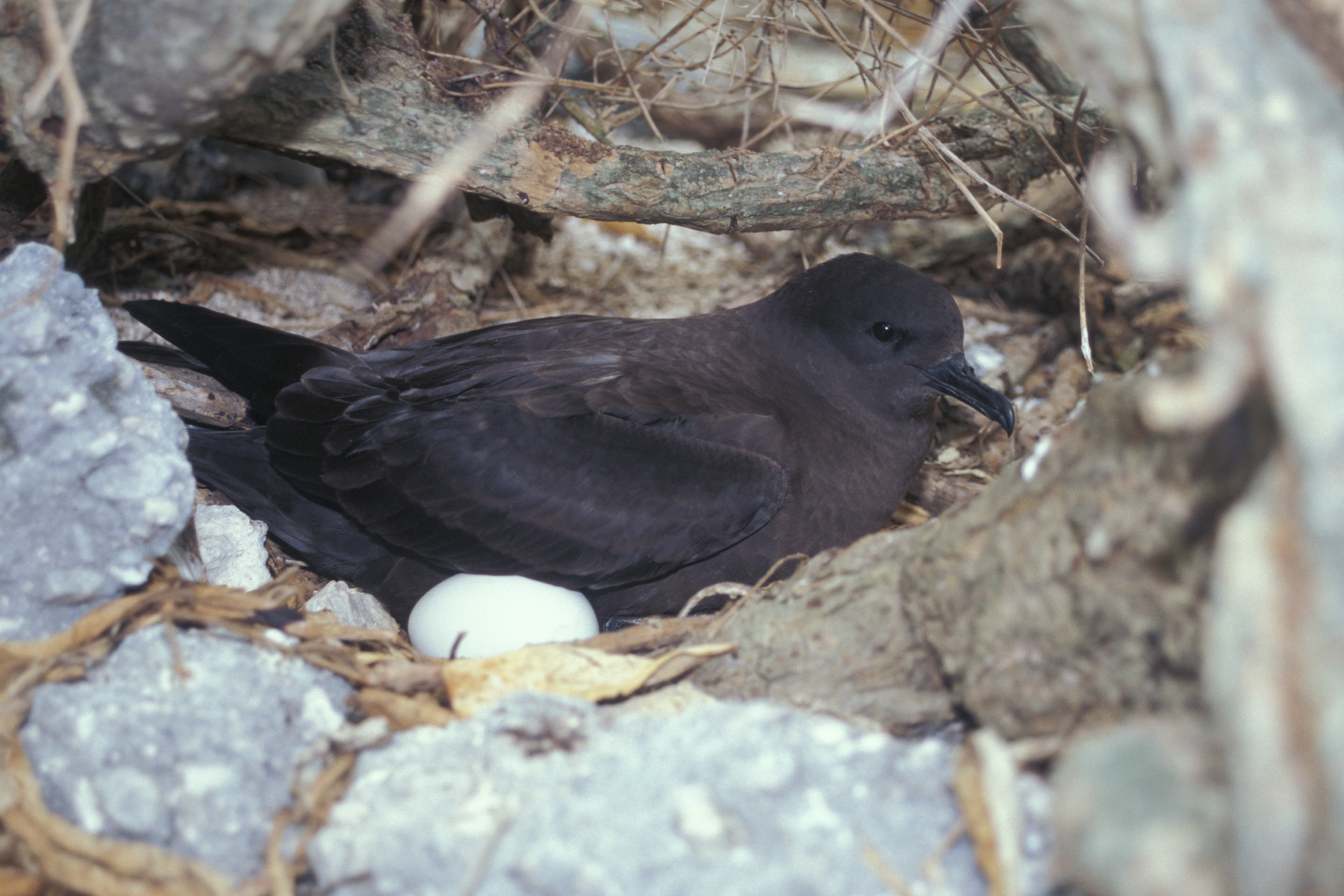
Breeding adult with its single egg, Eastern Island of Midway Atoll

The Christmas shearwater nests on remote islands of the Central Pacific: the Northwestern Hawaiian Islands, Tuamotu, the Marshall Islands, Kiritimati (for which the species is named) and Sala-y-Gómez. It has become locally extinct on a number of islands, including Wake Island. Outside of the breeding season it ranges across the Pacific, having been recorded off the coast of Mexico and Guatemala in the east, and Bonin Islands in the west. Further south it is rare, having been recorded off Fiji only twice (one time in early to mid-May).

== Behaviour ==
=== Diet and feeding ===
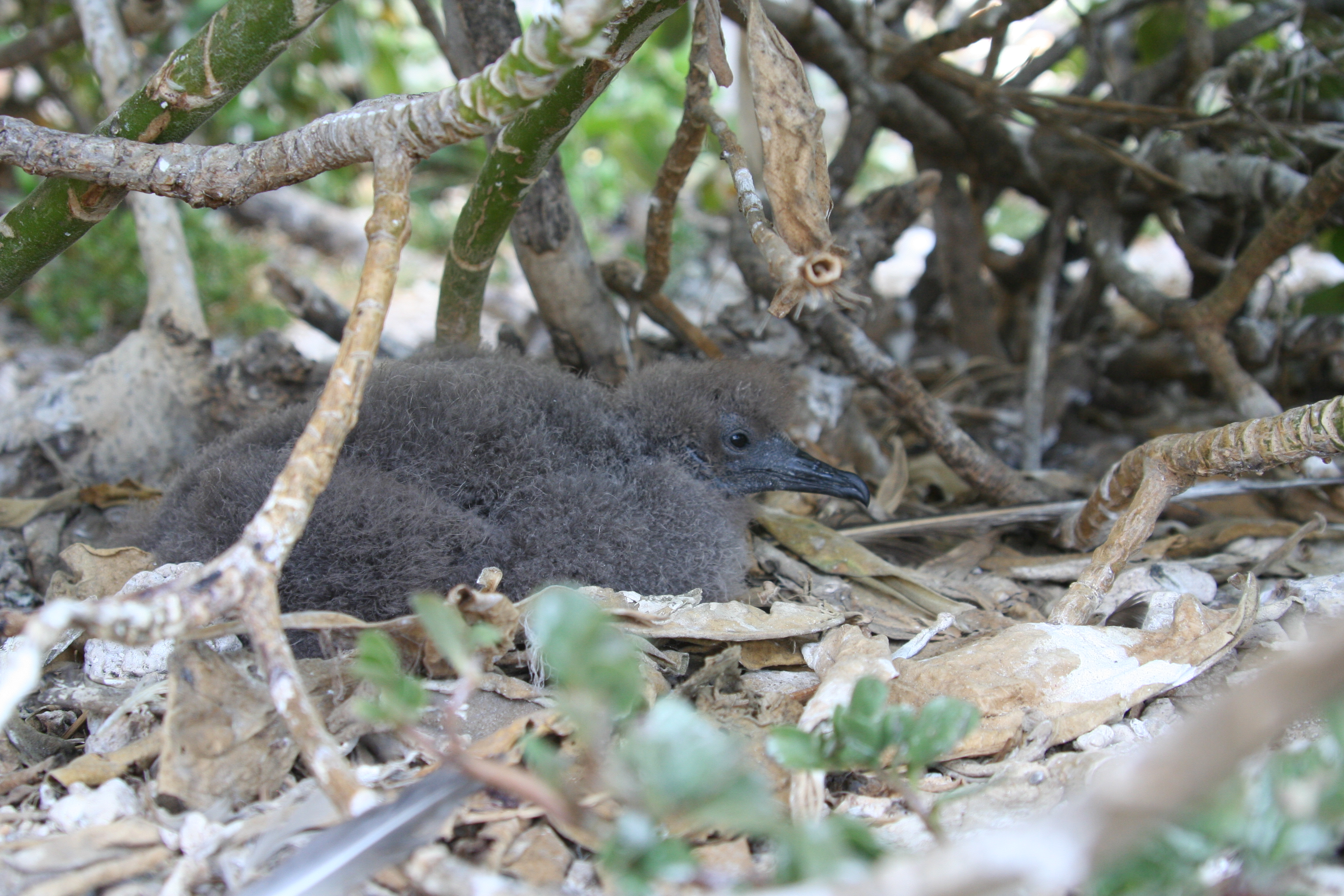
Nestling in the Northwestern Hawaiian Islands

Like its relatives it feeds at sea, predominantly on squid, and fish, mostly flying fish (Exocoetidae) and goatfish (Mullidae). It is highly pelagic and is dependent on predatory fish such as tuna driving prey to the surface. As mentioned above, it does not only have the dramatic stiff-winged "shearing" (dynamic soaring) flight technique which gave the shearwaters their common name. In addition to it, it may use the plesiomorphic flight technique of petrels and similar Procellariidae, moving about with slow, leisurely wingbeats.

=== Breeding ===
The Christmas shearwater nests on sandy islands with good cover. It nests on the surface, underneath dense cover (such as naupakas, Scaevola), or under rock outcroppings. It lays one white egg, the timing of laying varying from island to island, on some islands breeding throughout the year. The egg is incubated for around 50 days. The time taken to fledge varies depending on the season, ranging from 60 to 100 days.

=== Status and conservation ===
Although few specific studies have been conducted on the Christmas shearwaters, petrels and shearwaters are threatened worldwide by fishing, ingestion of plastic waste, and habitat degradation. For example, on Laysan Island the introduced rabbits degraded the scrub cover, leaving adults, chicks and eggs vulnerable to overheating, and introduced black rats took eggs and chicks. In 1985, the population on Sala-y-Gómez, a nature sanctuary, was estimated at 5,000. With its wide range and considerable numbers, the Christmas shearwater is considered a species of least concern by the IUCN.
