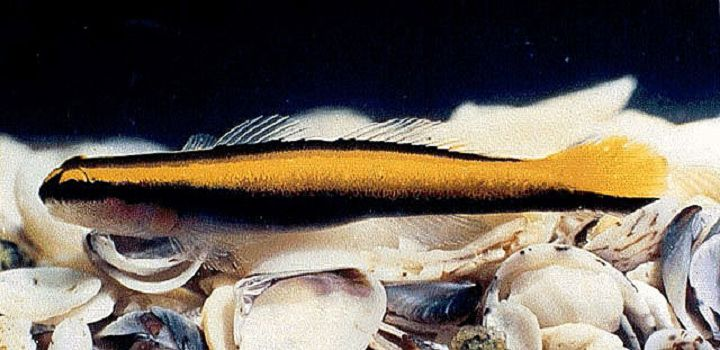

Scientific classification
- Kingdom: Animalia
- Phylum: Chordata
- Class: Actinopterygii
- Order: Gobiiformes
- Family: Gobiidae
- Genus: Elacatinus
- Species: E. figaro

Binomial name
- Elacatinus figaro Sazima, Moura & Rosa, 1997

= Elacatinus figaro =

Species of fish

Elacatinus figaro, the barber goby or yellow line goby, is a colourful species of marine goby, family Gobiidae, from the southwestern Atlantic, where it is endemic to the coastal waters of Brazil.

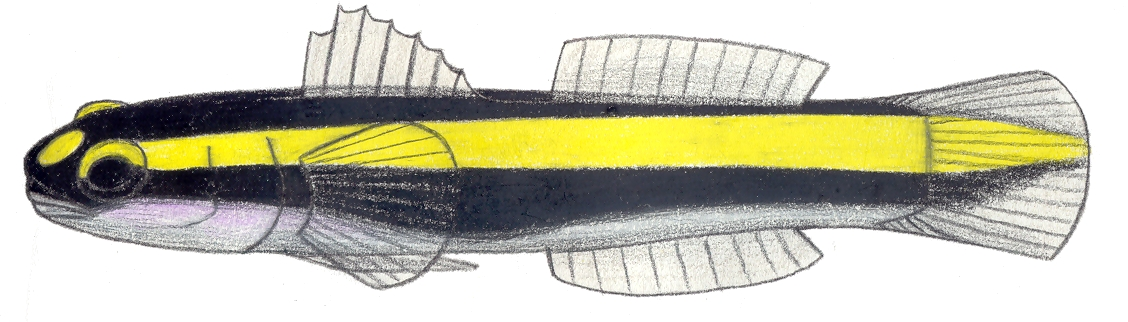
Elacatinus figaro

== Description ==
E. figaro is dark in colour with yellow ventral and dorsal stripes and opaque blue pectoral fins. It has a terminal mouth and the pelvic fins are merged to form a suction cup. They are normally 2.5-3.4 cm in length.

== Distribution ==
The barber goby is endemic to the waters off Brazil, where it occurs from Santa Catarina in the south to Pedra do Sal in Piauí in the north.

== Biology ==
E. figaro is found over substrates made up of coral and rocky either just off the coast of mainland Brazil or off inshore islands at depths of 3–20 m. It occurs either solitarily or in small groups of up to six fish over coral heads, among encrusting algae and crustose sponges, or in the vicinity of sea urchins, retreating to seek protection among the spines if threatened. It feeds mainly by cleaning other fish, e.g. Ophioblennius atlanticus, Abudefduf saxatilis, Mycteroperca rubra, and Mycteroperca acutirostris.

== Conservation ==
The Ministério do Meio Ambiente Red List of Brazilian Fauna published in 2014 lists E.s figaro as a threatened species, and recommends that it fits the vulnerable category of International Union for Conservation of Nature's IUCN Red List of Endangered Species. The export of E. figaro from Brazil is illegal, which means that captive-bred specimens are the only ones which can be legally sold within the aquarium trade.

== Naming ==
The generic name Elacatinus is from Greek elakatines which means fusiform fishes preserved in salt, while the specific name figaro references Pierre Beaumarchais's title character in the play The Barber of Seville. The type specimen was taken at Pedra Do Navio, Ilha Anchieta, Ubatuba, state of São Paulo by I. Sazima, R. Moura and C. Sazima, and the description was published in April 1997 in Aqua: Journal of Ichthyology and Aquatic Biology Volume 5, Issue 3, pp. 33–38.
