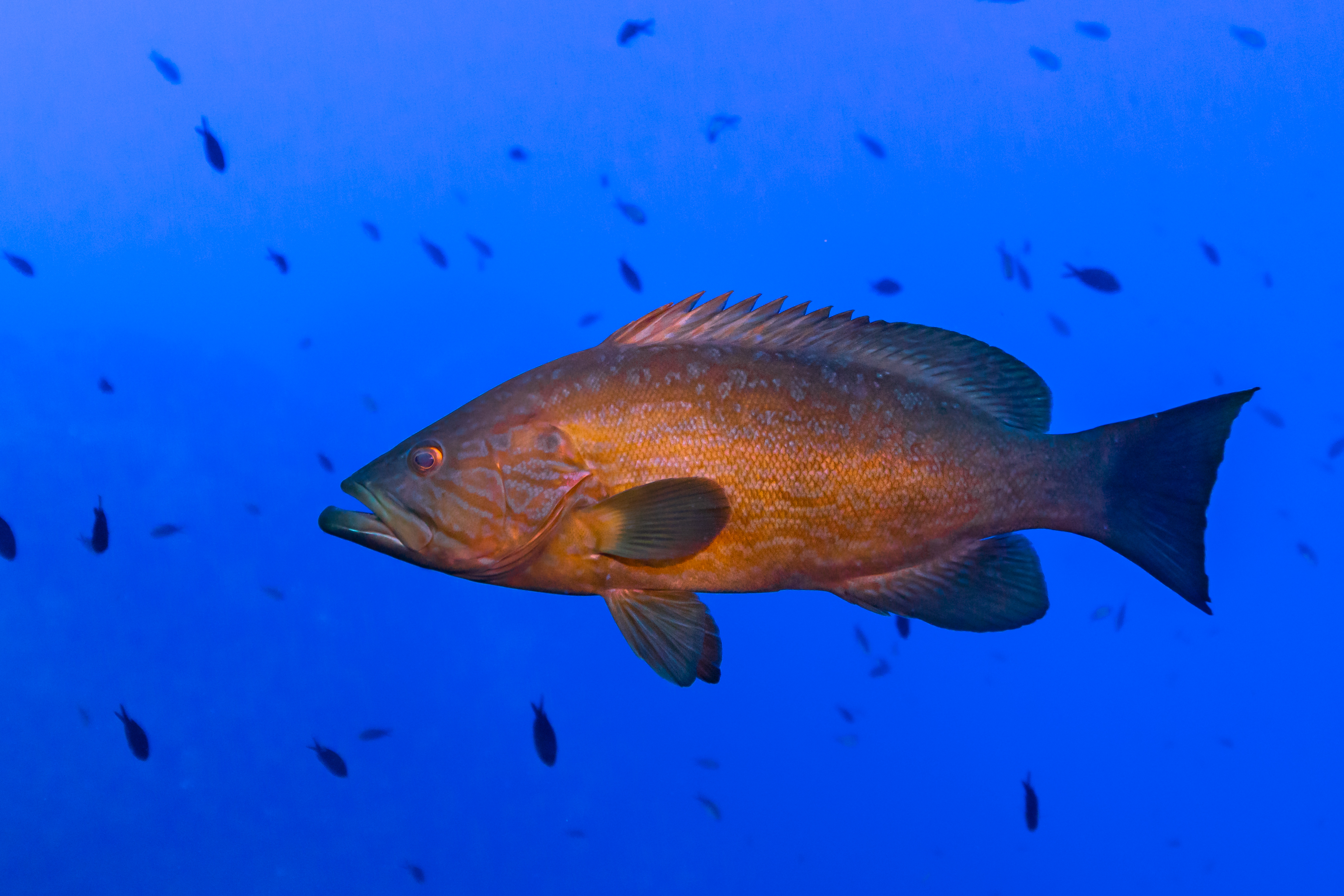

Conservation status
- Least Concern (IUCN 3.1)

Scientific classification
- Kingdom: Animalia
- Phylum: Chordata
- Class: Actinopterygii
- Division: Teleostei
- Order: Perciformes
- Family: Epinephelidae
- Genus: Mycteroperca
- Species: M. rubra

Binomial name
- Mycteroperca rubra (Bloch, 1793)

Synonyms
- Epinephelus ruber Bloch, 1793; Sparus scirenga Rafinesque, 1810; Mycteroperca scirenga (Rafinesque, 1810); Serranus tinca Cantraine, 1833; Serranus nebulosus Cocco, 1833; Serranus emarginatus Valenciennes, 1843; Cerna macrogenis Sassi, 1846; Serranus armatus Osório, 1893

= Mottled grouper =

Species of fish

The mottled grouper (Mycteroperca rubra) is a species of marine ray-finned fish, a grouper from the subfamily Epinephelinae which is part of the family Serranidae, which also includes the anthias and sea basses. It is found in the eastern Atlantic Ocean and the Mediterranean Sea.

== Description ==
The mottled grouper has an oblong, compressed body which has a depth which is less than the length of its head, its standard length is 2.8 to 3.2 times its depth. The preopercle has a serrated margin with the serrations being enlarged at its angle, where there is a rounded lobe below an incision into the margin. The dorsal fin contains 11 spines and 15-17 soft rays while the anal fin contains 3 spines and 11-12 soft rays. The caudal fin is truncate in juveniles and subadults but it is concave in adults with a standard length of more than 50 centimetres (20 in). They are usually reddish brown in colour, often mottled with black or pale grey spots and having a black streak above the upper jaw. The juveniles have a black saddle blotch on the caudal peduncle. This species has a maximum published total length of 144 centimetres (57 in), although a more common total length is 80 centimetres (31 in), while the maximum published weight is 49.7 kilograms (110 lb).

== Distribution ==
The mottle grouper is found in the eastern Atlantic Ocean and parts of the Mediterranean Sea. In the eastern Atlantic, it is found from southern Portugal and Spain, along the western coast of Africa as far south as Angola. It was formerly found in the southern Mediterranean from southern Spain and Morocco to Egypt and Israel but it has been expanding its range and is now found as far north as Provence in France and the Adriatic Sea. It is absent from the Black Sea and records from the Macaronesian Islands are misidentifications of Island grouper (Mycteroperca fusca) and records from Brazil are similarly misidentifications of the comb grouper M. acutirostris.

== Habitat and biology ==
The mottled grouper is a demersal species which occurs over rocky reefs and adjacent sandy substrates as deep as 200 metres (660 ft). It tens to be commoner at shallower depths from 1 to 30 metres (3.3 to 98.4 ft) in the eastern Mediterranean. It readily takes to artificial reefs such as shipwrecks off Sicily. Juveniles are usually found in shallower inshore waters. It feeds on molluscs and small fishes. It is a protogynous hermaphrodite, the transition from female to male happens when they are nine years oold and have attained a total length of 53 centimetres (21 in). The females reach sexual maturity at a total length of about 27 to 32 centimetres (11 to 13 in) around four and five years of age. Spawning aggregations have been recorded off Israel, Senegal, Turkey and Corsica.

== Parasites ==
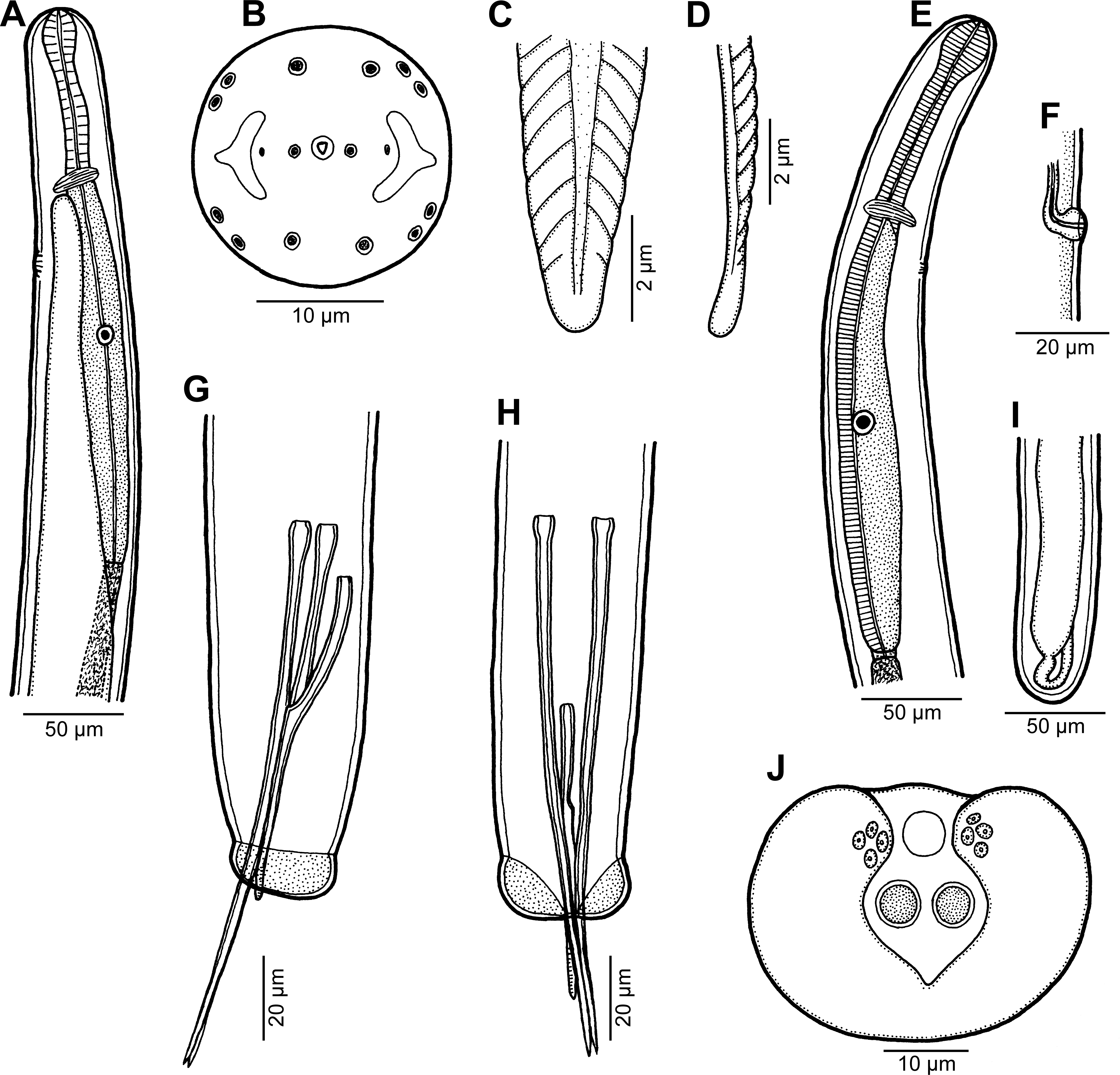
Philometra inexpectata, a nematode parasite of the mottled grouper

As most fish, the mottled grouper harbours a variety of parasites. These include the diplectanid monogenean Pseudorhabdosynochus regius on the gills and the philometrid nematode Philometra inexpectatata in the gonad.

== Taxonomy ==
The mottled grouper was first formally described in 1793 as Epinephelus ruber by the German naturalist Marcus Elieser Bloch (1723-1799) with the type locality given as "Japan", probably an error for Europe or the Mediterranean.

== Utilisation ==
The mottled grouper is not caught commercially because of its scarcity in the Mediterranean but is more commonly caught off Africa.
