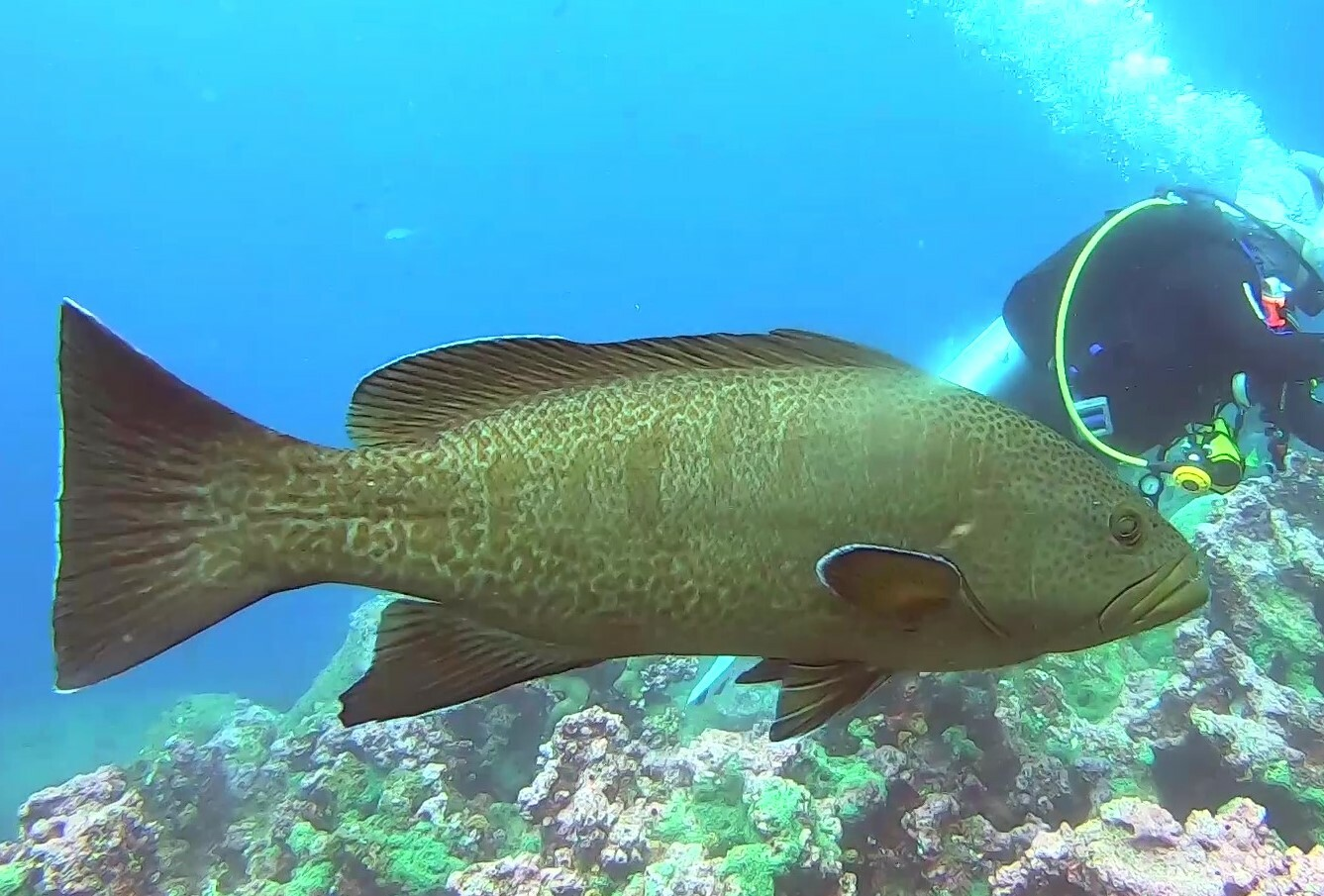

Conservation status
- Vulnerable (IUCN 3.1)

Scientific classification
- Kingdom: Animalia
- Phylum: Chordata
- Class: Actinopterygii
- Division: Teleostei
- Order: Perciformes
- Family: Epinephelidae
- Genus: Mycteroperca
- Species: M. olfax

Binomial name
- Mycteroperca olfax (Jenyns, 1843)

Synonyms
- Serranus olfax Jenyns, 1840

= Sailfin grouper =

Species of fish

The sailfin grouper (Mycteroperca olfax), also known as the bacalao grouper, colorado grouper or yellow grouper, is a species of marine ray-finned fish, a grouper from the subfamily Epinephelinae which is part of the family Serranidae, which also includes the anthias and sea basses. It is found off islands in the eastern Pacific.

== Taxonomy ==
The sailfin grouper was first formally described as Serranus olfax in 1843 by the English clergyman, author and naturalist Leonard Jenyns (1800-1893) with the type locality given as San Cristóbal Island in the Galapagos. In 1862 the American zoologist Theodore Nicholas Gill (1837-1914) placed it in the monotypic genus Mycteroperca, which has since been expanded to include 14 other species, and M. olfax is therefore its type species.

== Distribution ==
The sailfin grouper is found in the eastern Pacific Ocean where it occurs in the waters off the Galapagos Islands of Ecuador, Cocos Island in Costa Rica and Malpelo Island of Colombia. Vagrants have been recorded sporadically along the coast between Costa Rica and Peru.

== Description ==
This species attains a total length of 120 centimetres (47 in). The body is elongate, robust and compressed with its depth being the same at the origin of the dorsal fin as it is at the origin of the anal fin. The standard length is 2.9 to 3.1 times the body's depth. The preopercle is angular, with a serrated lobe at its angle. The dorsal fin contains 11 spines and 16-17 soft rays while the anal fin contains 3 spines and 11 soft rays. The membranes between the dorsal fin spines are not deeply notched and the soft rayed part of the dorsal fin is rounded. The caudal fin is emarginate in adults and truncate in juveniles.

The head and body are normally pale grey-brown in colour with numerous, closely set brown spots and they sometimes have 10-12 thin dark bars, which may be broken, on the upper body. The fin margins are dark, with narrow white borders. Occasionally they are entirely bright yellow in colour.

== Habitat and biology ==
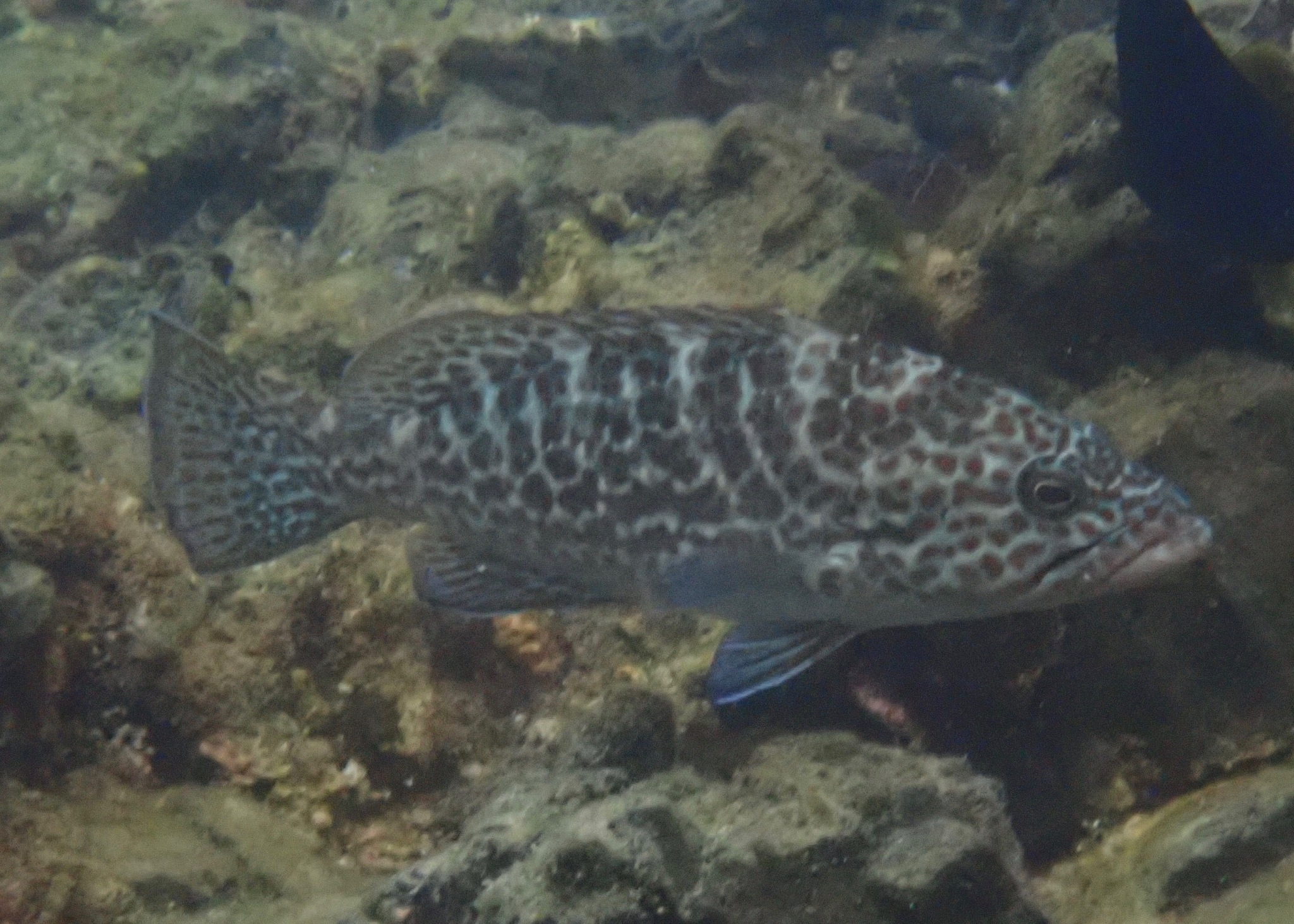
In Ecuador

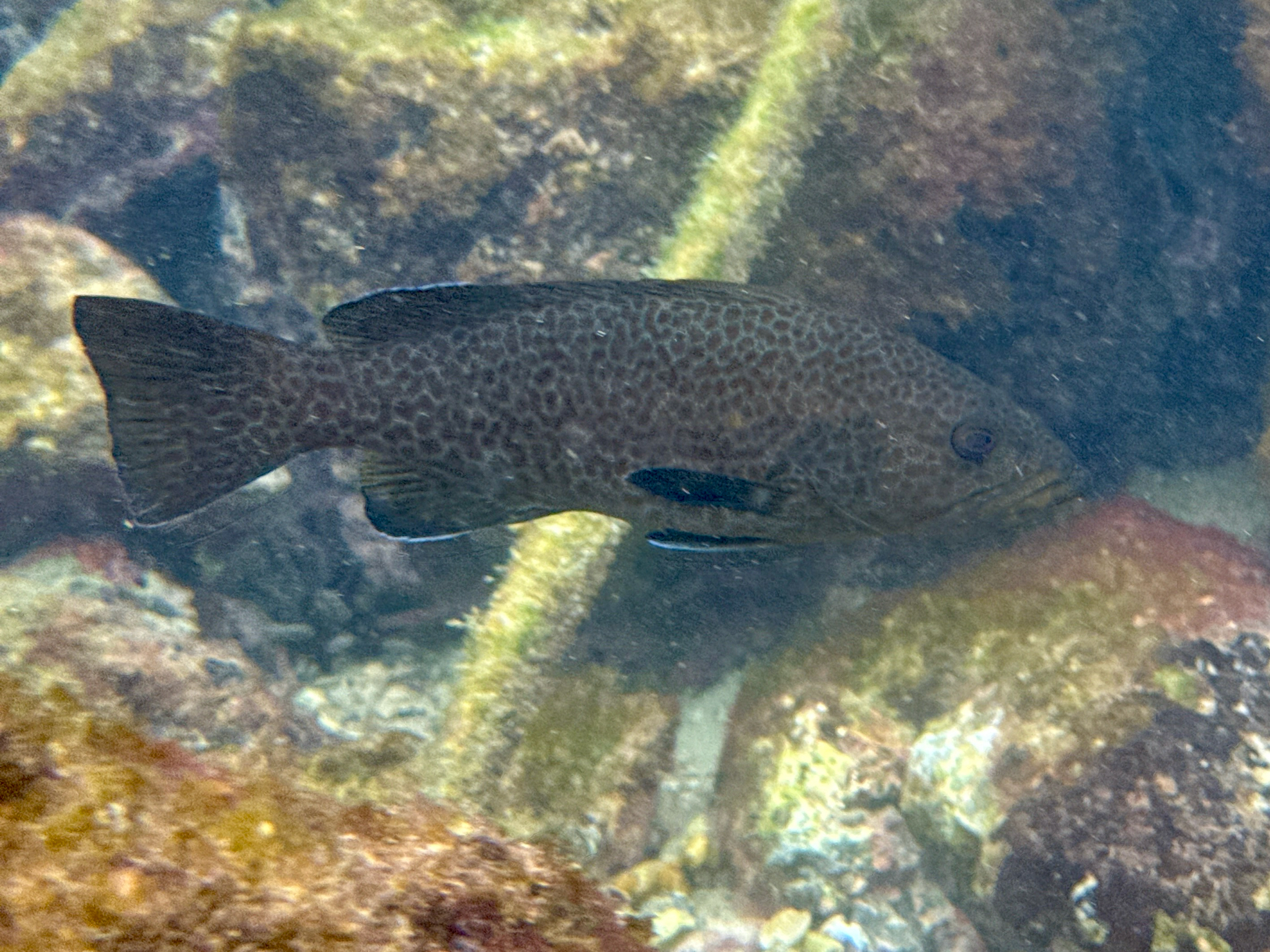
In Ecuador

The sailfin grouper occurs along rock walls, over rocky reef drop-offs, underwater lava ridges and around other vertical rock formations as adults, the juveniles have been recorded from shallow sandy lagoons, sea grass beds, mangrove lagoons, shallow lava reefs and even inland lava ponds. The adults are piscivorous and the main prey of the larger adults is the pacific creolefish (Paranthias colonus). The females become sexually mature at 4 years of age and with a total length of around 47.5 centimetres (18.7 in). The transition to males takes place around 12 year of age and when the total length is 83.7 centimetres (33.0 in). The skewed sex ratio and lack of small males suggests that this species is a monandric protogynous hermaphrodite but this has not been confirmed histologically. Spawning has been observed from October until April, peaking in October and December, and aggregations have been recorded. Outside the spawning season the malesa and females appear to be ecologically separated with the males further offshore than the females.

== Utilisation ==
The sailfin grouper is the commonest and most valuable finfish landed in the Galápagos by the artisanal handline fishery and has been since the Norwegians introduced the butterfly method of salting and drying fish that gives bacalao (known as cod in Spanish) its name in the late 1920s. The dried flesh is exported to the mainland Ecuador where it is used in a traditional Easter dish called fanesca. The fishery operates throughout the year but it peaks from October until April when the demand is at its peak in the lead up to Easter. In 2008 it was reported that fishing effort was being reduced as fishers targeted the more valuable sea cucumber and lobster stocks. Sailfin groupers are also targeted by recreational game fishing tourists.
