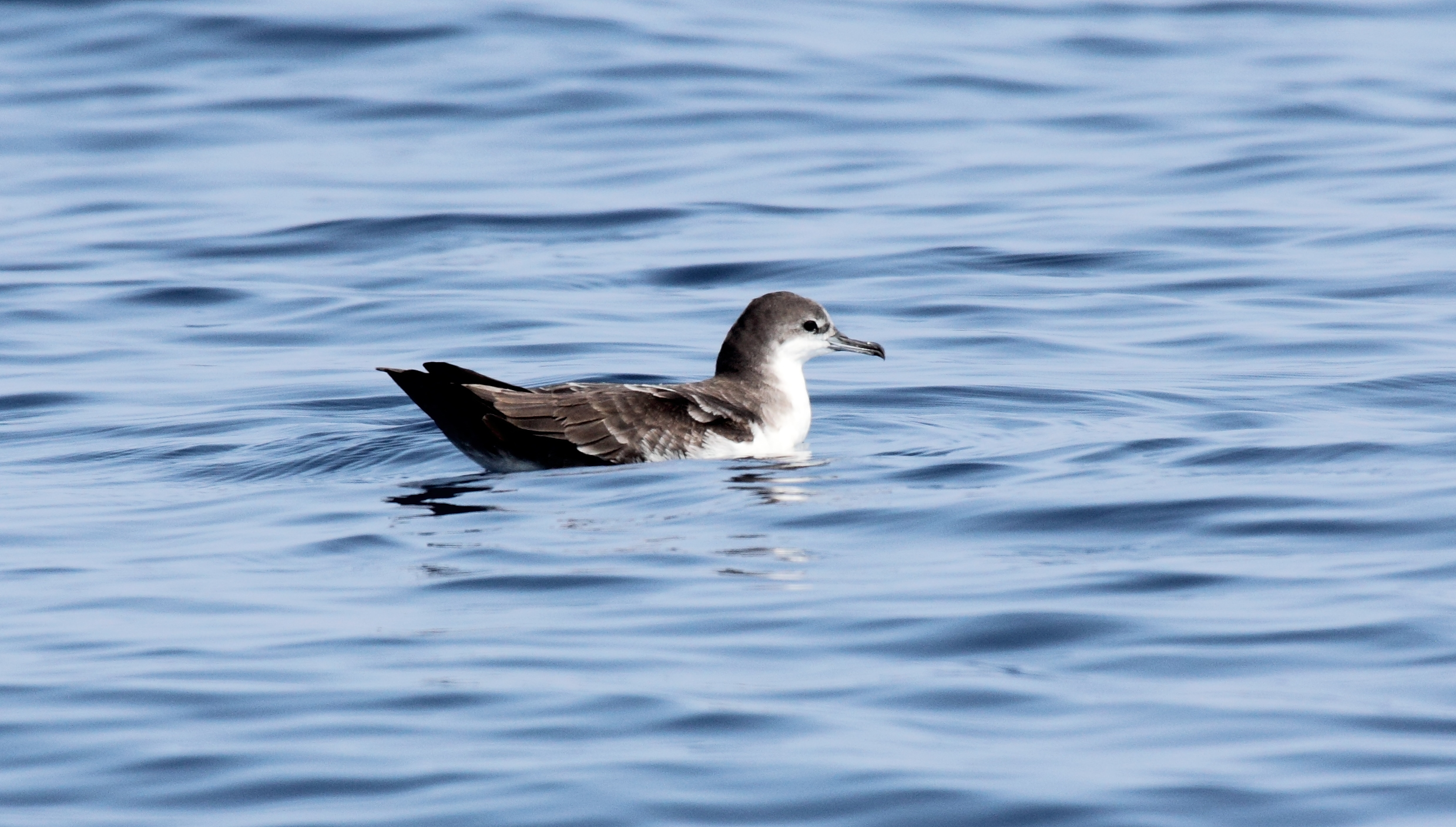

Conservation status
- Least Concern (IUCN 3.1)

Scientific classification
- Kingdom: Animalia
- Phylum: Chordata
- Class: Aves
- Order: Procellariiformes
- Family: Procellariidae
- Genus: Puffinus
- Species: P. subalaris

Binomial name
- Puffinus subalaris Ridgway, 1897

Synonyms
- Puffinus lherminieri subalaris

= Galápagos shearwater =

Species of bird

The Galápagos shearwater (Puffinus subalaris) is a small shearwater. Until recently it was considered to be a subspecies of Audubon's shearwater, but it is actually one of two members of a very ancient lineage of the small Puffinus species, the other being, as indicated by mtDNA cytochrome b sequence data, the Christmas shearwater.

It is an endemic breeder of the Galápagos Islands, and is largely sedentary, although individuals are commonly seen as far as the Oaxacan coast of Mexico.

== Description ==
The Galápagos shearwater has dark brown upperparts, undertail and underwing flight feathers, the rest of the underparts plumage being white. It sometimes has a dark collar. Both sexes are alike, as are the young after fledging.

It is a slender-bodied shearwater, about 29–31 cm long, with a wingspan of around 63 cm and weighs 123-225 g. The species closely resembles the tropical shearwater, although the latter is typically blacker and has a longer tail.

== Behaviour ==
The Galápagos shearwater is a gregarious species and will feed at sea with other shearwaters and boobies. It flies low over the water and feeds on squid, fish and offal. It intersperses 4-10 stiff wing beats with shallow glides.
