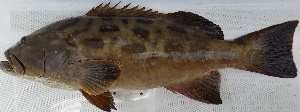

Conservation status
- Endangered (IUCN 3.1)

Scientific classification
- Kingdom: Animalia
- Phylum: Chordata
- Class: Actinopterygii
- Division: Teleostei
- Order: Perciformes
- Family: Epinephelidae
- Genus: Mycteroperca
- Species: M. jordani

Binomial name
- Mycteroperca jordani (Jenkins & Evermann, 1889)

Synonyms
- Epinephelus jordani Jenkins & Evermann, 1889; Mycteroperca venadorum Jordan & Starks, 1895

= Gulf grouper =

Species of fish

The Gulf grouper (Mycteroperca jordani) is a species of marine ray-finned fish, a grouper from the subfamily Epinephelinae which is part of the family Serranidae, which also includes the anthias and sea basses. It is endemic to Mexico.

== Description ==
The Gulf grouper has an elongate, robust and compressed body which is no deeper at the origin of the dorsal fin than it as the origin of the anal fin. It standard length is 3.1 to 3.4 times its depth. The preopercle is rounded, lacking a lobe, and has a finely serrated margin. The dorsal fin contains 11 spines and 16-17 soft rays while the anal fin contains 3 spines and 10–11 soft rays. The caudal fin is straight to concave. The colour of the adults is normally a uniform dark brown or grey, although they have the ability to quickly change colour and to adopt a pattern resembling that of juveniles. In the larger adults, the margin of the pectoral fin is white and the dorsal, anal and caudal fins have a narrow white edge. The juveniles are greyish brown marked with large, dark grey roughly rectangular blotches on the upper part of the body and fins. The maximum published total length for this species is 198 centimetres (78 in) and the maximum published weight is 91 kilograms (201 lb).

== Distribution ==
The Gulf grouper is found in the eastern Pacific Ocean where it is endemic to Mexican waters from San Carlos, Baja California Sur south to Mazatlán. It is found throughout the Gulf of California and around the Revillagigedos Islands. It has been recorded as a vagrant off San Diego in the 1940s and 1950s. Abundance of the Gulf Grouper has declined significantly since the mid-20th century due to commercial fishing. According to the NOAA fisheries, Bahía Magdalena has the only known population of Gulf Groupers along the coast of the Baja California peninsula.

== Habitat and biology ==
The Gulf grouper is found over rocky reefs, kelp beds and sea mounts. The adults are normally found at depths between 5 and 30 metres (16 and 98 ft) but has been recorded as deep as 45 metres (148 ft) during the summer months, and even as deep as 100 metres (330 ft) on reefs. The juveniles are found in shallow rocky reefs and artificial reefs, and also in estuaries, mangroves and bays around the islands and along the northern and central coastlines of the Gulf of California. They have been reported to prey on juvenile hammerhead sharks. The more usual prey is other fish, lobsters and slipper lobsters. It is thought that these fish attain sexual maturity at six to seven years when they are around 98 centimetres (39 in) in total length. The adults form spawning aggregations numbering more than 40 in the period from April to June. In the southern Gulf of California these aggregations cover areas larger than 1,000 square metres (11,000 ft^{2}). The aggregations have been recorded over rocky reefs or around seamounts where there are steep drop-offs and numerous of gorgonians and black coral. Aggregations have also been recorded over sandy substrates next to reefs. They spawn in pairs and a male will pair with a number of females. There are around three to five females for each male. This species is thought to be a protogynous hermaphrodite as the males are normally considerably larger than females, the sex ratios are weighted towards females, they spawn as pairs, the males are aggressively territorial and there is no evidence of sperm competition.

== Behavior and diet ==
Gulf groupers at a young age tend to prey on different types of fish and invertebrates such as crabs and shrimp. As Gulf Groupers mature, they tend to primarily prey on different fish species. Mature adults tend to hunt during dawn and dusk when the sun is not too bright on the water. According to scientists at NOAA fisheries, the Gulf grouper has a large mouth to completely swallow prey whole and the size of their mouth determines the type of fish that they consume. Mature Gulf groupers like to stay in hideouts outside of the reproduction period of the year. Reproduction period starts in April and ends in June where they gather in packs to form spawning areas that are typically in reefs.

== Lifespan and reproduction ==
The Gulf grouper typically lives for about 48 years. Female Gulf groupers become sexually mature at 6 years old when they can start reproducing offspring. The Gulf grouper is known as being protogynous hermaphroditic, which is when an organism matures as a female but later transitions into a male or vice versa. The Gulf grouper aggregate into larger groups once a year to form spawning grounds for reproduction. The groupers at maturity like to inhabit rocky reefs and different kinds of structure from 16 to 100 feet down. The juvenile gulf groupers stay closer to the shallow coast such as the mangroves.

== Taxonomy ==
The Gulf grouper was first formally described as Epinephelus jordani in 1889 by the American academic Oliver Peebles Jenkins (1850–1935) and the ichthyologist Barton Warren Evermann (1853–1932) with the type locality given as Guaymas in the state of Sonora in western Mexico. The specific name honours the American ichthyologist David Starr Jordan (1851–1931).

== Utilization and threats ==
The Gulf grouper is considered to be one of the most valuable groupers caught in the Gulf of California by commercial and recreational fisheries. It is thought that overfishing has caused the population to decline by at least 50% over the past 80 years, or so, and so the IUCN have listed it as Endangered. The Gulf grouper population suffers due to toxic chemical runoff such as a gas spill that can greatly affect the water quality for the fish. Contaminants in the water can get into the gills of the groupers and cause great risk to the health of the groupers. Over time the habitats of the Gulf grouper have been degraded because of pollution and commercial activities. Reefs play an important role in the reproduction process for the Gulf grouper, but the increase in offshore developments have restricted the Gulf grouper from getting to spawning grounds. The Gulf grouper needs a healthy reef to help to support the juvenile gulf grouper so they can grow efficiently. Recreational fishermen sometimes capture the gulf grouper by accident that can cause the fish to possibly get injured. In some cases, the injuries received from recreational fishermen to the gulf grouper can result in the grouper dying.

== Conservation efforts ==
Restrictions have been placed on fishermen being able to fish for the Gulf grouper because the species is seen as Endangered by the IUCN. Fishing for the Gulf grouper species is prohibited in the United States. Scientists that are part of the NOAA have gone to implement different ways to improve the quality of the habitats that are meant to support the Gulf grouper. The Magnuson-stevens fishery conservation and management act is supported by the NOAA to conserve fish habitats in the United States federal waters.
