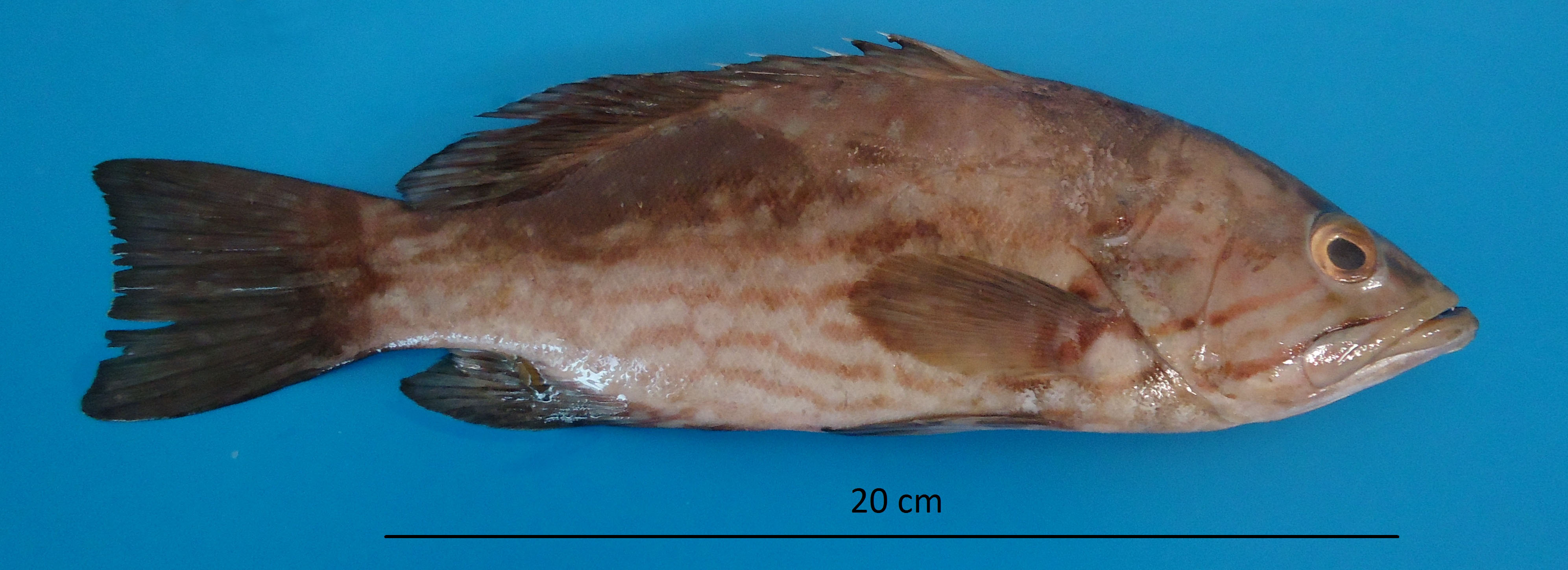

Conservation status
- Least Concern (IUCN 3.1)

Scientific classification
- Kingdom: Animalia
- Phylum: Chordata
- Class: Actinopterygii
- Order: Perciformes
- Family: Epinephelidae
- Genus: Mycteroperca
- Species: M. acutirostris

Binomial name
- Mycteroperca acutirostris (Valenciennes, 1828)

Synonyms
- Serranus acutirostris Valenciennes, 1828; Serranus undulosus Valenciennes, 1828; Epinephelus undulosus (Valenciennes, 1828); Epinephelus chalinius Cope, 1871; Epinephelus cuvieri Bleeker, 1875

= Mycteroperca acutirostris =

Species of fish

Mycteroperca acutirostris the comb grouper, western comb grouper or wavy-lined grouper, is a species of grouper from the family Serranidae from the warmer waters of the western Atlantic Ocean.

== Description ==
Mycteroperca acutirostris has a greyish brown head and body which is marked with irregular white spots. It has 3-4 dark brown lines which start behind the eye and run along the underside of the body as dark undulating stripes. The body is laterally compressed and reaches a maximum length of 80 cm. The dorsal fin has 11 spines and 15-17 soft rays, the anal fin has 3 spines and 10-12 soft rays. There is a dark brown stripe which runs from the maxillary streak to margin of the preopercle; the anal and dorsal fins are darker with white spots and streaks. The body is oblong and compressed with a depth of 2.7-3.2 times in standard length. It has a convex interorbital area; angular preopercle which has enlarged serrations at its angle which forms an indistinct lobe; the anterior and posterior nostrils are differing in size. It normally reaches around 4 kg in weight, although there are reports of specimens weighing up to 10 kg. The record rod caught fish was 5.25 kg which was caught off the Cagarras Islands in Brazil in 2004, while the spear fishing record is 10.1 kg.

== Distribution ==
Mycteroperca acutirostris occurs in the warmer waters of the western Atlantic from Bermuda, the northwestern Gulf of Mexico south to Brazil. The distribution is apparently disjunct with few reports of M. acutirostris from the Caribbean or north-eastern Brazil. There have been reports of this species under the synonym Serranus acutirostris from the Canary Islands but this is more likely to be a misidentification of Mycteroperca fusca.

== Biology ==
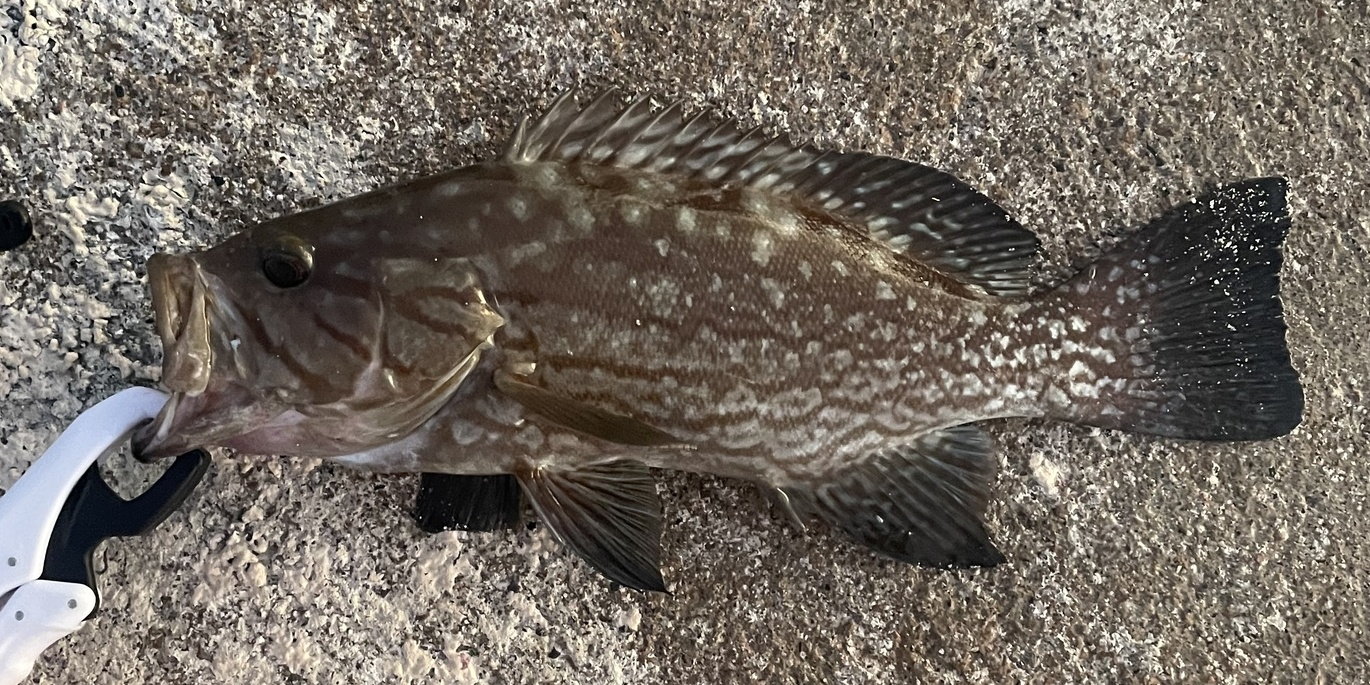
In Aruba

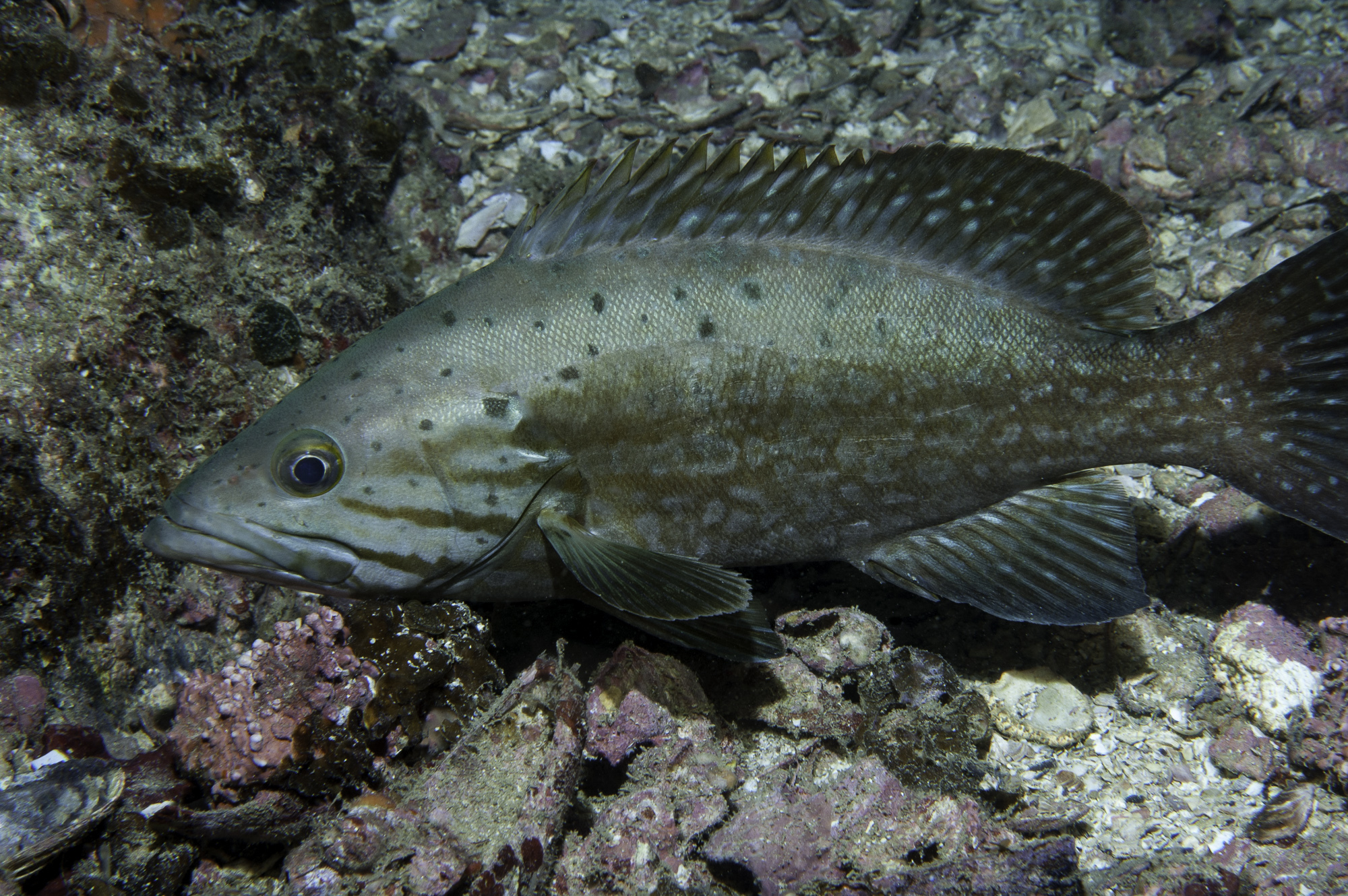
In Brazil

Mycteroperca acutirostris occur within reefs, the adults preferring areas with rocky substrates, while the juveniles live among soft corals, turtle grass beds, mangroves and in shallower waters. The juveniles have also been found in intertidal rocky shores in tide pools in South Brazil Their reproductive behaviour is little known although it is suspected that they are not sexually mature until they reach a weight of 2 kg.. In Brazilian waters they spawn during the southern spring, from September to December. They neither guard their eggs or broadcast them in the open water or over the substrate.

The schools of M. acutirostris are normally encountered capturing prey in mid water. A notable and distinctive behaviour which has been observed is that the fish pretends to be moribund by lying on its side, moving very slightly to attract prey. The fish would lay on its side moving slightly and striking at and consuming any smaller fish attracted by this behaviour. Unlike other fish species that utilize natural cover while employing death-feigning as a predatory strategy, M. acutirostris exhibits this behavior in open areas on the ocean floor. When potential prey approaches, the comb grouper rapidly lunges forward or utilizes its suction-feeding mechanism to capture the prey. A juvenile M. acutirstris was observed using this behaviour off south-eastern Brazil and it caught 5 fish in the space of 15 minutes. They prefer to feed at dawn and dusk. Adult fish are often observed preying on sardine schools in the water column and it has been reported that juvenile M. acurirostris behave as an aggressive mimic of the black-ear wrasse Halichoeres poeyi, using their resemblance to the wrasse to disguise them from potential prey. M. acurirostris have also been observed following foraging goldspot eels Myrichthys ocellatus during the day and preying on the decapods disturbed by the eels. M. acutirostris has been observed being cleaned by Elacatinus figaro off the coast of São Paulo, southeastern Brazil.

== Fisheries ==
This species is popular as a game fish where it occurs in Brazilian waters but this is not the case in the Gulf of Mexico. It is fished for as a food fish by subsistence fishermen in south eastern Brazil.
