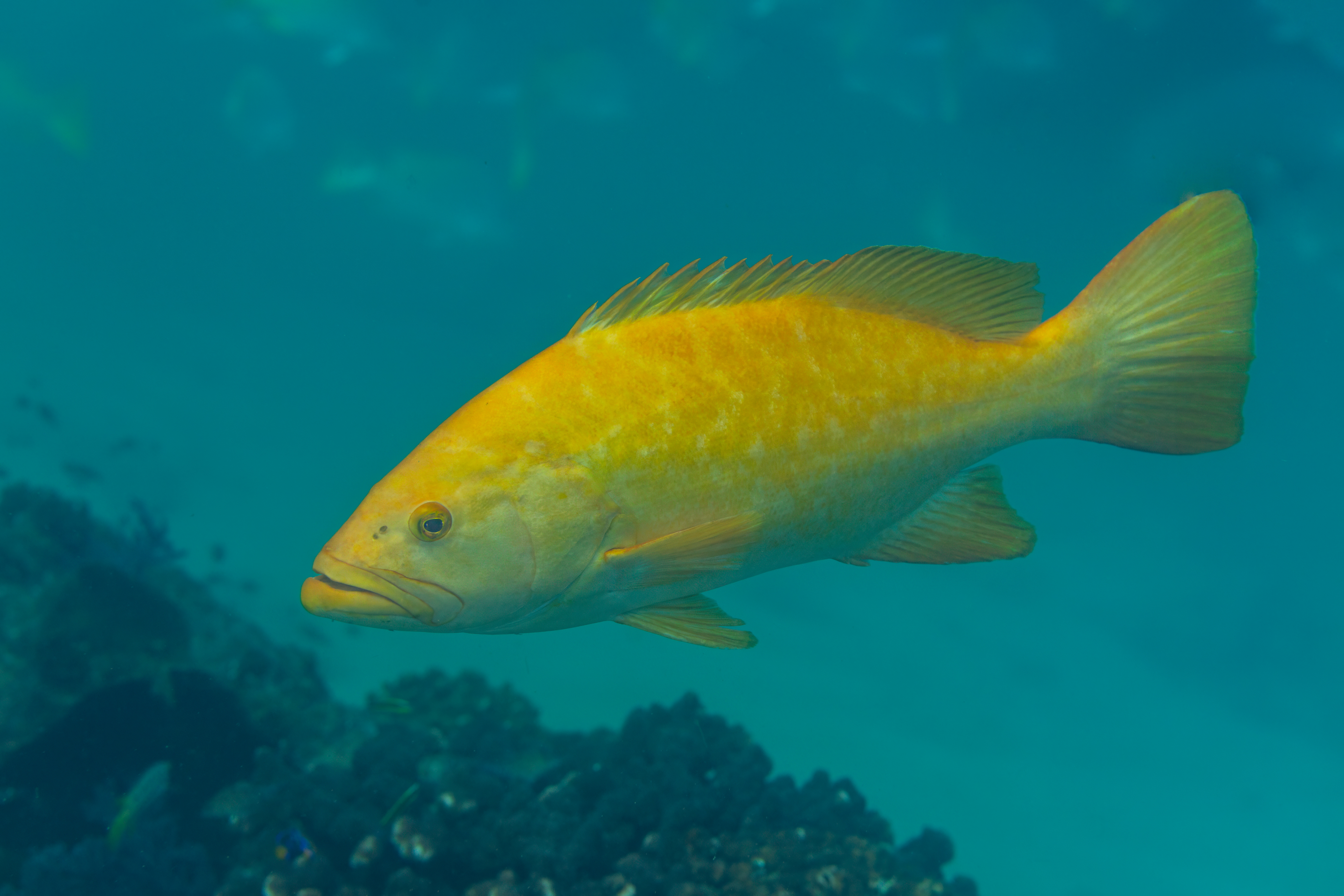
- Xanthic colour phase

Conservation status
- Least Concern (IUCN 3.1)

Scientific classification
- Kingdom: Animalia
- Phylum: Chordata
- Class: Actinopterygii
- Order: Perciformes
- Family: Epinephelidae
- Genus: Mycteroperca
- Species: M. rosacea

Binomial name
- Mycteroperca rosacea (Streets, 1877)

Synonyms
- Epinephelus rosacea Streets, 1877; Mycteroperca pardalis Gilbert, 1892

= Mycteroperca rosacea =

Species of fish

Mycteroperca rosacea, the leopard grouper or golden grouper, is a species of marine ray-finned fish, a grouper from the subfamily Epinephelinae which is part of the family Serranidae, which also includes the anthias and sea basses. It is found in the Eastern Central Pacific that occasionally makes its way into the aquarium trade.

== Taxonomy ==
Mycteroperca rosacea was first formally described as Epinephelus rosacea in 1877 by the American naval surgeon and naturalist Thomas Hale Streets (1847–1925) with the type locality given as Angel Island in the Gulf of California.

== Distribution ==
Mycteroperca rosacea occurs in the eastern Pacific Ocean where it is endemic to Mexico. It occurs from the southwestern part of the peninsula of Baja California south to Jalisco, including the Gulf of California and the Tres Marias Islands.

== Description ==
Mycteroperca rosacea has a body which is elongate, robust and compressed with its depth being the no greater at the origin of the dorsal fin as it is at the origin of the anal fin, in fact it is deepest at the origin of the anal fin. The standard length is 2.7 to 3.1 times the depth of the body. The preopercle has a small lobe its angle. The dorsal fin contains 11 spines and 16–18 soft rays while the anal fin contains 3 spines and 10–11 soft rays. The membranes between the dorsal fin spines are notched. The caudal fin has a straight rear margin. It usually has a body colour which is greenish to greyish brown marked with small reddish brown spots, as well as irregular pale spots and lines and it has white margins on the fins. There is also a xanthic colour phase in which the entire body bright yellow-orange, occasionally with few scattered black spots. This species attains a total length of 86 centimetres (34 in) and a maximum published weight of 9.6 kilograms (21 lb).

Typically coloured fish have been observed transitioning into the xanthic colour phase in captivity.

== Habitat and biology ==
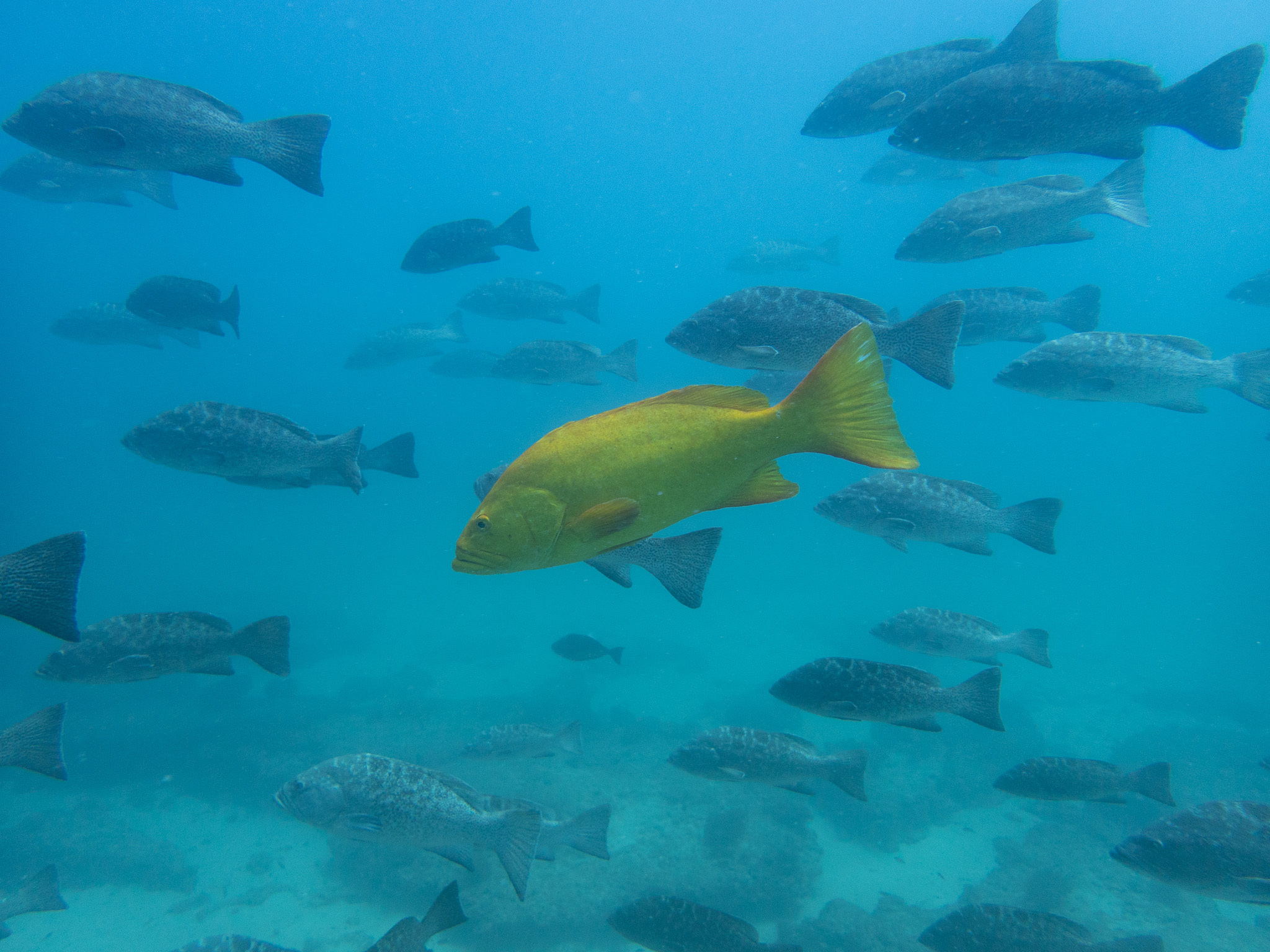
Xanthic colour phase with typically coloured fish, Baja California

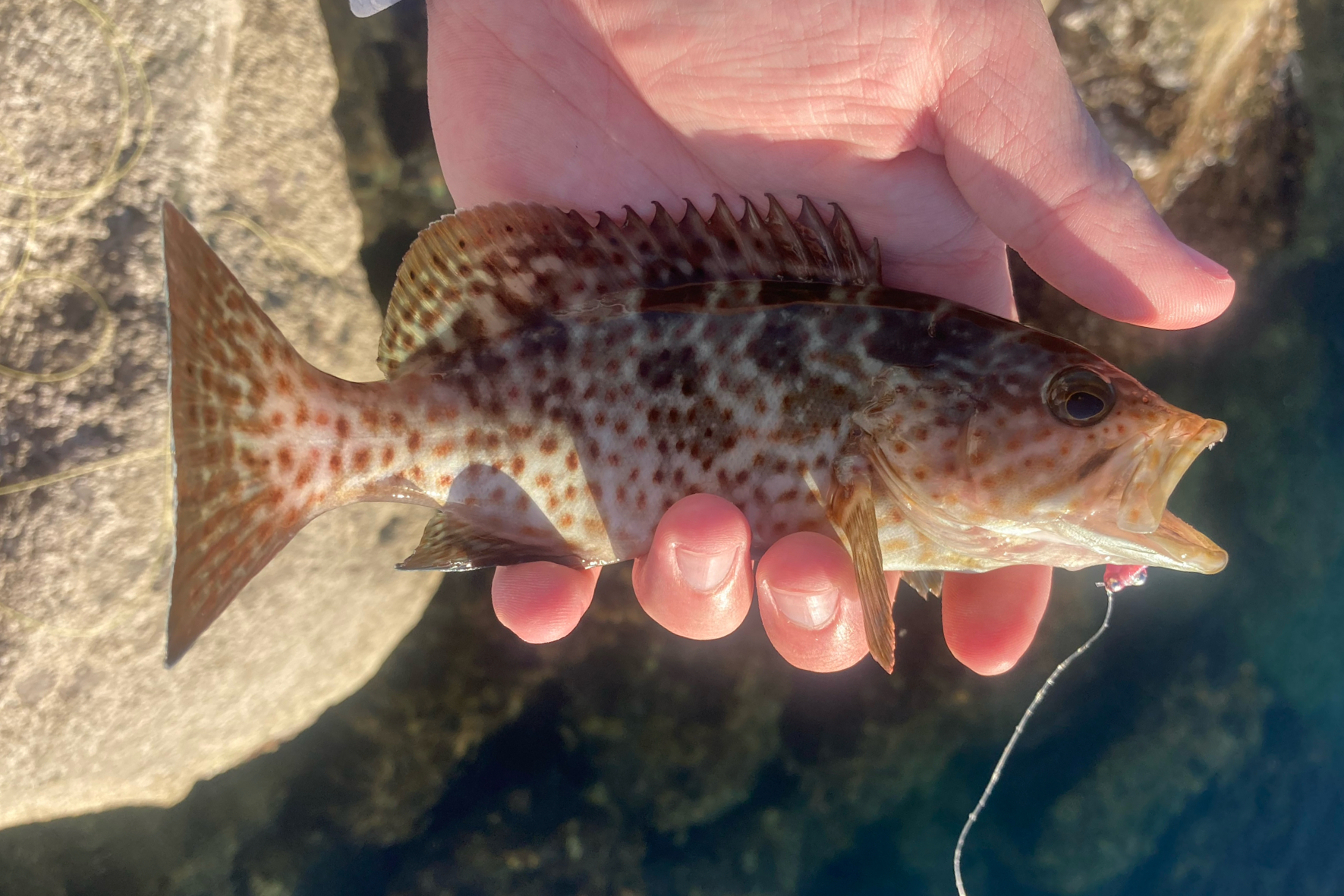
Juvenile, in Baja California

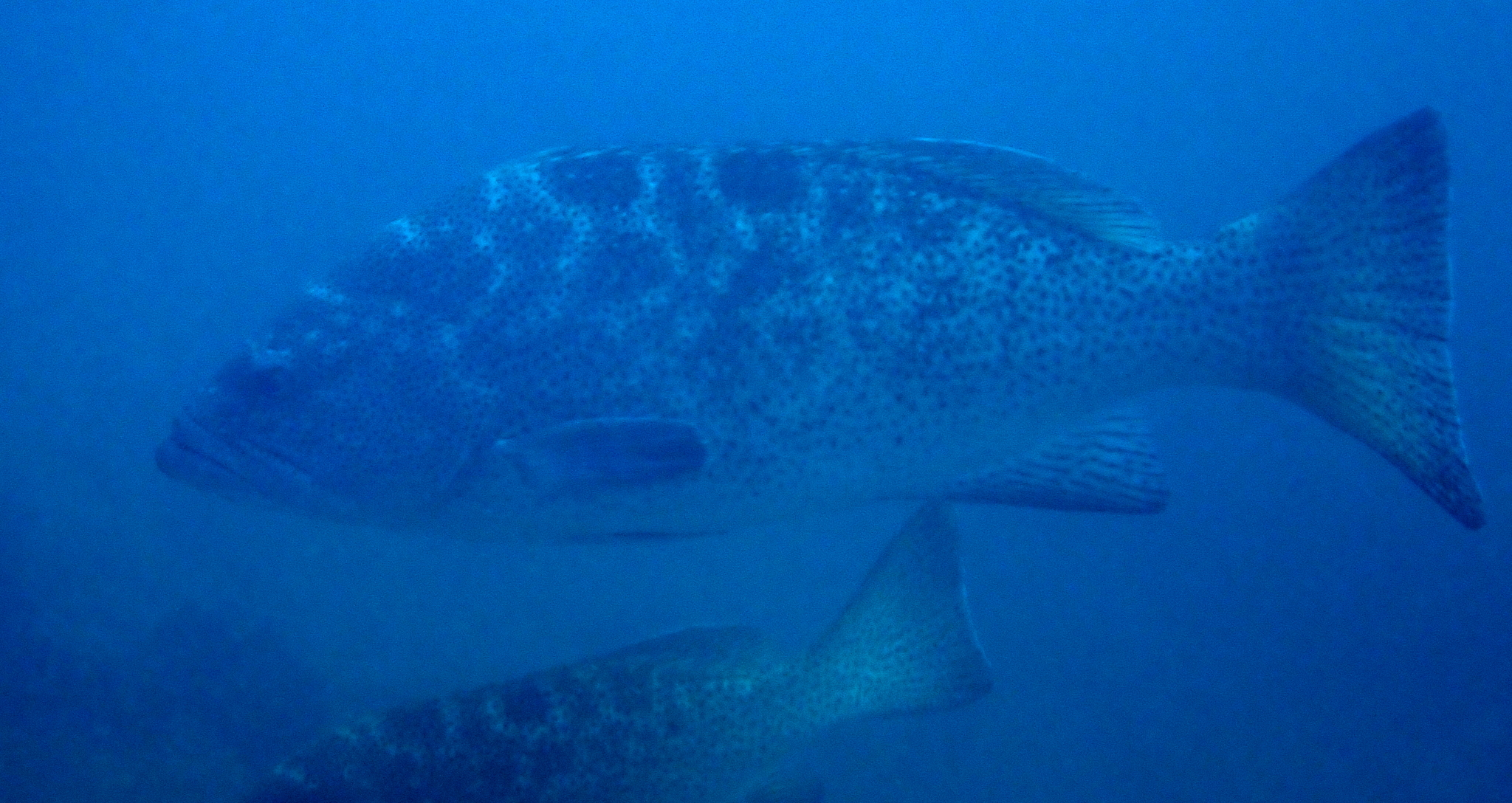
In Baja California

Mycteroperca rosacea occurs in rocky areas in shallow water with a depth range of 1 to 100 m (3 to 328 ft).

=== Diet ===
The adults are largely piscivorous and prey on schools of the Pacific flatiron herring (Harengula thrissina) and the Pacific anchoveta (Cetengraulis mysticetus) when they are in season. Otherwise, they will prey on other schooling and non-schooling fishes. They mostly feed at dawn and dusk, peaking in activity around 20 minutes after sunset. The juveniles are more diurnal, feeding on a diverse range of benthic fishes and crustaceans.

=== Reproduction ===
It is thought to be a protogynous hermaphrodite with sexually mature females changing sex to become males later in life. They pair to spawn and spawning aggregations are found from April until June. They attain a maximum age of 17 years. The larvae settle among beds of Sargassum in rocky areas and when El Niño increases the water temperature this reduces the amount of Sargassum cover and reduces this species recruitment. By contrast La Niña decreases the water temperature and recruitment of leopard groupers peaks.

== Utilisation ==
Mycteroperca rosacea is considered to be an excellent food fish and is an important target species, among other grouper species, for large and small scale fisheries in the northern Gulf of California. It is also a popular quarry for game fishing. Poachers fish illegally for Leopard groupers using spears, hookah breathing apparatus, taking a significant number of fish. They can also be fished for in the surf in the early hours of the morning.
