= Venezuelan grouper =

Conservation status
- Data Deficient (IUCN 3.1)

Scientific classification
- Kingdom: Animalia
- Phylum: Chordata
- Class: Actinopterygii
- Order: Perciformes
- Family: Epinephelidae
- Genus: Mycteroperca
- Species: M. cidi

Binomial name
- Mycteroperca cidi Cervigón, 1966

Synonyms
- Labrus guaza Linnaeus, 1758

Species of fish

The Venezuelan grouper (Mycteroperca cidi) is a species of marine ray-finned fish, a grouper from the subfamily Epinephelinae which is part of the family Serranidae, which also includes the anthias and sea basses. It is found in northern South America and the Greater Antilles.

== Description ==
The Venezuelan grouper has a body depth which is less than the length of the head. the depth of the body being around one third of the standard length, the body is elongate and robust, and is no deeper at the origin of the dorsal fin than it is at the origin of the anal fin. The dorsal fin contains 11 spines and 15-17 soft rays and the anal fin contains 3 spines and 10-12 soft rays. The preopercleis serrated and has a distinct lobe at its angle which has enlarged serrations. The caudal fin is slightly concave. The adults are pale greyish brown while the juveniles are greenish brown and are marked with irregular brown spots on the body. The soft rayed part of the dorsal fin and the anal fin has a white margin with a dark submarginal band. This species attains a maximum total length of 114 centimetres (45 in), although they are more commonly around 60 centimetres (24 in), and a maximum published weight of 15 kilograms (33 lb).

== Distribution ==
The Venezuelan grouper is found in northern South America where its range extends from Santa Marta in Colombia to the Paria Peninsula in Venezuela. It has also been recorded off Port Royal in Jamaica but it is not known whether these represent an established population.

== Habitat and biology ==
The Venezuelan grouper is found on coral and rocky reefs as well as soft coral fields. The larger adults are normally found at deeper depths, while the juveniles are recorded from shallower waters, over sandy bottoms near and on coral reefs and from sea grass beds. It depth range is 5 to 160 metres (16 to 525 ft). Very little is known about the biology of this species.

== Taxonomy ==
The Venezuelan grouper was first formally described in 1966 by the Spanish ichthyologist and marine biologist Fernando Cervigón (1930–2017) with the type locality given as Isla Cubagua in Venezuela.

== Utilisation ==
The Venezuelan grouper is an important species for fisheries along the Caribbean coast of Venezuela as it is one of the three most numerous shallow water grouper species. It is taken using with traps and hook-and-line. The flesh is marketed fresh.
