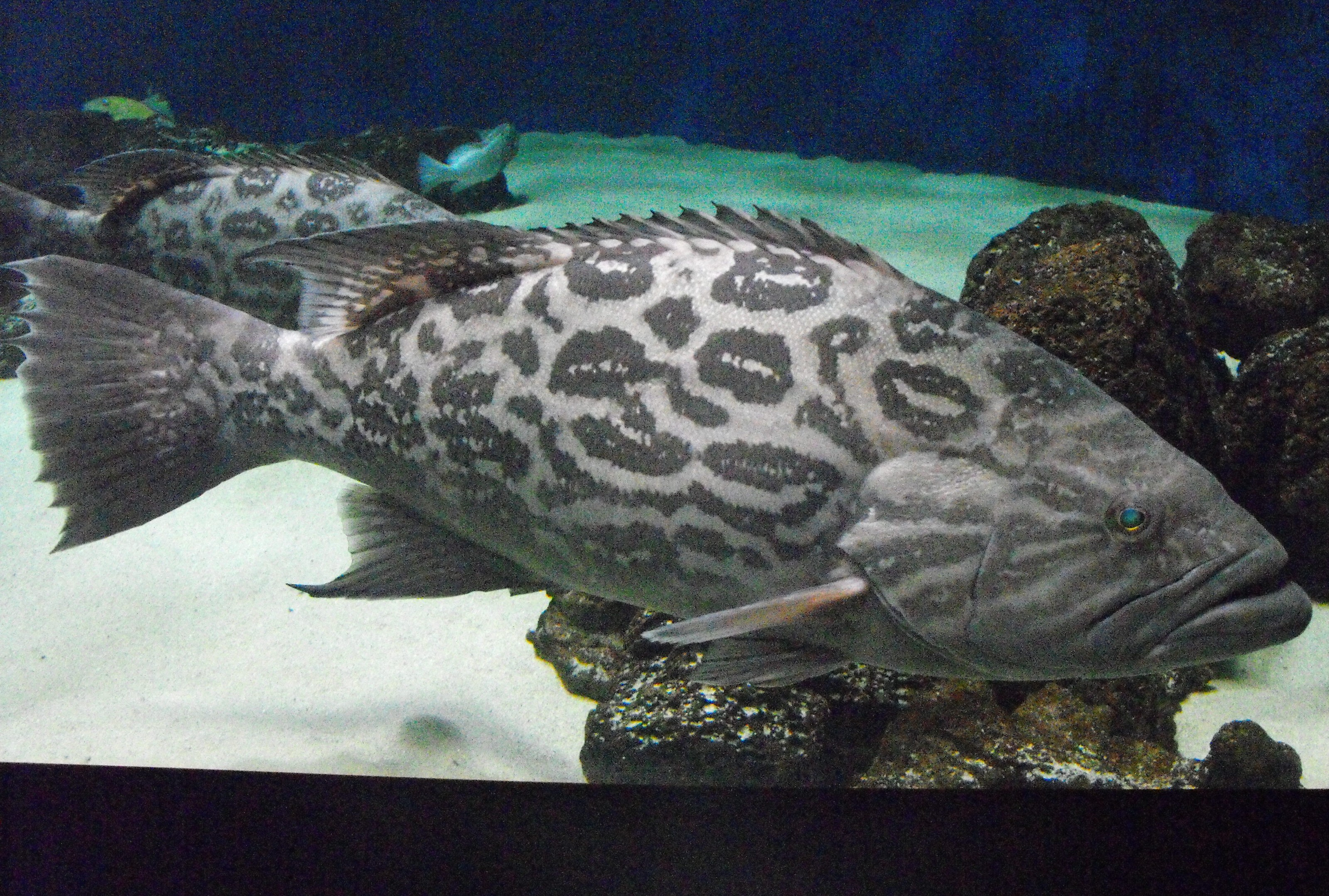

Conservation status
- Data Deficient (IUCN 3.1)

Scientific classification
- Kingdom: Animalia
- Phylum: Chordata
- Class: Actinopterygii
- Division: Teleostei
- Order: Perciformes
- Family: Epinephelidae
- Genus: Mycteroperca
- Species: M. xenarcha

Binomial name
- Mycteroperca xenarcha (Jordan, 1888)

Synonyms
- Mycteroperca boulengeri Jordan & Starks, 1895

= Mycteroperca xenarcha =

Species of fish

The broomtail grouper or mangrove grouper (Mycteroperca xenarcha) is a species of ray-finned fish from the family Serranidae which is found in the eastern Pacific along the western coast of the Americas from California to Peru.

== Distribution ==
Mycteroperca xenarcha occurs in the eastern Central Pacific from San Francisco Bay, California, in the north south to Peru and also around the Galapagos Islands.

There is a single record from San Francisco Bay suggesting that it is a vagrant there. Similarly although the holotype is labelled as coming from the Galapagos Islands it is the sole record from that archipelago and the specimen is most likely mislabelled and was probably taken in Peru.

== Description ==
In Panama

Mycteroperca xenarcha has an elongated, robust and compressed body which has its depth at the origin of the dorsal fin is not any greater than the depth at the origin of the anal fin. The snout is much longer than the eye with the lower jaw projecting beyond the upper and with canine-like teeth at front of the jaws. The preopercle corner angle strongly serrated and there are 29-33 gill rakers. The dorsal fin has 11 spines and 16-17 soft rays with spines 2-7 being the same length; the anal fin has 2 spines and 10-11 rays, the pectoral fin has 16-18 rays, although most specimens have 17. The caudal fin has a jagged rear edge caused by the projecting of the rays beyond the membrane. It is pale brown in colour with elongated dark brown blotches, which frequently have pale brown middles. It grows to about 150 cm (59 in) in length and to 45.4 kg (100 lb) in weight. The record catch is 49.24 kg (108 lb 9 oz)

== Habitat ==
Small individual, in Mexico

Mycteroperca xenarcha is found from mangrove areas to over the hard substrates of the continental shelf and the slope. It is said to prefer mangrove filled estuaries. Both adults and juveniles can be found in shallow water although adults can occur to depths of 60 m (200 ft).

== Threats ==
Mycteroperca xenarchais not threatened by fisheries, although fishermen in Mexico say that it used to be more numerous. The main threat is habitat loss through the destruction of mangroves.
