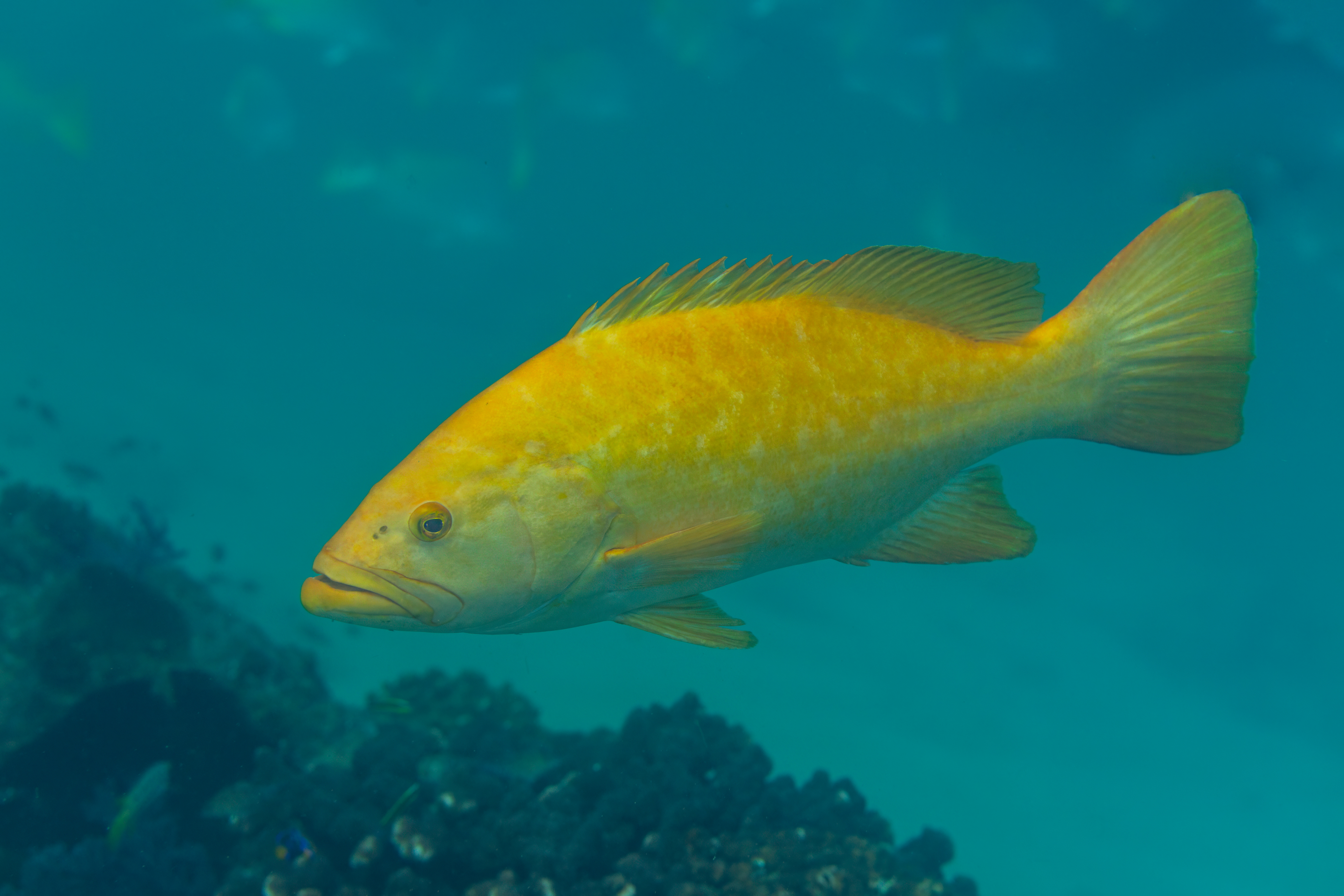
- Mycteroperca rosacea

Scientific classification
- Kingdom: Animalia
- Phylum: Chordata
- Class: Actinopterygii
- Division: Teleostei
- Order: Perciformes
- Family: Epinephelidae
- Genus: Mycteroperca; Gill, 1863

Type species
- Serranus olfax Jenyns, 1840

Synonyms
- Trisotropis Gill, 1866; Parepinephelus Bleeker, 1876; Archoperca Jordan and Evermann, 1896; Xystroperca Jordan and Evermann, 1896

= Mycteroperca =

Genus of fishes

Mycteroperca is a genus of marine ray-finned fish, groupers from the subfamily Epinephelinae, part of the family Serranidae, which also includes the anthias and sea basses. They are predatory fish, largely associated with reefs and are found in tropical and subtropical seas in the Atlantic Ocean and the eastern Pacific Ocean. They are important target species for fisheries.

== Characteristics ==
The fishes in the genus Mycteroperca have oblong bodies in which the depth of the body is less than the length of the head, which is a quarter to just under a third of the standard length. The length of the snout is noticeably longer than the diameter of the eye. The dorsal profile of the head is convex and the area between the eyes is also convex, having a width greater than the diameter of the eyes (in fish with a standard length greater than 20 centimetres (7.9 in)). The edges of the preopercle are serrated and the serrations at the bones angle may, or may not, be enlarged. The upper edge of gill cover is convex. The lower edge of upper jaw is straight near the joint and there is no knob, distinct step or hook present. The supramaxilla well developed. The lower jaw projects beyond the upper jaw and there are obvious canines in the front of both jaws while there are also teeth on roof of the mouth. In these fishes the dorsal fin contains 11 spines and 15 to 18 soft rays while the anal fin contains 3 spines and 10 to 13 soft rays, the central rays being longer than the others. The caudal fin may be truncate, emarginate or concave in shape and has 8 branched fin rays and 9 to 12 rays in its lower part which are placed further towards the margin. The scales along the flanks around the lateral line are ctenoid.

== Habitat and biology ==
Mycteroperca are found in coral reefs and over rocky bottoms at depths between 12 and 200 metres (39 and 656 ft) as adults while juveniles are found in shallower rock habitats, in sea grass beds and in estuarine environments. The adults are piscivorous, apart from the species in the rubra species complex which feed on zooplankton. The juveniles prey largely on crustaceans, although they will eat other invertebrates.

== Distribution ==
Mycteroperca groupers are mainly found in the eastern Pacific and western Atlantic Ocean with two species in the eastern Atlantic Ocean and the Mediterranean Sea.

== Utilisation ==
The groupers in the genus Mycteroperca are valuable target species for both recreational and commercial fisheries.

== Taxonomy ==
Mycteroperca was named as a genus by the American ichthyologist Theodore Nicholas Gill (1837–1914) with the type species being Serranus olfax. This genus appears to be more closely related to the genus Epinephelus than they are to the other relatively speciose genus in the tribe Epinephelini, Cephalopholis.

=== Extant species ===
It contains the following species:

Image	Scientific name	Common name	Distribution
	Mycteroperca acutirostris (Valenciennes, 1828)	Comb grouper, western comb grouper, wavy-lined grouper	western Atlantic Ocean.
	Mycteroperca bonaci (Poey, 1860)	Black grouper, black rockfish, marbled rockfish	western Atlantic where its range extends from Cape Canaveral in Florida and Bermuda south to the Bahamas, into the Gulf of Mexico as far north as Alabama and from southern Texas along the coast of Mexico and Cuba
	Mycteroperca cidi Cervigón, 1966	Venezuelan grouper	South America where its range extends from Santa Marta in Colombia to the Paria Peninsula in Venezuela
	Mycteroperca fusca Lowe, 1838	Island grouper, comb grouper	the Canary Islands, Azores, Madeira and Cape Verde
	Mycteroperca interstitialis (Poey, 1860)	Yellowmouth grouper	Caribbean and tropical Atlantic
	Mycteroperca jordani (Jenkins & Evermann, 1889)	Gulf grouper	Mexican waters from San Carlos, Baja California Sur south to Mazatlán. It is found throughout the Gulf of California and around the Revillagigedos Islands.
	Mycteroperca microlepis (Goode & Bean, 1879)	Gag grouper, gag, velvet rockfish, charcoal belly	Atlantic Ocean Bermuda and along the eastern coast of the United States from North Carolina south to Yucatan Peninsula of Mexico
	Mycteroperca olfax (Jenyns, 1840)	Sailfin grouper, bacalao grouper, colorado grouper, yellow grouper	Pacific Ocean where it occurs in the waters off the Galapagos Islands of Ecuador, Cocos Island in Costa Rica and Malpelo Island of Colombia.
	Mycteroperca phenax Jordan & Swain, 1884	Scamp	western Atlantic Ocean from North Carolina south along the southern Atlantic coast of the United States into the Gulf of Mexico
	Mycteroperca prionura Rosenblatt & Zahuranec, 1967	Sawtail grouper	western coasts of Mexico.
	Mycteroperca rosacea (Streets, 1877)	Leopard grouper	Eastern Central Pacific
	Mycteroperca rubra (Bloch, 1793)	Mottled grouper	eastern Atlantic Ocean and the Mediterranean Sea.
	Mycteroperca tigris (Valenciennes, 1833)	Tiger grouper	western Atlantic Ocean from southeastern Florida, Bermuda and the Bahamas, as well as the Flower Garden Banks in the north, southwards through the Caribbean Sea to the Maroni River in French Guiana.
	Mycteroperca venenosa (Linnaeus, 1758)	Yellowfin grouper	western Atlantic Ocean
	Mycteroperca xenarcha Jordan, 1888	Broomtail grouper, mangrove grouper	eastern Pacific along the western coast of the Americas from California to Peru.
