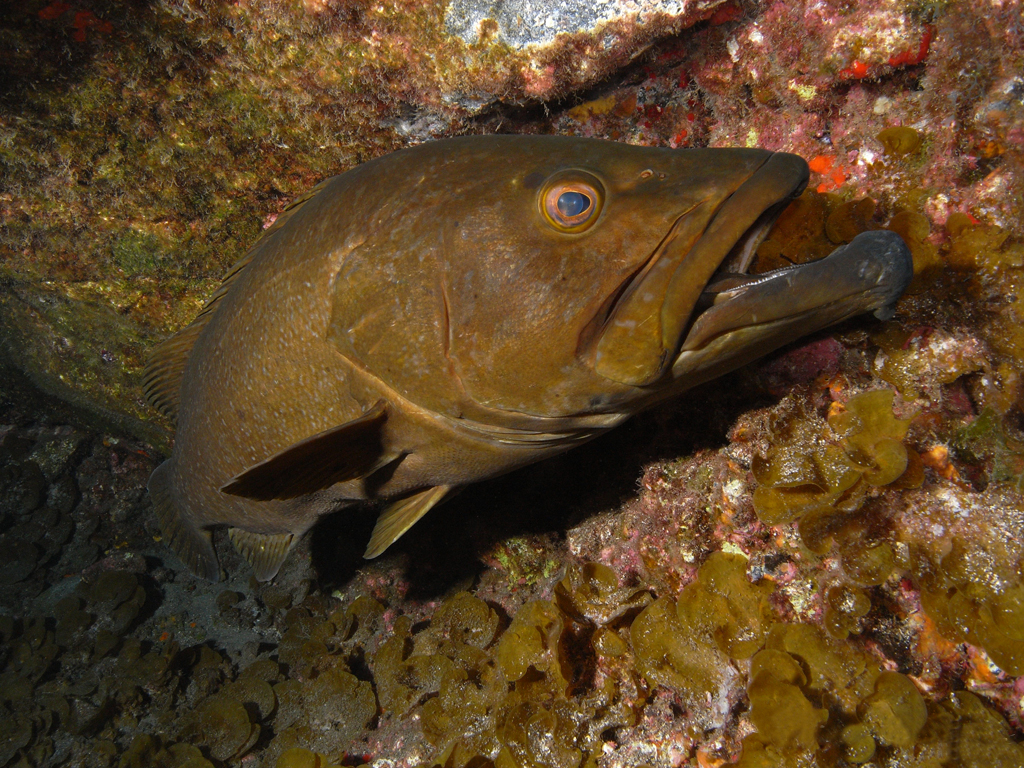

Conservation status
- Vulnerable (IUCN 3.1)

Scientific classification
- Kingdom: Animalia
- Phylum: Chordata
- Class: Actinopterygii
- Order: Perciformes
- Family: Epinephelidae
- Genus: Mycteroperca
- Species: M. fusca

Binomial name
- Mycteroperca fusca (Lowe, 1838)

Synonyms
- Serranus fuscus Lowe, 1838; Serranus emarginatus Valenciennes, 1843; Serranus simonyi Steindachner, 1891

= Mycteroperca fusca =

Species of fish

Mycteroperca fusca, the Island grouper or comb grouper, is a species of grouper from the family Serranidae which is endemic to the Macaronesian Islands in the eastern Atlantic. It is classified as Vulnerable in The IUCN Red List of Endangered Species.

== Description ==
Mycteroperca fusca is a large species which has a brownish or dark grey body colour when adult which is marked with irregular pale blotches and spots as well as a prominent maxillary streak. When stressed M. fusca is capable of reversing its body colour and pattern. Juveniles are mottled greenish brown, with prominent white spots on the head and the body, with the dorsal, anal and caudal fins have white streaks andtranslucent golden pectoral fins. The body is oblong and compressed with a depth that is 3.0-3.3 times the standard length. There is a convex interorbital area and it possesses enlarged serrations on the preopercle at its angle, forming a rounded lobe below a shallow indentation on the vertical limb. There are a few small serrations on the subopercle and interopercle. In the juveniles the anterior and posterior nostrils are slightly unequal but in adults with the posterior nostrils are three times larger than the anterior nostrils. The lower jaws protrude well beyond the upper jaws.

The meristic formula is D, XI,14-16; A III, 10 - 12. The maximum length is 80 cm.

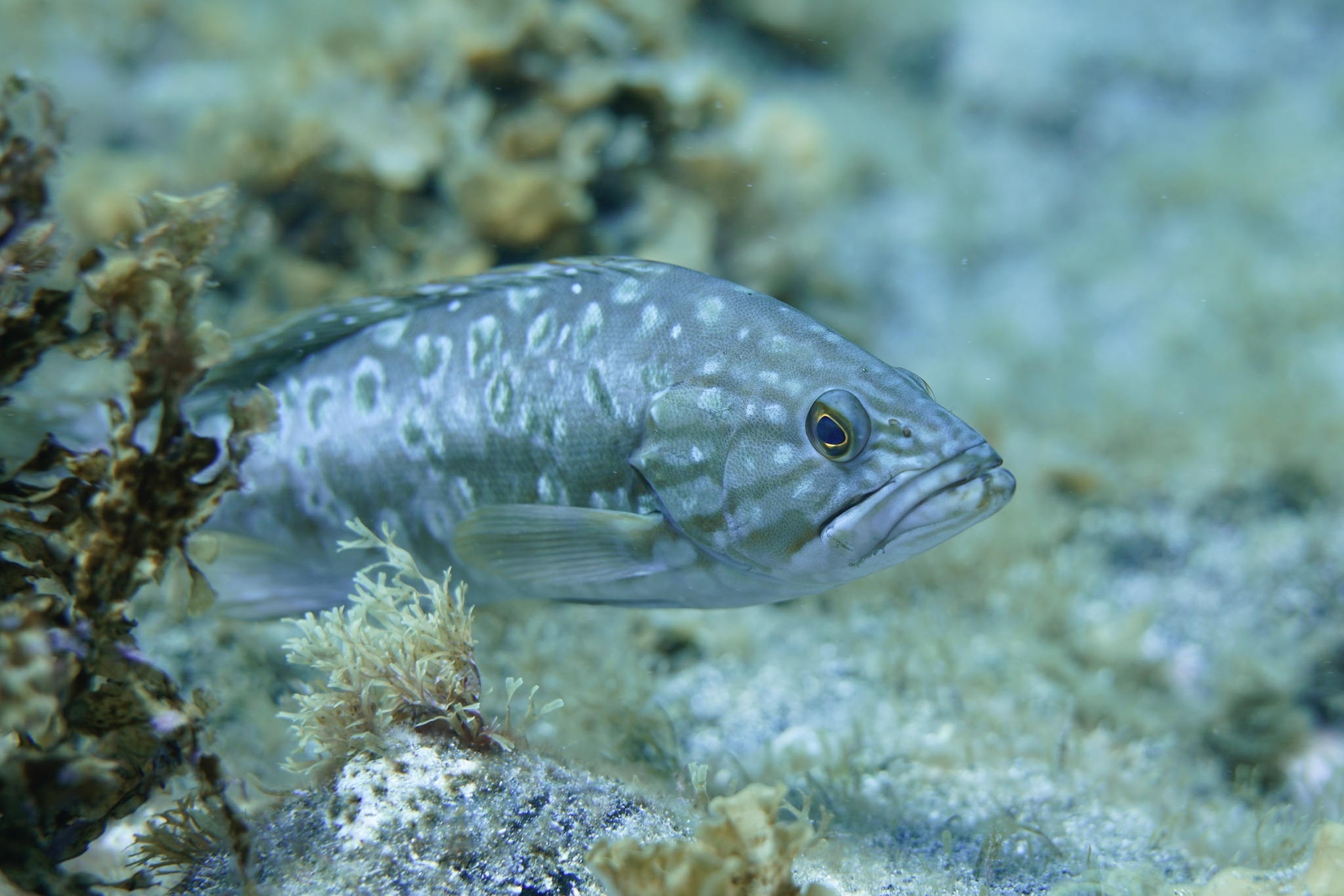
Island Grouper, Tenerife Island

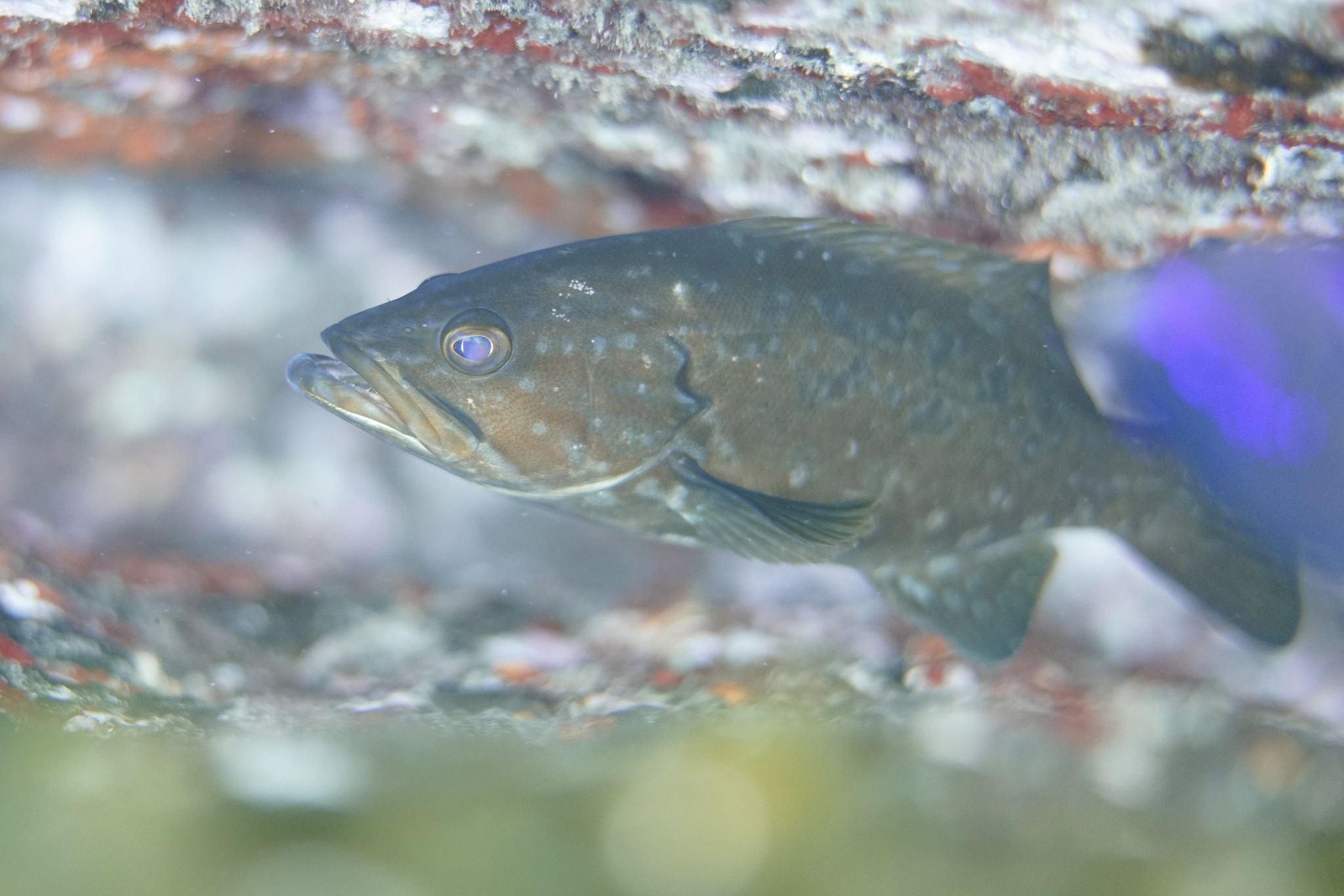
Island Grouper, Tenerife island

== Distribution ==
Mycteroperca fusca is an insular species from the Canary Islands, Azores, Madeira and Cape Verde. In 2010, two individuals were reported in the Mediterranean Sea off Israel.

== Biology ==
Mycteroperca fusca is a demersal species which is found near the seabed in rocky regions at depths from 1 to 200 m. The juveniles are frequently found in tidal pools. It prefers areas with crevices, caves and seaweed to provide cover. It is a protogynous hermaphrodite, i.e. the females change to males, and aggregations of spawning fish have been reported. Spawning begins in February in the Canary Islands and continues through to July. They can live for 30–40 years. They are predatory feeding on crustaceans, cephalopods and fish, its main prey are Chromis limbata, Thalassoma pavo, Boops boops and Similiparma lurida and this species is an active hunter, exploring its territory in search of prey.

== Conservation ==
Mycteroperca fusca has a limited range where it is rare especially in areas which are subjected to heavy fishing pressure. A number of studies have shown a negative correlation between the abundance of M. fusca and the amount of fishing pressure, suggesting that overexploitation has significantly reduced the population. It may also be threatened by competition and parasites from the invasive non-native European seabass (Dicentrarchus labrax), which has escaped from aquaculture in the Canaries, and African hind Cephalopholis taeniops, which has thought to have arrived in the Canaries in ships' ballast water from West Africa.

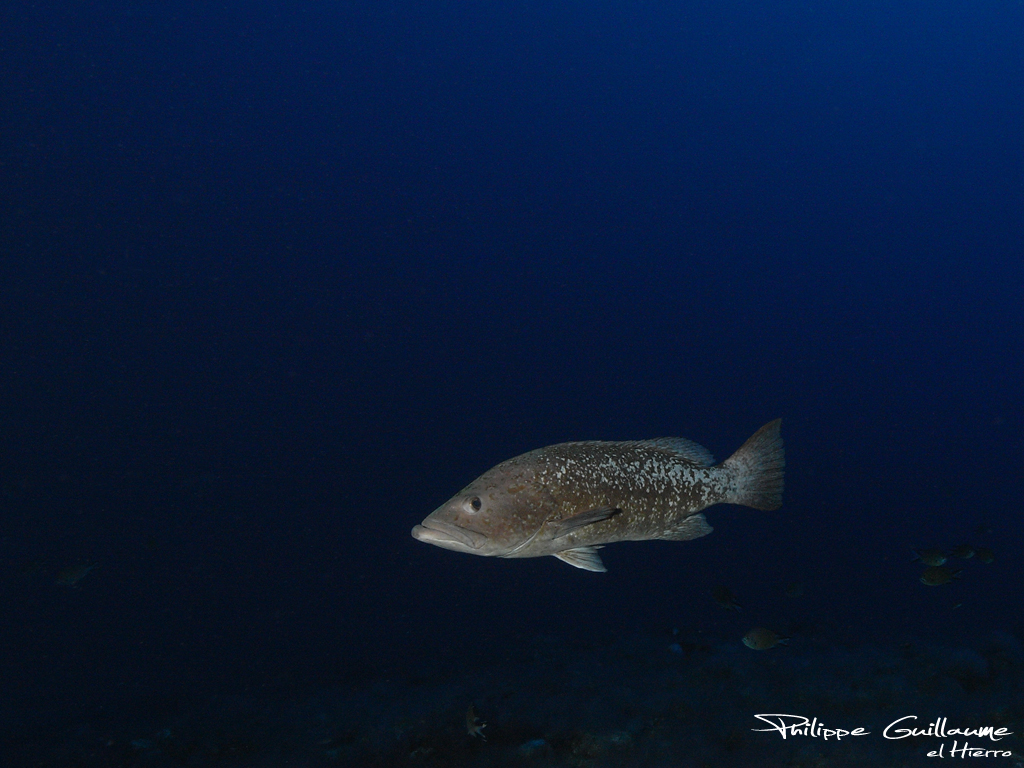
Mycteroperca fusca
