= Thomas Hale Streets =

American naturalist and surgeon

Thomas Hale Streets (November 20, 1847 – March 3, 1925) was an American naturalist. He served as a surgeon in the U.S. Navy from 1872 and retired in 1909 as the Director of the Navy Hospital in Washington, D.C. He was a veteran of the Spanish–American War. He died in 1925 of heart disease. His works include Contributions to the Natural History of the Hawaiian and Fanning Islands and Lower California (1877).
