= New South Wales Albatross Study Group =

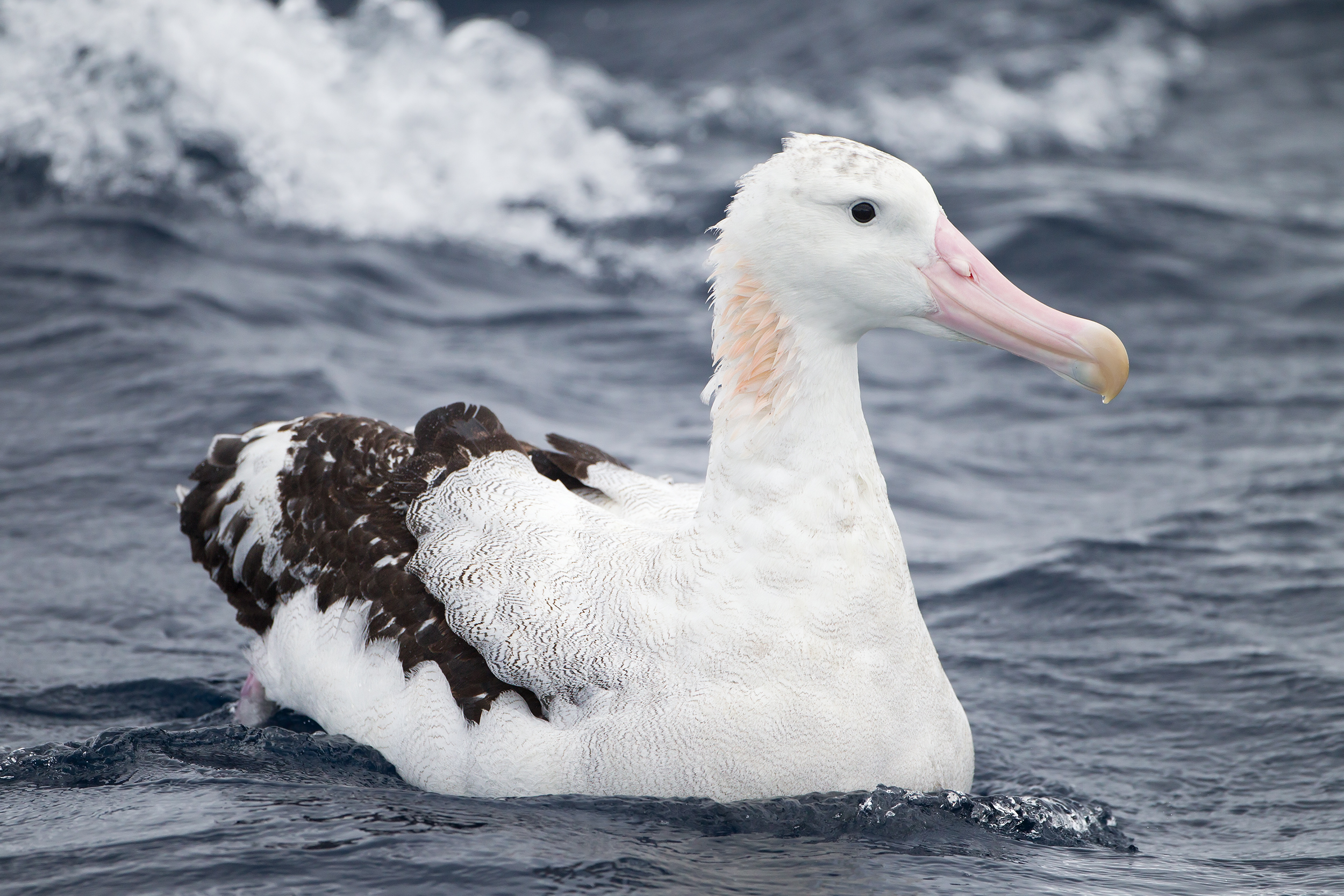
Wandering albatross

The New South Wales Albatross Study Group (NSWASG) was an amateur ornithological fieldwork group that banded albatrosses and other seabirds off the coast of eastern New South Wales, Australia. Primarily targeting winter feeding aggregations of wandering albatrosses near Sydney, it developed its own catching methods and initiated what has become the longest-running continuous albatross research study in the world.

== History ==
=== Origins ===
The origins of the NSWASG lie in the pioneer albatross banding activities started by Doug Gibson and Allan Sefton in 1956 at Bellambi in the Illawarra region, and by Bill Lane and Harry Battam in 1958 at Malabar, some 56 km further north in south-eastern Sydney. This followed the realisation that large concentrations of great albatrosses appeared in winter off the New South Wales coast not far from Sydney, and raised the possibility among local amateur ornithologists of catching useful numbers at sea for banding. Black-browed albatrosses also occurred in similar numbers, but wandering albatrosses were considered easier to catch because of their "more phlegmatic disposition", so the banding programs focussed on the latter. At the time there were thought to be only two great albatross species – the wandering and royal albatrosses, with the royal (now split into northern royal and southern royal albatrosses) not known to occur along the coast of eastern Australia. The group, incorporating both banding programs, was formed in 1958 to operate as part of the Australian Bird Banding Scheme. Its objective was "to accumulate… as much information as possible concerning Diomedea exulans when at sea".

=== Sites ===
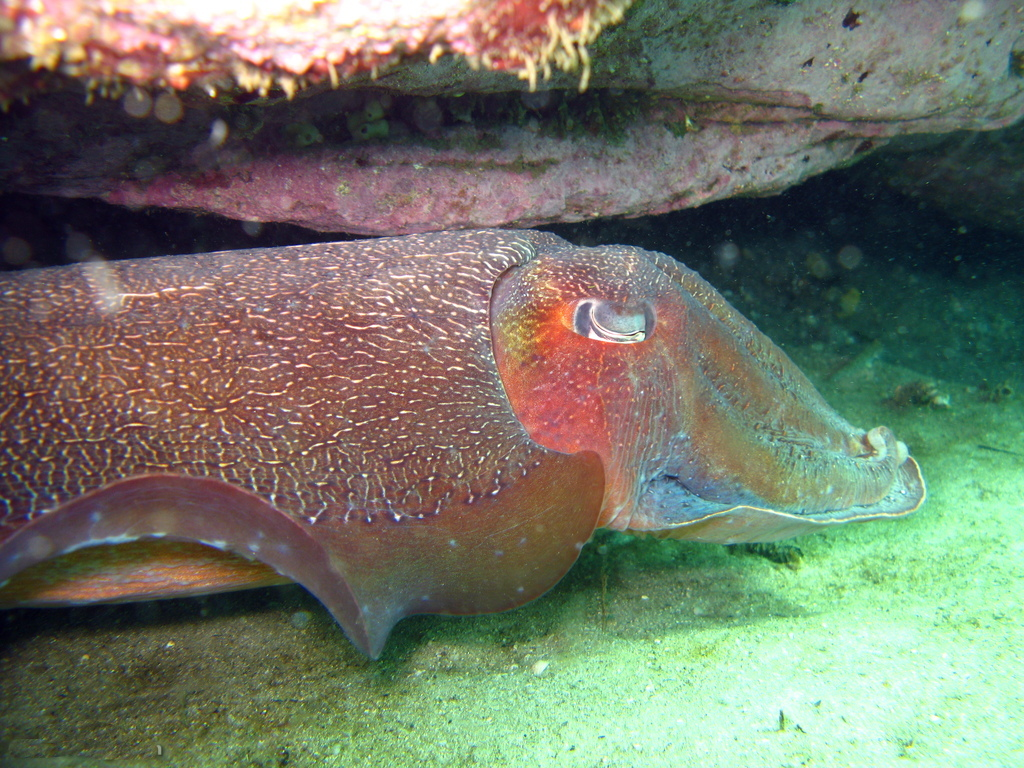
Australian giant cuttlefish

The Bellambi site attracted large numbers of albatrosses because of the seasonal abundance of breeding aggregations of a favoured prey species, the Australian giant cuttlefish, with the albatrosses feasting both on live cuttlefish and the debris from predation by dolphins. At Malabar the attraction was the presence of a major submarine sewage outfall which, during the 1950s, discharged large quantities of meaty and fatty wastes from abattoirs and tanneries and acted as a feeding station for albatrosses and other seabirds. According to local ornithologist Keith Hindwood, "Towards the end of April or early in May there is a large influx [of wandering albatrosses], and for the next six months it is not unusual to record from 100 to upwards of 400 birds close to the sewer outlets or resting on the water near the drift-line extending for half a mile or more from the cliffs".

=== Methods ===
Catching albatrosses was only possible because, in light winds and while the birds were burdened with food, it was very difficult for them to take off from the water. Experiments began with the use of a metal triangle on a float; it was baited with cuttlefish meat to catch the albatross attempting to grasp the bait by the nail, or hooked tip of its upper mandible, and so draw it into a boat where it could be measured and banded. However, this method was slow and uncertain and it was replaced by the use of a hand-held hoop net, 1.35 m in diameter, which could be thrown over the bird as the boat approached it downwind while it struggled to become airborne.

=== Results ===
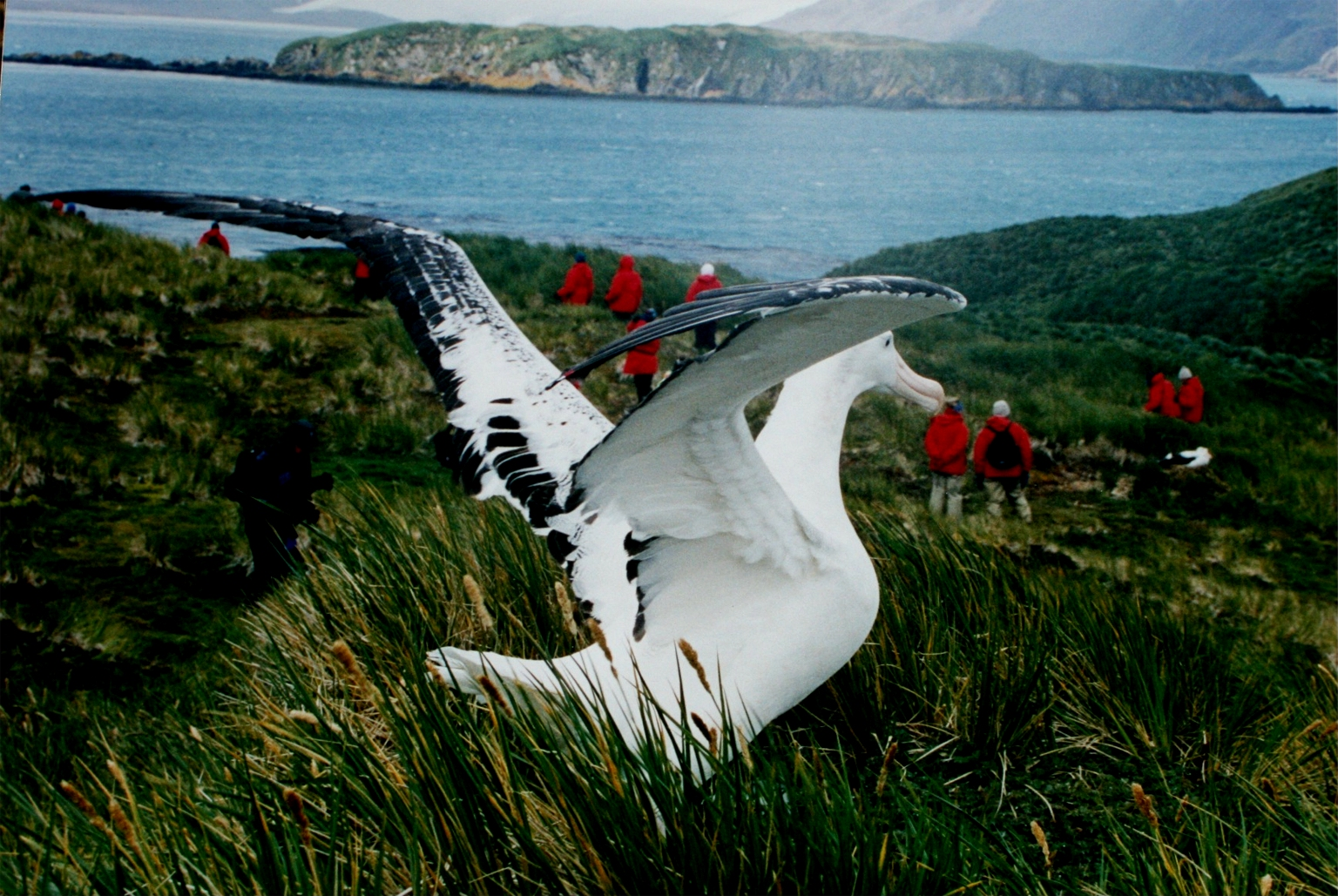
Wandering albatross at South Georgia

During the first 13 months of operations the group caught and banded 197 "wandering" and two black-browed albatrosses, 63% of which were caught at Bellambi. The group's first international recovery was of an adult male Wanderer, banded at Bellambi on 23 August 1958, which was present on Bird Island, South Georgia, in the South Atlantic Ocean, from 29 December 1958 to 6 March 1959. In 1959 the group caught and banded 551 Wanderers, 21 of which were retraps from the previous year, as well as a bird banded in South Georgia. By the end of the 1962 winter banding season, a total of 1238 Wanderers had been banded. Of these the proportion of retraps from previous years increased annually and it became clear that many birds returned each year. There were also many recoveries of banded birds in South Georgia.

The group continued to operate for over thirty years despite the deaths of several of its founders and the end of Malabar as a suitable banding site with improvements in sewage treatment. As well as South Georgia, recoveries of albatrosses banded in New South Wales have been made in the Crozet Archipelago, the Prince Edward Islands, the Antipodes and Auckland Islands, with the body of research, which is ongoing, described as the longest continuous study of albatrosses anywhere in the world. One product of the research was the Gibson Plumage Index, developed to categorise the variation in plumage colouring and, with the measurements, indicating differences between island populations.

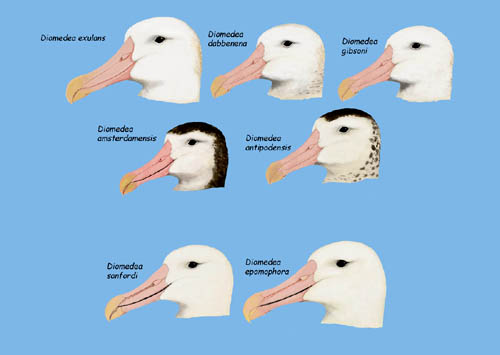
Heads of "great albatrosses"

The "Wanderer" group of albatrosses has been split into several taxa including, as well as the wandering albatross, the Antipodean, Gibson's, Tristan and Amsterdam albatrosses, not all of which are recognised by all authorities. Although the taxonomy is still in flux, the work of the group was instrumental in first indicating the genetic isolation of several island breeding populations. The group was eventually subsumed into, and its work continued by, the Southern Oceans Seabird Study Association (SOSSA), established in 1994 by members of the NSWASG as an umbrella organisation for many groups involved in studies of the biodiversity of the Southern Ocean.
