= Mitchell Durno Murray =

Mitchell Durno Murray (1925 – 25 April 2009) was an Australian veterinary scientist, and an ornithologist with a particular interest in seabirds. He was born and educated in England before moving to New Zealand and then Australia. He was the first regional organiser for New South Wales of the Australian Bird Banding Scheme. He was instrumental in establishing the New South Wales Albatross Study Group, now the Southern Oceans Seabird Study Association (SOSSA). He was President of the Australian Bird Study Association 1973–1974, Editor of its journal Corella 1990–1994, and largely responsible for its 'Seabird Islands' series.

== Awards ==
In 1996 he was awarded the RAOU's John Hobbs Medal for outstanding contributions to Australian ornithology as an amateur. In 2009 he was awarded an Honorary DSc by the University of Sydney.

== See also ==
- List of ornithologists

== Bibliography ==
From the 1990s Murray has been part of a research team studying the movements of albatrosses, especially wandering albatrosses, Diomedea exulans. Some papers resulting from this collaborative research are:

- Nicholls, David; Murray, Durno; Battam, Harry; Robertson, Graham; Moors, Philip; Butcher, Eric; & Hildebrandt, Michael. (1995). Satellite tracking of the Wandering Albatross, Diomedea exulans, around Australia and in the Indian Ocean. EMU 95: 223–230.
- Nicholls, D.G.; Murray, M.D.; Butcher, E.; & Moors, P. (1997). Weather systems determine the non-breeding distribution of Wandering Albatrosses over southern oceans. EMU 97: 240–244.
- Nicholls, D.G.; Murray, M.D.; Butcher, E.C.; & Moors, P.J. (2000). Time spent in Exclusive Economic Zones of southern oceans by non-breeding Wandering Albatrosses (Diomedea spp.): implications for national responsibilities for conservation. EMU 100: 318–323.
- Murray, M.D.; Nicholls, D.G.; Butcher, E.C.; & Moors, P. (2002). How Wandering Albatrosses use weather systems to fly long distances. 1. An analytical method and its application to flights in the Tasman Sea. EMU 102: 377–385.
- Murray, M. D.; Nicholls, D. G.; Butcher, E.; & Moors, P.J. (2003). How Wandering Albatrosses use weather systems to fly long distances. 2. The use of eastward-moving cold fronts from Antarctic lows to travel westwards across the Indian Ocean. EMU 103: 59–65.
- Murray, M.D.; Nicholls, D.G.; Butcher, E.C.; Moors, P.; Walker, K.; & Elliott, G. (2003). How Wandering Albatrosses use weather systems to fly long distances. 3. The contributions of Antarctic lows to eastward, southward and northward flight. EMU 103: 111–120.
