= Southern Oceans Seabird Study Association =

Australian research organization

The Southern Oceans Seabird Study Association (SOSSA) is an Australian natural history research and conservation organisation. It is based in Wollongong, New South Wales. It was formally established in 1994 by members of the New South Wales Albatross Study Group Lindsay Smith and Harry Battam to be an umbrella organisation for groups involved with biological research on, and concerned about the environment of, the Southern Ocean. However, its origins go back to the start of long-term banding studies of albatrosses by Doug Gibson and Allan Sefton on the coast of New South Wales in the mid-1950s, with SOSSA continuing one of the longest-running albatross research programs in the world.

SOSSA is also involved in research and conservation of little penguins in New South Wales, making its data sheets available to the NSW National Parks and Wildlife Service and being represented on their Little Penguin Recovery Team.

SOSSA operates monthly public pelagic trips from Wollongong to see seabirds and marine mammals. Projects supported by SOSSA include studies of Diomedea and Thalassarche albatrosses, sooty oystercatchers, cuttlefish, and the Five Islands Nature Reserve off Port Kembla.
