= Gibson Plumage Index =

System for describing the plumage of great albatrosses

The Gibson Plumage Index (GPI), sometimes known as the Gibson Code, is a system for describing the plumage of great albatrosses. It is named after, and originally devised in the late 1950s by, John Douglas Gibson and other members of the New South Wales Albatross Study Group. Gibson was an Australian amateur ornithologist who carried out fieldwork on albatrosses along the coast of New South Wales for thirty years. The index assigns separate numerical values (from 1 to 6 with increasing proportion of white) to the degrees of colouration on four parts of the body - the back, head, inner wing and tail - of albatrosses to indicate variations in age and between different breeding populations. For instance, a bird with a completely brown back would receive a score of 1 for the back, while a bird with an all-white back would be scored as a 6. The index was later expanded by Pierre Jouventin and colleagues to cover the more complex patterning of the Amsterdam albatross, adding belly and tibial feather colouration. This system for categorising the wide and complex variation in appearance of great albatrosses has been instrumental in the discovery of several genetically isolated populations and consequent description of new taxa, and has made field identification easier.
