= John Douglas Gibson =

Australian ornithologist

John Douglas Gibson (1925 or 1926 – 21 May 1984) was an Australian amateur ornithologist who became an internationally respected expert on the Diomedeidae or albatross family.

Gibson lived in Thirroul, New South Wales all his life, and worked at the nearby Port Kembla steelworks. Doug Gibson's interest in ornithology soon focused on seabirds, and from 1953 he was involved in banding at the seabird colonies at the Five Islands Nature Reserve. This led to experiments with banding albatrosses and the first successful program of banding them away from their breeding sites. This led in turn to the formation of the New South Wales Albatross Study Group. With others in the group he devised the Gibson Plumage Index, which is named after him, as an aid to categorising and identifying the various great albatrosses. He is also commemorated in the name of Gibson's albatross, a subspecies of the wandering albatross Diomedea exulans, though sometimes treated as a full species, Diomedea gibsoni.

Gibson was a member of the Royal Australasian Ornithologists Union (RAOU) for 35 years, and he contributed many papers to its journal, the Emu, and other journals. He also served on the Barren Grounds Bird Observatory management committee and was instrumental in establishing the Illawarra Bird Observers Club in 1977.
