= Lindsay Smith =

Lindsay Smith may refer to:

- Lindsay Smith (ornithologist), Australian naturalist, ornithologist and conservationist
- Lindsay Smith (English footballer) (born 1954), English former footballer
- Lindsay Smith (Australian footballer) (born 1980), former Australian rules footballer
- Lindsay Stuart Smith (1917–1970), Australian botanist, naturalist and public servant
- Lindsay Smith (rugby league) (born 2000), Australian rugby league player

== See also ==
- Lindsey J. Smith, member of the Wisconsin State Assembly
- Linsey Smith, English cricketer
