= Diomedea milleri =

Diomedea milleri Temporal range: Middle Miocene

Scientific classification
- Kingdom: Animalia
- Phylum: Chordata
- Class: Aves
- Order: Procellariiformes
- Family: Diomedeidae
- Genus: Diomedea
- Species: †D. milleri

Binomial name
- †Diomedea milleri Howard, 1966

Species of bird (fossil)

Diomedea milleri is an extinct species of albatross in the genus Diomedea that lived during the Middle Miocene.

== Distribution ==
Diomedea milleri is known from the Temblor Formation of California.
