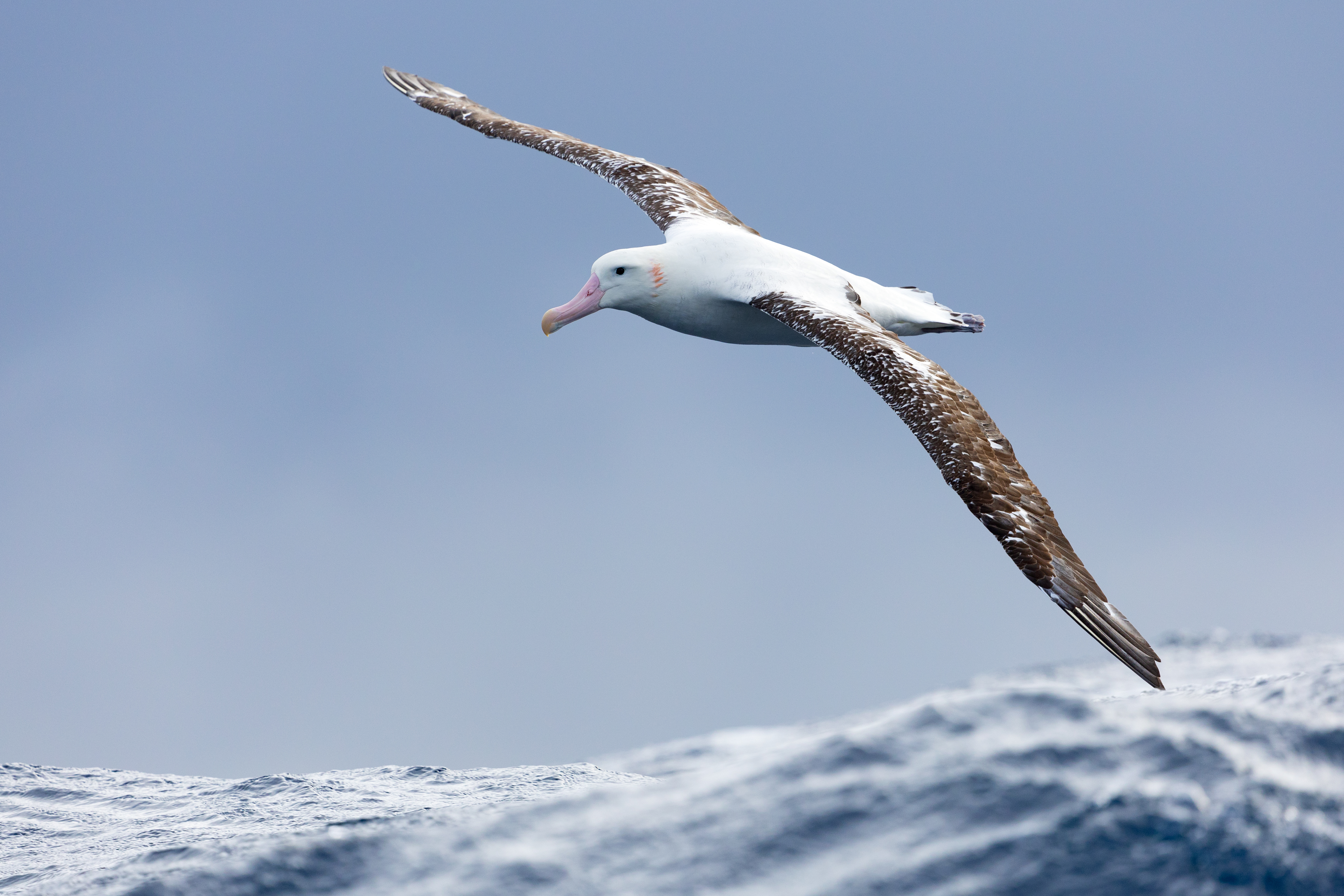
- Adult In flight off south-eastern Tasmania

Conservation status
- Vulnerable (IUCN 3.1)

Scientific classification
- Kingdom: Animalia
- Phylum: Chordata
- Class: Aves
- Order: Procellariiformes
- Family: Diomedeidae
- Genus: Diomedea
- Species: D. antipodensis
- Subspecies: D. a. gibsoni

Trinomial name
- Diomedea antipodensis gibsoni Robertson, CJR & Warham, 1992

Synonyms
- Diomedea exulans gibsoni; Diomedea gibsoni

= Gibson's albatross =

Gibson's Albatross

Subspecies of bird

Gibson's Albatross (Diomedea antipodensis gibsoni), also known as the Auckland Islands wandering albatross or Gibson's wandering albatross, is a large seabird in the great albatross group of the albatross family. It is found principally in the Auckland Islands archipelago of New Zealand, foraging in the Tasman Sea, with most individuals nesting on Adams Island. The common name and trinomial commemorate John Douglas Gibson, an Australian amateur ornithologist who studied albatrosses off the coast of New South Wales for thirty years.

== Taxonomy ==
Gibson's albatross was originally described as a subspecies of the wandering albatross with the trinomial name Diomedea exulans gibsoni. To authorities who accept the split of the Antipodean albatross from the wandering albatross, Gibson's is a subspecies of the Antipodean. To authorities not accepting the split, Gibson's is a subspecies of the Wandering. It is also sometimes considered a full species, Diomedea gibsoni, and the term wandering albatross is sometimes considered a species complex which includes the species D. gibsoni.

== Description ==
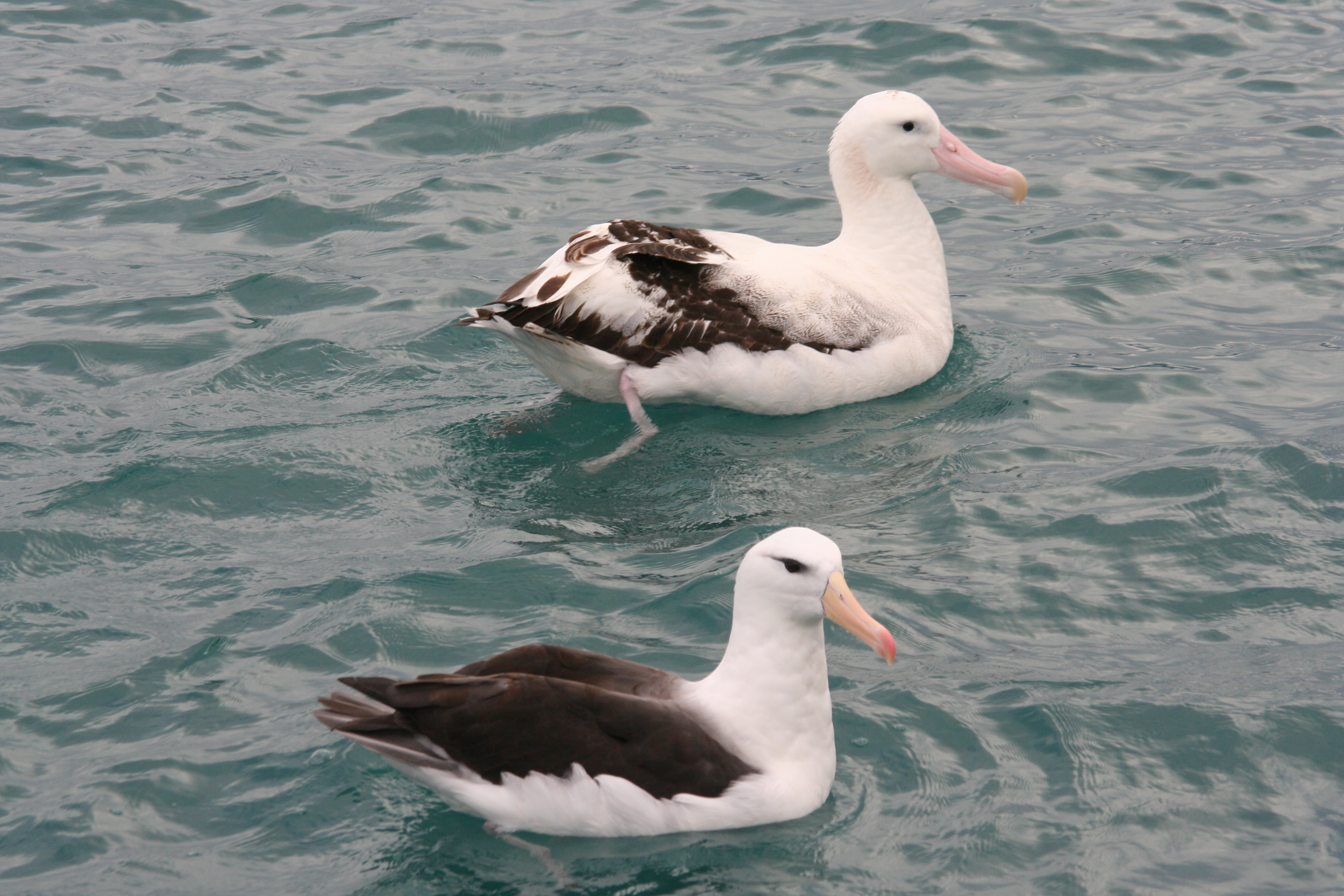
Size comparison – Gibson's (above) and black-browed Albatross

Similar in appearance to the wandering albatross, adult birds have white on the back, extending along the upper surface of the wings near the body. The white plumage of the head and body has fine grey barring. The upper wing has a black trailing edge, with black flight feathers and with mottled white patches on the black primary coverts. The underwing is white with a dark trailing edge. The tail is white with black edges, except in older males in which it may be completely white. The bill is pale pink. Females are slightly duller and smaller than males. The taxon is generally paler than the nominate subspecies of Antipodean albatross, D. a. antipodensis, which breeds mainly in the Antipodes Islands. Adult males have a mean weight of 6.8 kg (15 lb) and females of 5.8 kg (13 lb).

Plumage variation with age

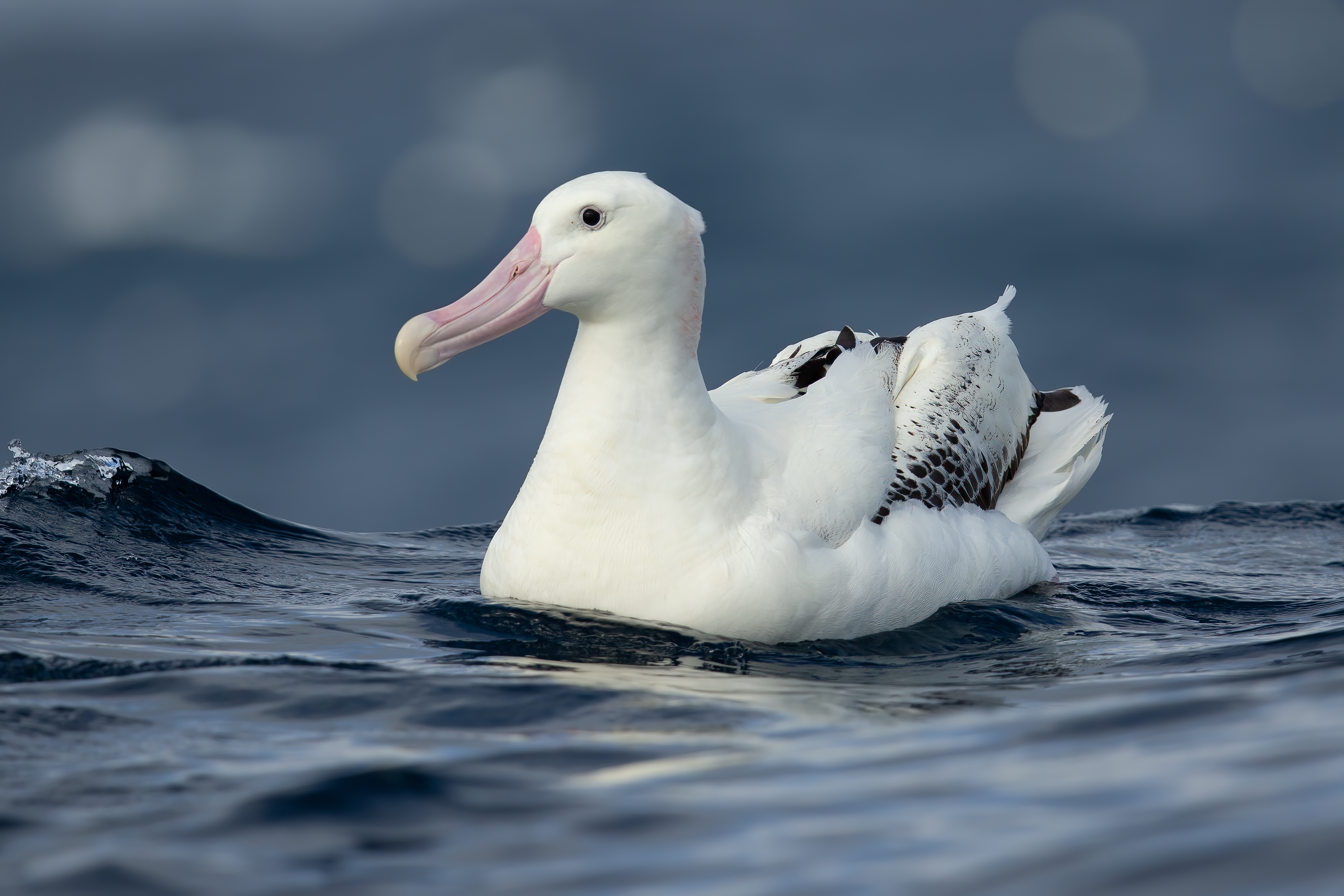
Older bird

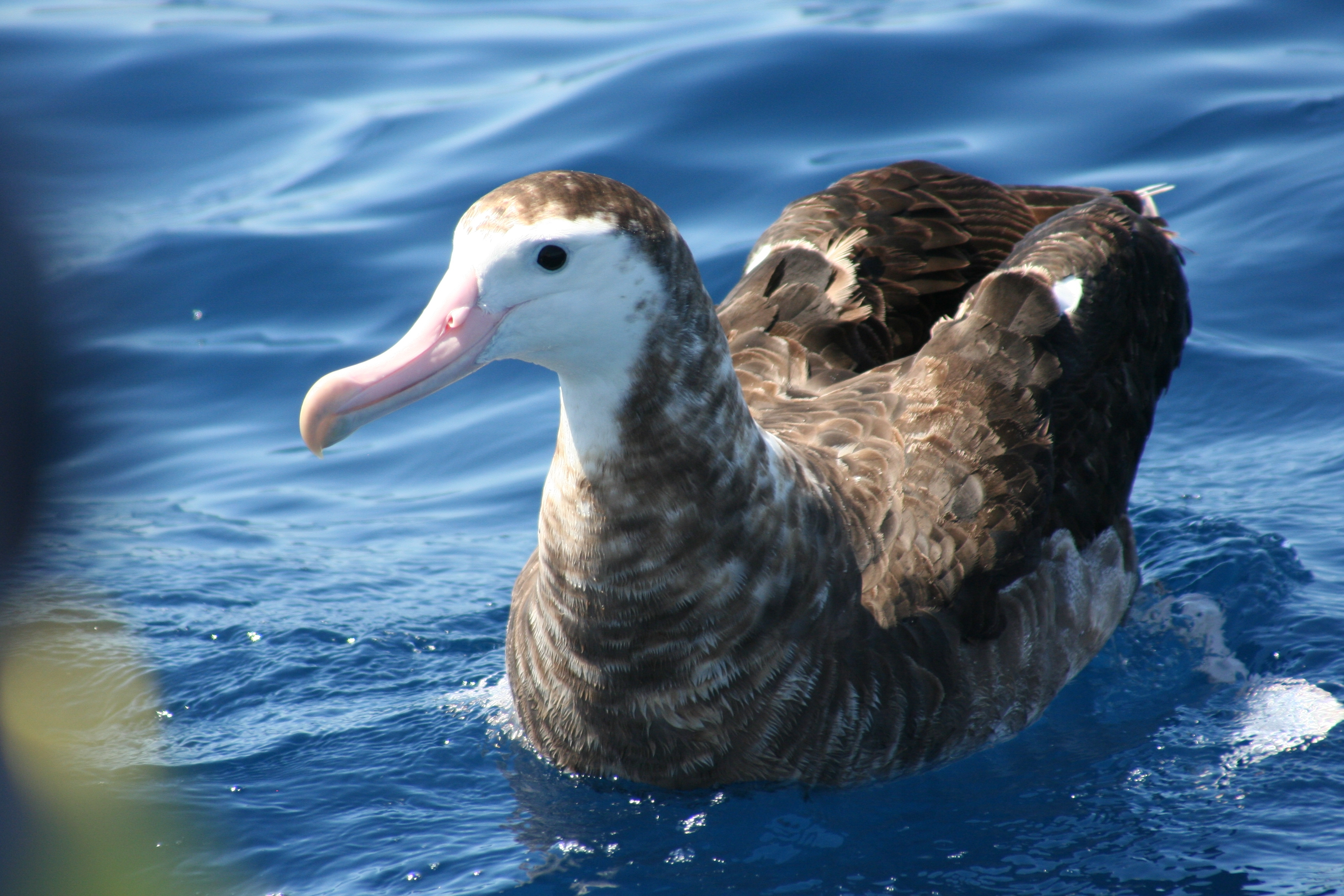
Younger bird

== Distribution ==
Gibson's albatross breeds only in the subantarctic Auckland Islands archipelago of New Zealand. Breeding females feed mainly in the Tasman Sea, while the males forage further south in the sub Australian or mid Pacific sectors of the Southern Ocean between latitudes of 30° and 50° S, especially the Roaring Forties where the weather systems assist their foraging. Though they may sometimes travel as far south as the edge of the Antarctic pack-ice in late summer, they are rarely seen south of the Antarctic Convergence in winter.

== Behaviour ==
=== Breeding ===
On their breeding islands, Gibson's albatrosses nest on moss terraces and in tussock grassland on or near ridges, slopes and plateaus where an exposed, windy position helps them take off. They often form loose colonies on the windward sides of the islands.

Breeding takes place only every two years, if successful; studies on Adams Island in the 1990s found an annual breeding success rate of 67%. Albatross pairs return to their breeding islands from November, with the older males the first to arrive. A raised mud nest is built for a single chick, with the egg laid in late December or early January. The nest is built mainly by the female, with the male gathering most of the material. The egg is incubated alternately by both parents in long, two to three week shifts, the first of which is undertaken by the male, while the non-incubating bird is away foraging, often in the Tasman Sea up to 1000–1500 km away from the nesting site.

The incubation period averages about 78 days with the egg hatching in early March. The chick is brooded by both parents in turn for four or five weeks, after which it is visited at irregular intervals by the parents separately throughout winter. The period from hatching to fledging lasts an average of 278 days, with the chicks fledging from mid-November to mid-December.

=== Feeding ===
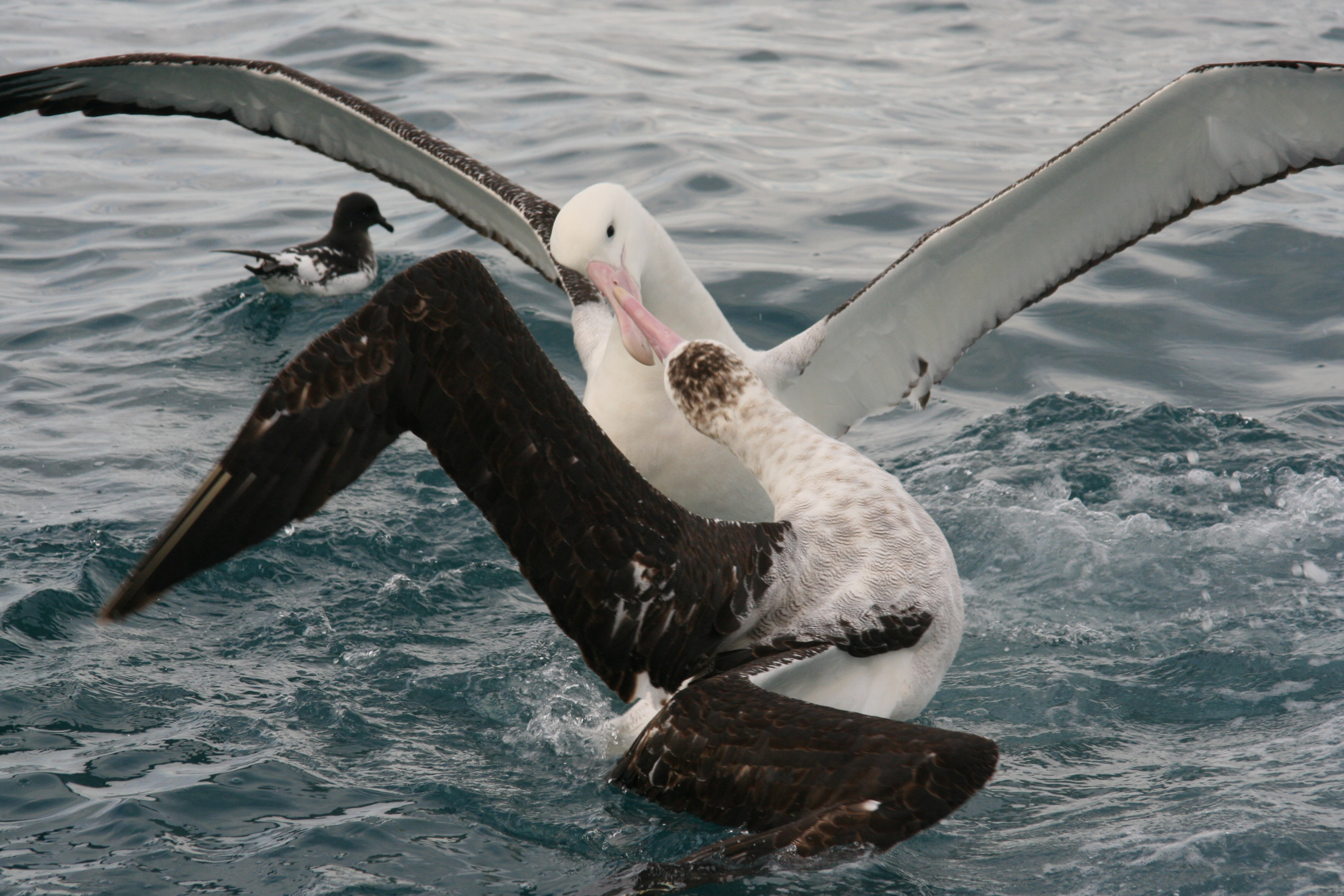
Two birds squabbling over food near Kaikoura, New Zealand, with a Cape petrel behind them

The albatrosses feed pelagically on fish, cephalopods and crustaceans. They feed on the sea surface or just below it, or make shallow dives from heights of 2–5 m (6.6–16.4 ft). Flying within 15 m (49 ft) of the sea surface they use the updraft from wave fronts for lift. In this way they cover long distances to search for food and often follow fishing boats to squabble for offal with other seabirds and dive for baits.

== Status and conservation ==
=== Population ===
The global population of Gibson's albatross comprises about 40,000 individual birds, with some 10,000 breeding pairs estimated in 1999. The Adams Island research found average annual survival rates of adult birds at 98% for males and 96% for females, with the difference not statistically significant. During the period from 1991 to 1997, an average 5831 pairs bred each year in the Aucklands, 65 pairs on the main Auckland Island, which has introduced mice, feral cats and pigs, 250 pairs on the much smaller Disappointment Island, and the remainder on the predator-free Adams Island. This represents a decline in numbers; the 1973 breeding population has been estimated at 20,000 pairs, and was probably much higher than that in the 19th century. Moreover, there has been about a 40% decline in numbers between counts in 1997 and 2009, and in adult survival, productivity and recruitment.

=== Threats ===
During the 19th century, nesting albatrosses were subject to sporadic, uncontrolled egg harvesting by sealers and other visitors to the Aucklands. Although this has ceased, from the mid 20th century onwards, the population has become increasingly threatened through bycatch mortality in the Southern Ocean longline fishery by the foraging birds being hooked, entangled and drowned. Other threats include starvation through consumption of floating plastic debris, and potentially, at their nesting sites, by human disturbance, the accidental introduction of rodents and other exotic predators, and by habitat alteration caused by climate change. Gibson's albatross is listed as vulnerable under Australia's Environment Protection and Biodiversity Conservation Act 1999.
