= Lorraine Island =

Island in the Recherche Archipelago

Coordinates: 33°57′00″S 122°33′46″E

Lorraine Island

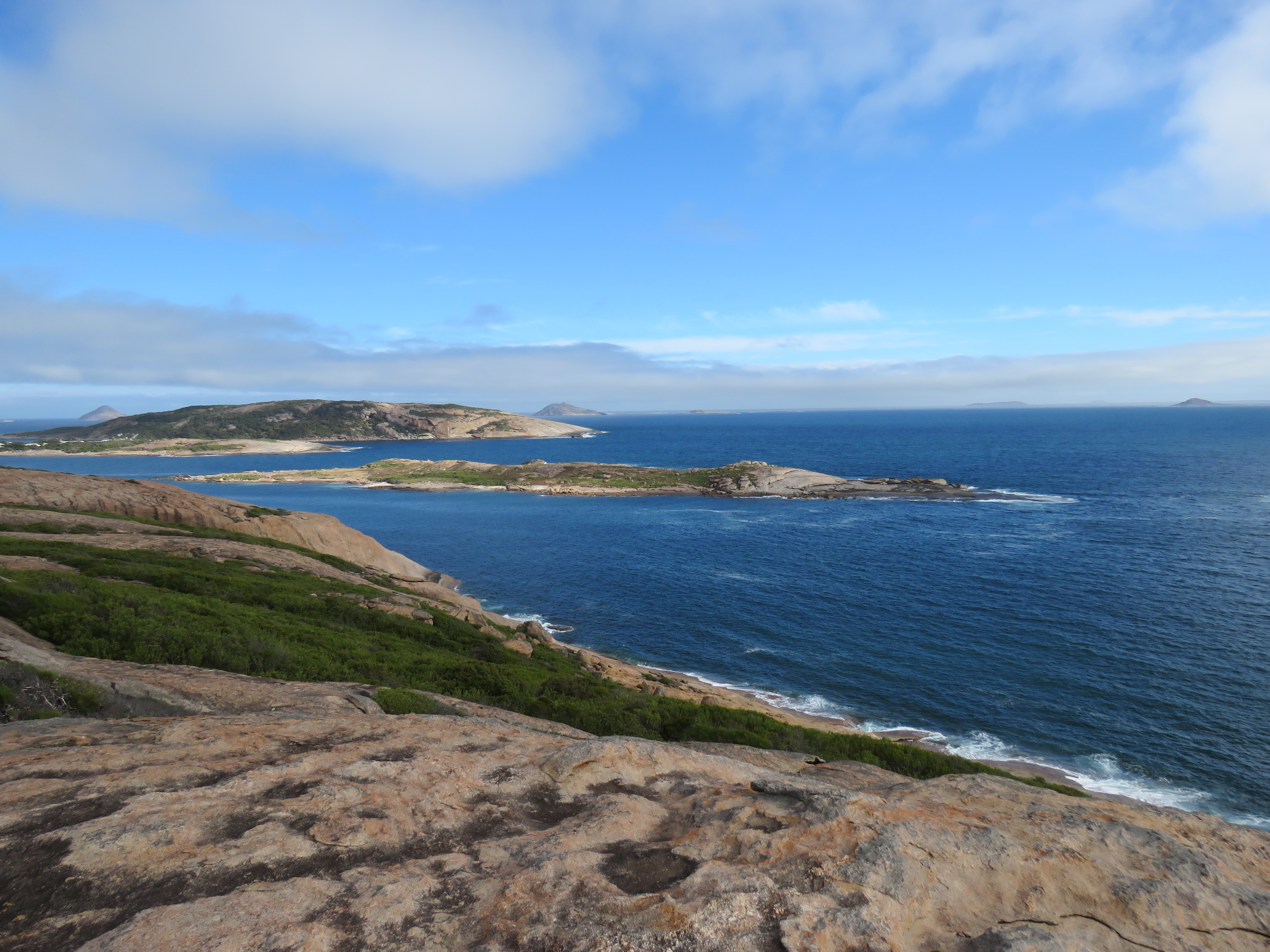
Lorraine Island, centre of the image, with Hammer Head in the background and the York Islands in the distance

Lorraine Island is an island off the South coast of Western Australia in the Recherche Archipelago. It occupies an area of 9 hectares (22 acres) and was named after Lorraine Faulds Lane (née Edgar), wife of Selwyn George (Bill) Lane.

The island supports a population of 2000 to 3000 pairs of white-faced storm-petrel.
