= Bill Lane (ornithologist) =

Australian ornithologist

Selwyn George "Bill" Lane E.D. R.L. (1922–2000) was an Australian amateur ornithologist who worked for the Sydney County Council for most of life until he retired in 1983.

== Career ==
Bill Lane joined the Royal Australasian Ornithologists Union (RAOU) in 1947, was a State Representative for New South Wales on that body from 1964 until 1967, and a Vice-President from 1968 to 1969. He was elected a Fellow of the RAOU in 1983. He was a founding member and President of the Australian Bird Study Association.

Lane banded Australian birds for half a century (from the 1950s to the 1990s) throughout Australia, and was an early experimenter with cannon netting. He also helped in the training of many of Australia's bird-banders. Lane published numerous articles in the Australian Bird Bander, Corella and Emu. He was instrumental in raising the awareness of the impact urban development has upon the habitat and distribution of Australia's native birds and other animals. He was awarded the inaugural John Hobbs Medal of the RAOU in 1995 in recognition of his contributions to amateur ornithology.

== S.G. 'Bill' Lane Award ==
The S.G. 'Bill' Lane Award is presented annually by the Australian Bird Study Association to the most outstanding student in ornithology at Charles Sturt University. Recipients of the award are:

- 2001: Cheryl Gole
- 2002: Helen Stevens
- 2003: Maria Grazia Bellio
- 2004: Lara Juliusson, of Denver, Colorado, USA.
- 2005: Gavin Jackson
- 2006: Alison Bowling
- 2007: Jennifer Nicholls, Leonie Daws and Philip Hughes
- 2008: Simon Robinson
- 2009: Dr Anne Lehnert
- 2010: Peter McGregor
- 2011: Bronwyn McCulloch
- 2012: Michelle Smart
- 2013: Mary Thompson
- 2014: Sara Judge
- 2015: Kirsty Wilhes
- 2016: David Smith
- 2017: Robert Faulconbridge
- 2018: Louise Williams
- 2019: Claire Williams
- 2020: Allison Roberts
- 2021: Ross McMillan
- 2022: Sang Tran
- 2023: Cecile Espigole

== See also ==
- Lorraine Island
- List of ornithologists
- List of ornithology awards
