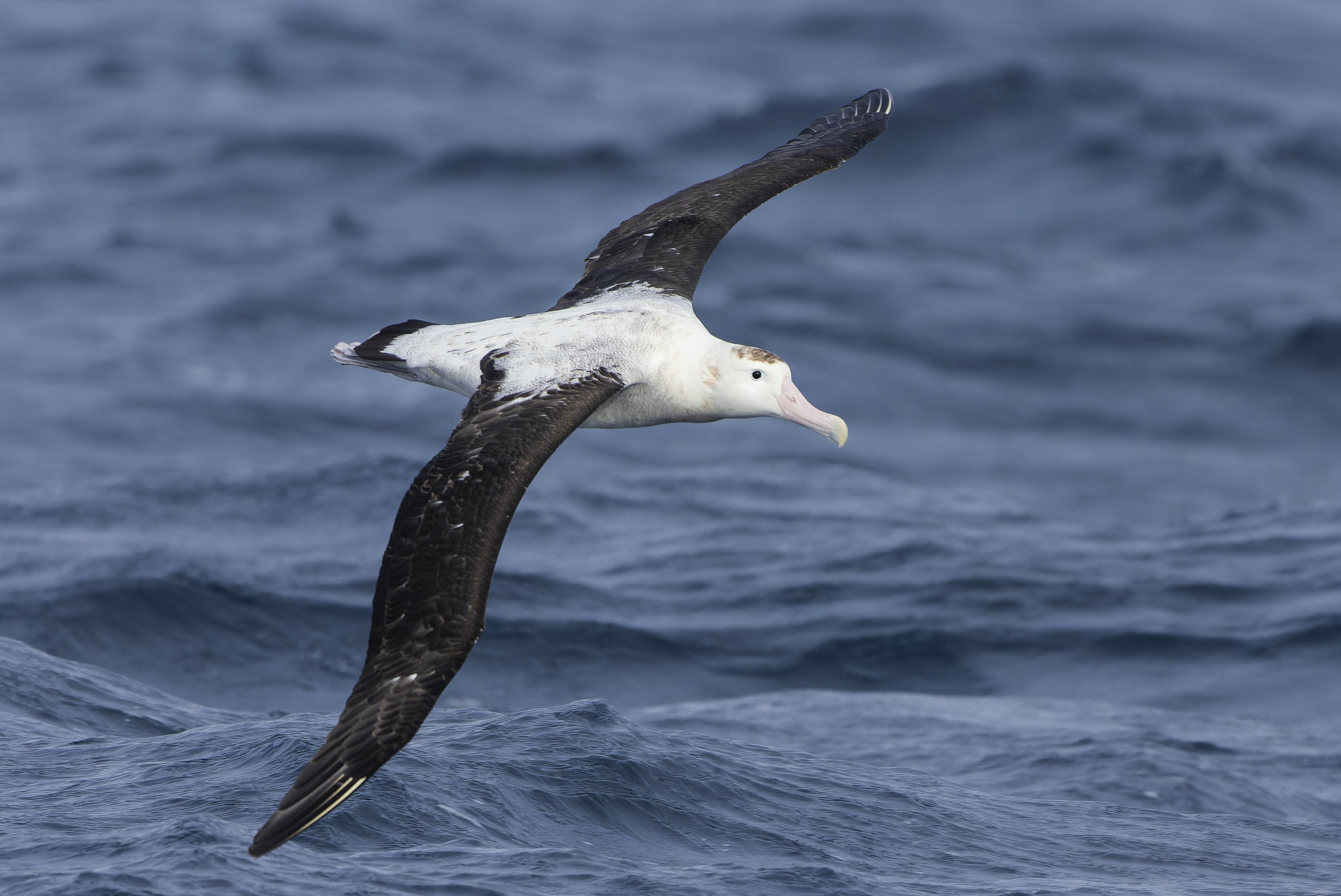
- Diomedea antipodensis antipodensis

Conservation status
- Endangered (IUCN 3.1)

Scientific classification
- Kingdom: Animalia
- Phylum: Chordata
- Class: Aves
- Order: Procellariiformes
- Family: Diomedeidae
- Genus: Diomedea
- Species: D. antipodensis

Binomial name
- Diomedea antipodensis Robertson & Warham, 1992

Subspecies
- Diomedea antipodensis antipodensis Robertson & Warham 1992; Diomedea antipodensis gibsoni

Synonyms
- Diomedea exulans antipodensis Robertson & Warham 1992

= Antipodean albatross =

Species of bird

The Antipodean albatross (Diomedea antipodensis) (Māori: Toroa) is a large seabird in the albatross family. Its recognition as more than a subspecies of the wandering albatross is relatively recent, and still not accepted by all authorities. Antipodean albatrosses are smaller than other former wandering albatrosses, now called snowy albatrosses, and breed in predominantly brown plumage, but are otherwise difficult to distinguish from young snowy albatrosses (snowy albatrosses grow lighter in color with age, while the Antipodean stays darker).

== Etymology ==
The name Diomedea antipodensis includes the genus name Diomedea after the Greek warrior king Diomedes, whose companions turned to birds, and the species name antipodensis, the Latin form of the Antipodes Islands, where they are found.

== Taxonomy ==
The Antipodean albatross belongs to the order Procellariiformes. Like all members of this order, they have naricorns, tubular nasal passages on their bill. They also have a unique palate with seven to nine bony plates. One of the great albatrosses of the genus Diomedea, it was only distinguished as a subspecies of the wandering albatross (now the snowy albatross) in 1992 and recognised by some authorities as a full species in 1998. While not all scientists believe it is a full species, retaining it with the wandering albatross, a 2004 study of the mitochondrial DNA and microsatellites of the wandering albatross species complex supported the split. Among the major experts, BirdLife International has split this species, Jim Clements did not before his death in 2005, and the SACC has a proposal on the table to split it.

=== Subspecies ===
There are two sub-species; however there was a study in 1998 that suggested splitting this species, though this was not accepted in a 2004 study.

Image	Subspecies	Distribution
	Diomedea antipodensis antipodensis	nominate race, breeds on the Antipodes Islands and Campbell Island
	Diomedea antipodensis gibsoni	breeds on the Auckland Islands

== Description ==
The Antipodean is large, at 110 cm (43 in) in length. Its breeding plumage is brown and white and its juveniles are similar in appearance to the snowy albatross. Breeding females have brown upper parts, and have white vermiculations on their back. Its face, throat, lower breast, and belly are white, and its undertail coverts are brown. Its underwings are also white, but with a dark tip. The bill of a small number of antipodensis, especially immatures and females, has a dusky tip to the lower mandible and can even appear to have a dark cutting edge to the upper mandible, like Amsterdam Island Albatross, especially when strongly backlit.

Breeding males are whiter than females, but not as white as the snowy albatross, and both sexes have a pink bill. The females of the nominate race have a dark brown breast band and the males have a darker cap, tail, and humeral flexure than gibsoni.

== Range and habitat ==
Breeding Population and Trends
Location	Population	Date	Trend
Antipodes Island	4,635-5,737 pair	2007	Declining
Auckland Islands	5,800 pair	2007	Declining
Campbell Islands	10 pair	2007	
Pitt Island	1 pair	2004	
Total	25,000	2007	Declining

At sea Antipodean albatrosses range across the South Pacific from Australia to as far as Chile, from the Tropic of Capricorn south. The gibsonii seems to range to the east of Auckland Island, and the nominate race ranges to the east to Chile. They breed on the Auckland Islands, Antipodes Islands, and Campbell Island.

== Behaviour ==
They feed predominantly on cephalopod and to a lesser extent fish (unlike other albatross species they are not recorded eating any crustaceans), and have been recorded visiting the spawning grounds of the giant cuttlefish off New South Wales. They nest on ridges, slopes, or plateaus, and will build their nest in the open or within patchy vegetation, such as tussock grassland.

== Conservation ==
The IUCN classifies this albatross as Endangered, with an occurrence range of 37,400,000 km^{2} (14,400,000 sq mi); although its breeding range is only 670 km^{2} (260 sq mi). A 2007 population estimate numbered between 4,635 and 5,757 breeding pairs on Antipodes Island, 5,800 pairs on the Auckland Islands (Adams Island, Auckland Island, and Disappointment Island), and 10 pairs on Campbell Island. There has been 1 pair breeding on Pitt Island, Chatham Islands since 2004. This places the total population at 25,300. Both breeding success (25%) and adult survival rates (80% female & 88% male) have been declining.

Pigs and feral cats are hurting the population on Auckland Island and longline fishing is still impacting them. Recent studies have shown that a rise in Tasman Sea temperature may be impacting gibsoni.

Banding has been an ongoing process, and will continue with satellite tracking of the species. Cattle and sheep have been eradicated from Campbell Island, and all the islands are nature preserves and recently became World Heritage Sites. Cats and pigs need to be removed from the Auckland Islands, the fisheries need to be worked with and the ocean temperature fluctuations need to be studied to help this species survive.
