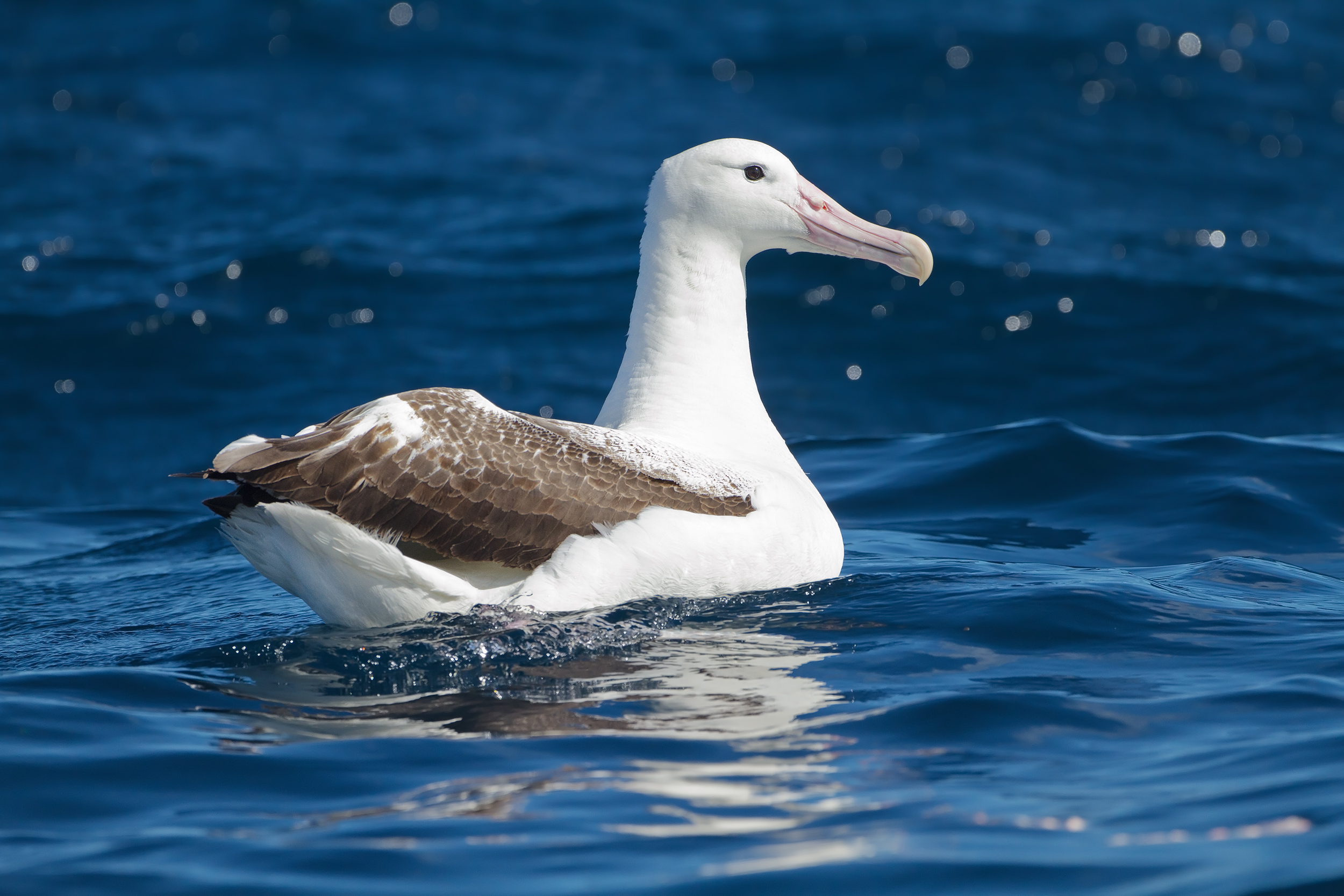
- East of Tasmania

Conservation status
- Vulnerable (IUCN 3.1)

Scientific classification
- Kingdom: Animalia
- Phylum: Chordata
- Class: Aves
- Order: Procellariiformes
- Family: Diomedeidae
- Genus: Diomedea
- Species: D. epomophora

Binomial name
- Diomedea epomophora Lesson, 1825

= Southern royal albatross =

Species of bird

The southern royal albatross or toroa (Diomedea epomophora) is a large seabird in the albatross family. With an average wingspan of more than 3 m (9.8 ft), it is one of the two largest species of albatross, together with the wandering albatross. Recent studies indicate that the southern royal albatross may, on average, be somewhat larger than the wandering albatross in mass and have a similar wingspan, although other sources indicate roughly similar size for the two species and the wandering species may have a larger average (and maximum) wingspan in some colonies.

== Taxonomy ==
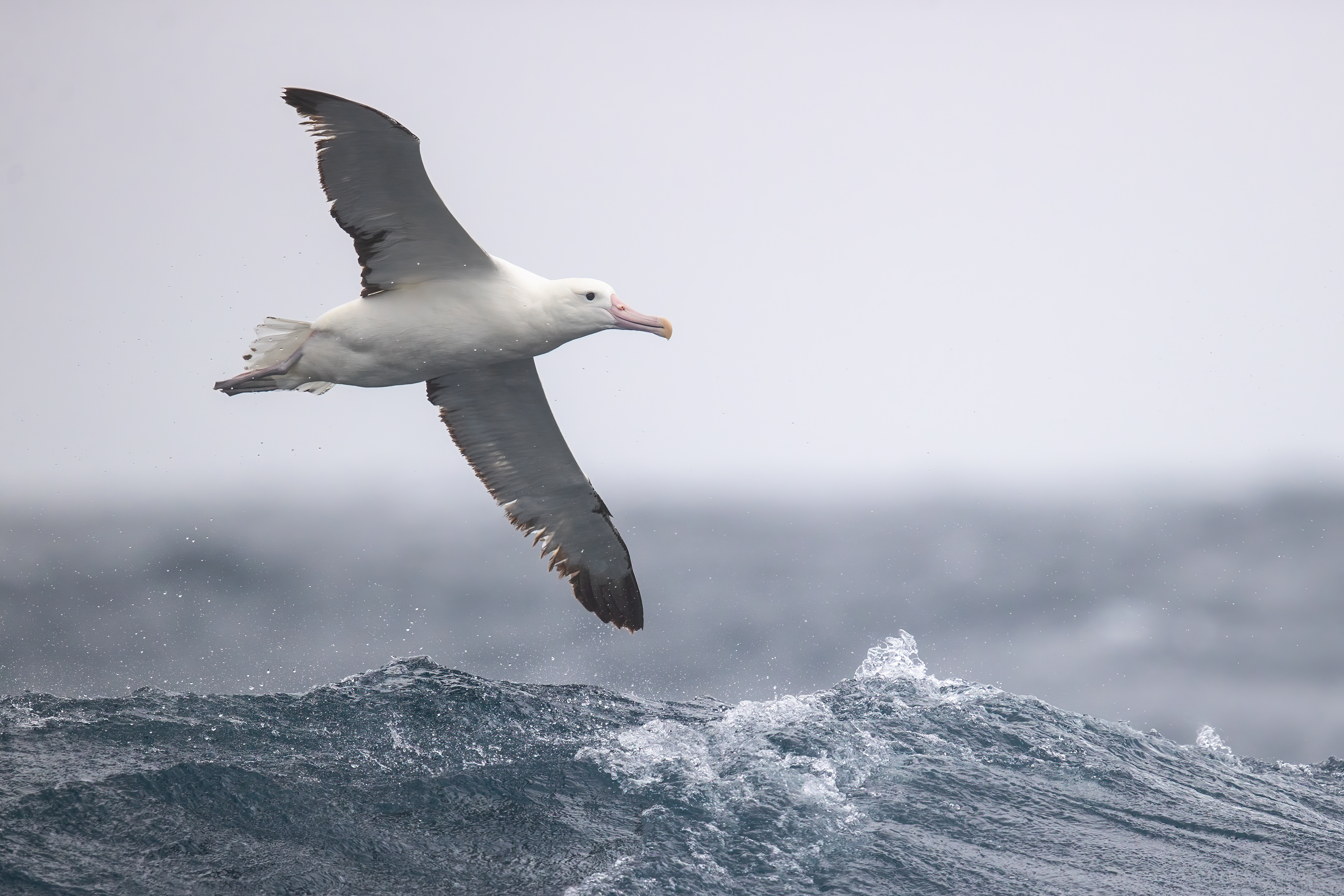
In flight

Albatrosses belong to family Diomedeidae of the order Procellariiformes, along with shearwaters, fulmars, storm petrels, and diving petrels. They share certain identifying features. First, they have nasal passages that attach to the upper bill called naricorns; the nostrils of the albatross are on the sides of the bill. The bills of Procellariiformes are also unique in that they are split into between seven and nine horny plates. Finally, they produce a stomach oil made up of wax esters and triglycerides that is stored in the proventriculus. This is used against predators as well as being an energy rich food source for chicks and for the adults during their long flights.

This species was once considered conspecific with the northern royal albatross (Diomedea sanfordi) as the royal albatross. The split into two species is widely though not universally accepted: it is recognized by, for example, the IOC World Bird List, BirdLife International, Brooke, and Robertson & Nunn, but not by Clements, while the American Ornithologists' Union has recognized the need for a proposal.

== Etymology ==
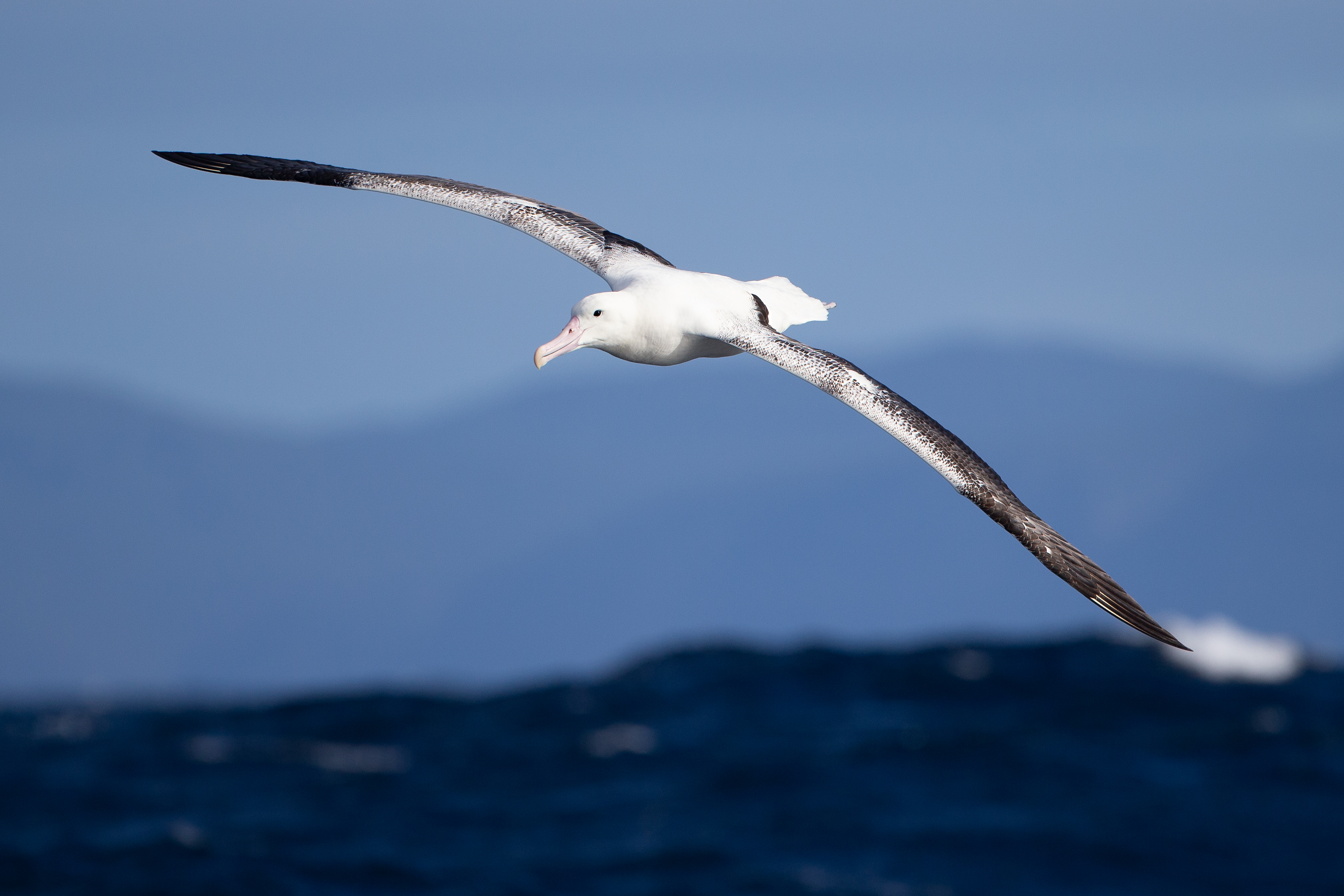
In flight

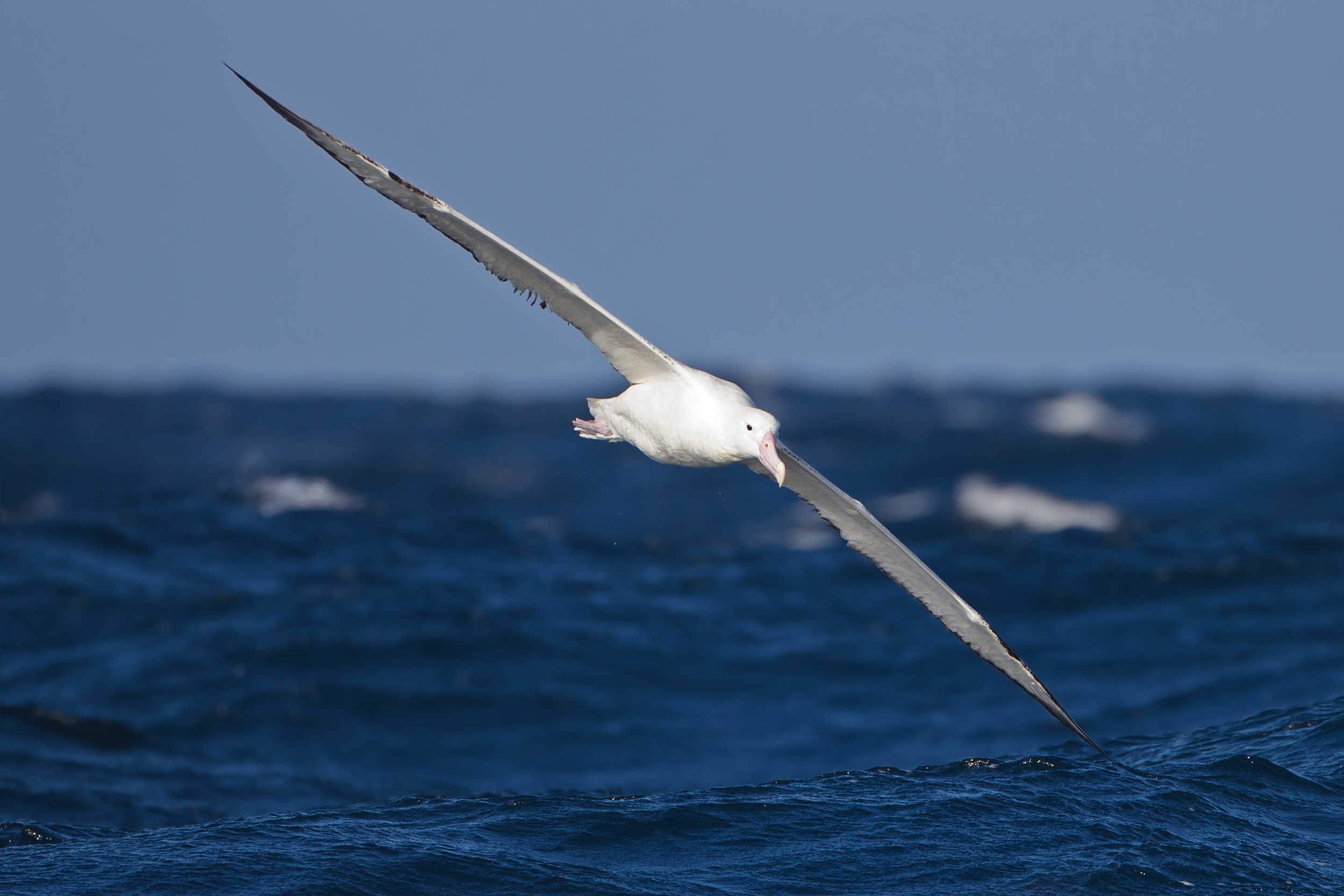
In flight

Diomedea refers to Diomedes, a figure from Greek mythology whose companions turned to birds.

== Description ==
The southern royal albatross has a length of 112 to 123 cm (44–48 in) and a mean weight of 9 kg (20 lb). At Campbell Island, 11 males were found to have a mean mass of 10.3 kg (23 lb) and 7 females were found to have a mean mass of 7.7 kg (17 lb), thus may be heavier on average than most colonies of wandering albatross. Males are about 2 to 3 kg (4.4 to 6.6 lb) heavier than females. Average wingspan has been reported from 2.9 to 3.28 m (9.5 to 10.8 ft), with an upper limit of about 3.50 m (11.5 ft). The wandering albatross can exceed this species in maximum size and averages slightly larger in linear dimensions if not bulk, but the two species are close enough in dimensions that size cannot be used to distinguish between them. The juvenile has a white head, neck, upper mantle, rump, and underparts. There are black speckles on the mantle, and dark brown or black wings with white flecks on coverts. The tail is white except for the black tip as is the under-wing. Young birds soon lose the black on their tail and backs. White appears on the upperwing gradually, as speckles starting from the leading edge. All ages have a pink bill with black on the cutting edge on the upper mandible, and the legs are flesh-coloured. Young birds with all-dark upperwings can be hard to differentiate from the northern royal albatross. There are clear but subtle differences from the wandering albatross, with the southern royal having a clean black and white appearance, lacking the peach neck spot often found on the wandering albatross. Most wandering albatrosses have dark feathers in the tail and crown and the white in this species expands from the middle of the wing, in larger blotches. The bill is also slightly paler, as well as the dark cutting edge along the middle. The average lifespan is 58 years.

== Range ==
Breeding Population and Trends
Location	Population	Date	Trend
Campbell Islands	8,200-8,600 pair	1997	Stable
Enderby Island	69 pair	2001	Stable
Auckland Island & Adams Island	20 pair	2001	Stable
Total	28,000-29,500	1997	Stable

Most of the royal albatross population is found between 30° S and 45° S. They range along the southern oceans concentrating on the west and east coast of southern South America, and also in the waters surrounding New Zealand. The majority of the world's population of southern royal albatrosses nest on the rat-free subantarctic Campbell Island, around 8,200 to 8,600 pairs. There are smaller colonies on Adams Island and Auckland Island in the Auckland Islands, 20 pairs combined, and 69 pairs on Enderby Island. Direct counts on Enderby Island using a helicopter and also on foot in January 2017 estimated there were 47 breeding pairs there. There are some sanfordi × epomophora hybrids at the northern royal albatross colony on the Otago Peninsula in New Zealand.

== Behaviour ==
They attract their mates using methods such as bill-snapping, clapping and gulping. Others ways also include sky-calling with outstretched wings, and neck and head stretched upwards.

=== Feeding ===
The southern royal albatross eats squid and fish, with smaller amounts of carrion, crustaceans, and salps. Its foraging activities normally take place within a 1250 km radius of the breeding site. Although they travel vast distances, royal albatrosses in general tend to forage in somewhat shallower waters and closer to continental shelves than wandering albatrosses.

=== Breeding ===
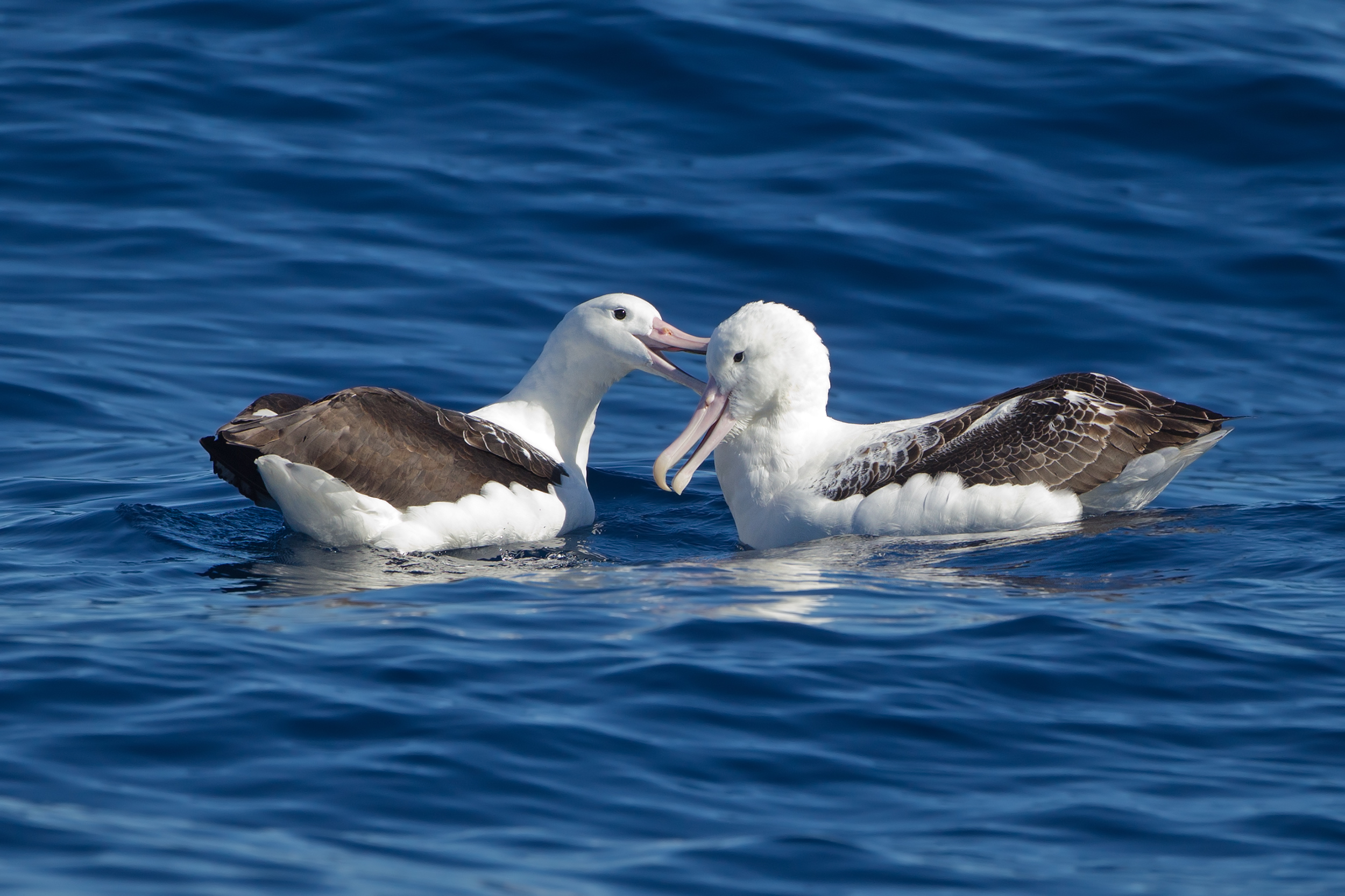

They prefer to nest on tussock grassland, plateaus, or ridges, and will lay one egg biennially. This will normally take place in November or December. Both parents will incubate the egg, and rear the young. After they are born it takes about 240 days for a baby to grow its wings fully and fly by itself. There is very low mortality rates of the laid eggs once the parents settle in. When feeding the young they will range south to the Campbell Plateau and north to the Chatham Rise.

== Conservation ==
The IUCN classifies this bird as vulnerable, with an occurrence range of 63,400,000 km^{2} (24,500,000 sq mi) and a breeding range of 750 km^{2} (290 sq mi), with a total estimated population of between 28,000 and 29,500 (1997). As a top-tier organism in its natural habitat, it has very few predators but major fishing industries are a huge problem for all albatross species among other seabirds.

The population is recovering from its severe downward spiral in the late 19th and early 20th centuries. By the 1880s, this albatross was extirpated from Auckland Island and Enderby Island. Pigs and cats are still a problem, as they take chicks and eggs, on Auckland Island. Longline fishing is a major problem and a possible emerging threat is Dracophyllum, a shrub that is taking away from their nesting range.

== Gallery ==
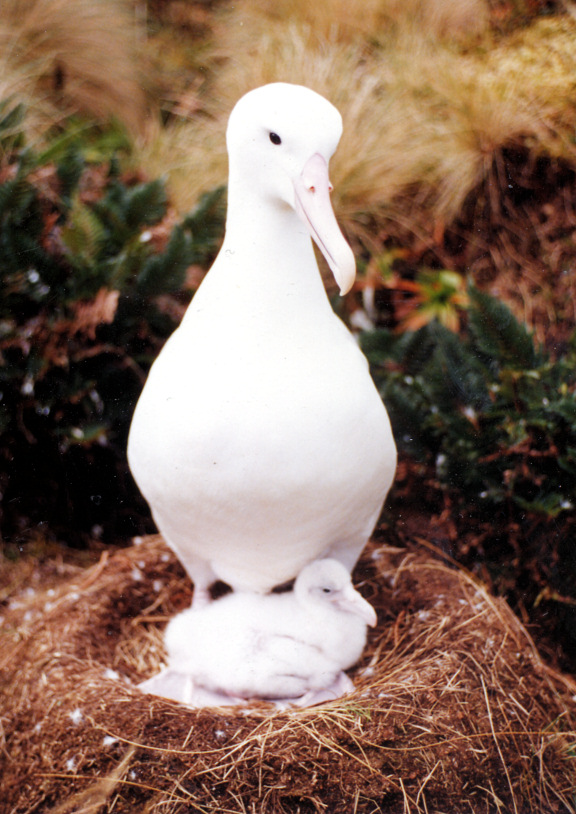
Adult with chick on mound nest on Campbell Island

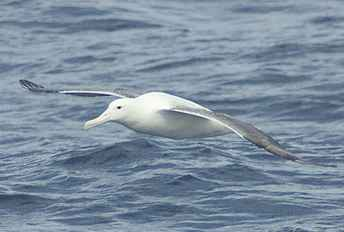
Southern Ocean, New Zealand

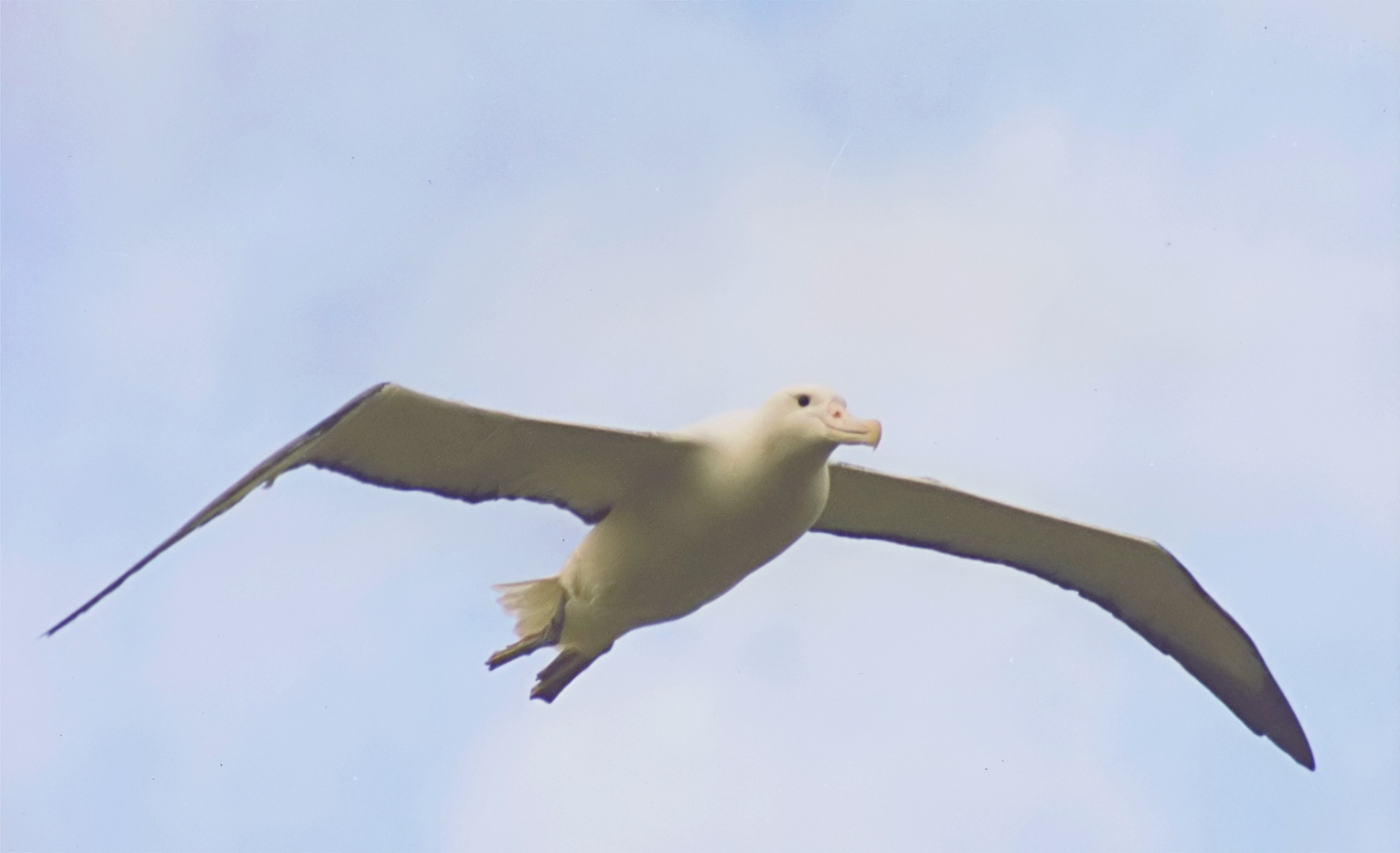
Southern Ocean, New Zealand

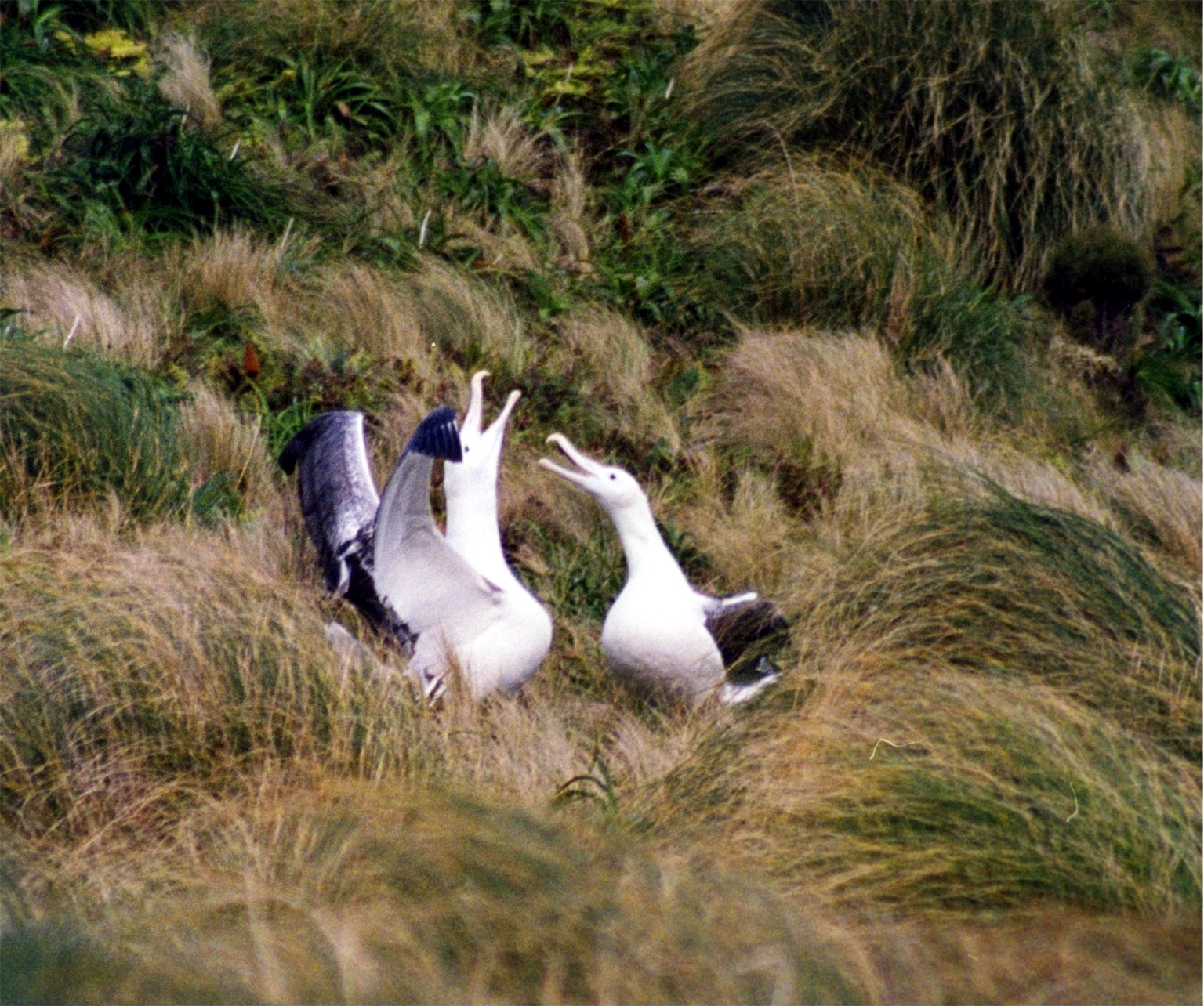
Pair on Campbell Island

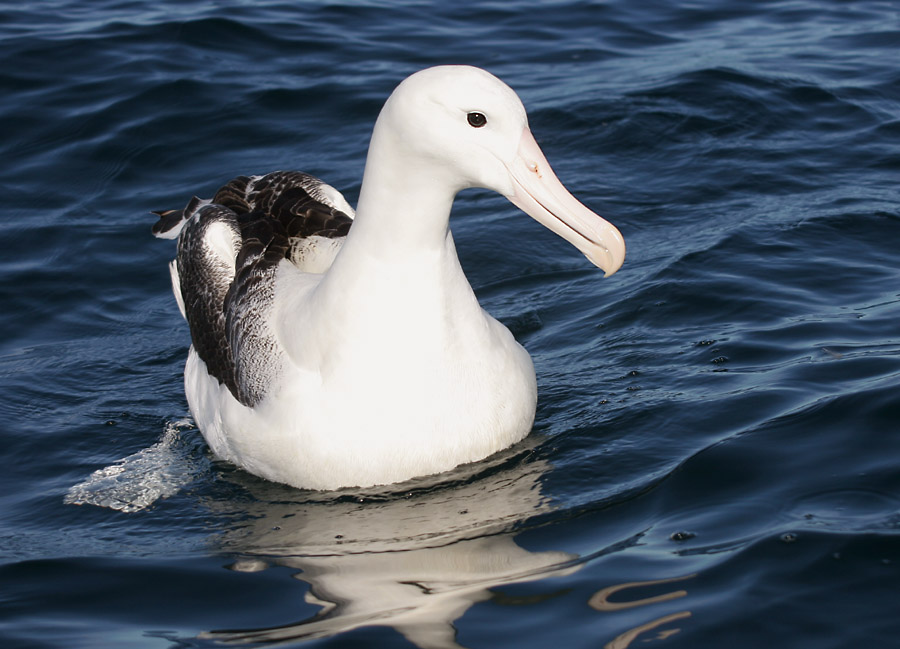
Off Kaikōura, New Zealand
