= Lindsay Smith (ornithologist) =

Lindsay E. Smith is an Australian naturalist, ornithologist and conservationist notable for his work towards the study and conservation of seabirds, especially albatrosses, along the Illawarra coast of New South Wales.

Although much of his career has been as a fitter and turner, he was employed by the Australian Museum in 1987 as an ornithologist to work at the Elizabeth and Middleton Reefs in Australia's Coral Sea Islands Territory.

In 1994 he was the founder, with Harry Battam, of the Southern Oceans Seabird Study Association, the inheritor of the long-term research work on albatrosses off the New South Wales coast begun by the New South Wales Albatross Study Group in 1956, and the longest continuous seabird study in the world.

== Honours ==
- 2004 - awarded the Medal of the Order of Australia for services to wildlife preservation through the Southern Oceans Seabird Study Association.
- 2006 - awarded the Serventy Conservation Medal by the Wildlife Preservation Society of Australia for outstanding wildlife conservation work involving seabirds.
