= Allan Roy Sefton =

Allan Roy Sefton BEM (1921 – 2 May 1989) was an Australian ornithologist, naturalist and environmentalist. Employed by the steelworks at Port Kembla he spent much of his spare time was spent studying the natural history and promoting the environmental conservation, of the Illawarra region of eastern New South Wales. He was a bird bander and a founder of the New South Wales Albatross Study Group. Since 1993, he has been commemorated in the Allan Sefton Fund which awards a prize to the best graduate of the Honours Bachelor of Environmental Science Program at the University of Wollongong, and by the annual Allan Sefton Memorial Lecture where a renowned Australian scientist is invited to deliver a lecture on a topic of environmental interest..

== Honours ==
- 1975 – British Empire Medal, for service to the community
- 1978 – Australian Natural History Medallion
- 1989 – Medal of the Order of Australia (OAM), for service to conservation
- 1989 – Honorary PhD, University of Wollongong, for contributions to environmental science in the Illawarra region
