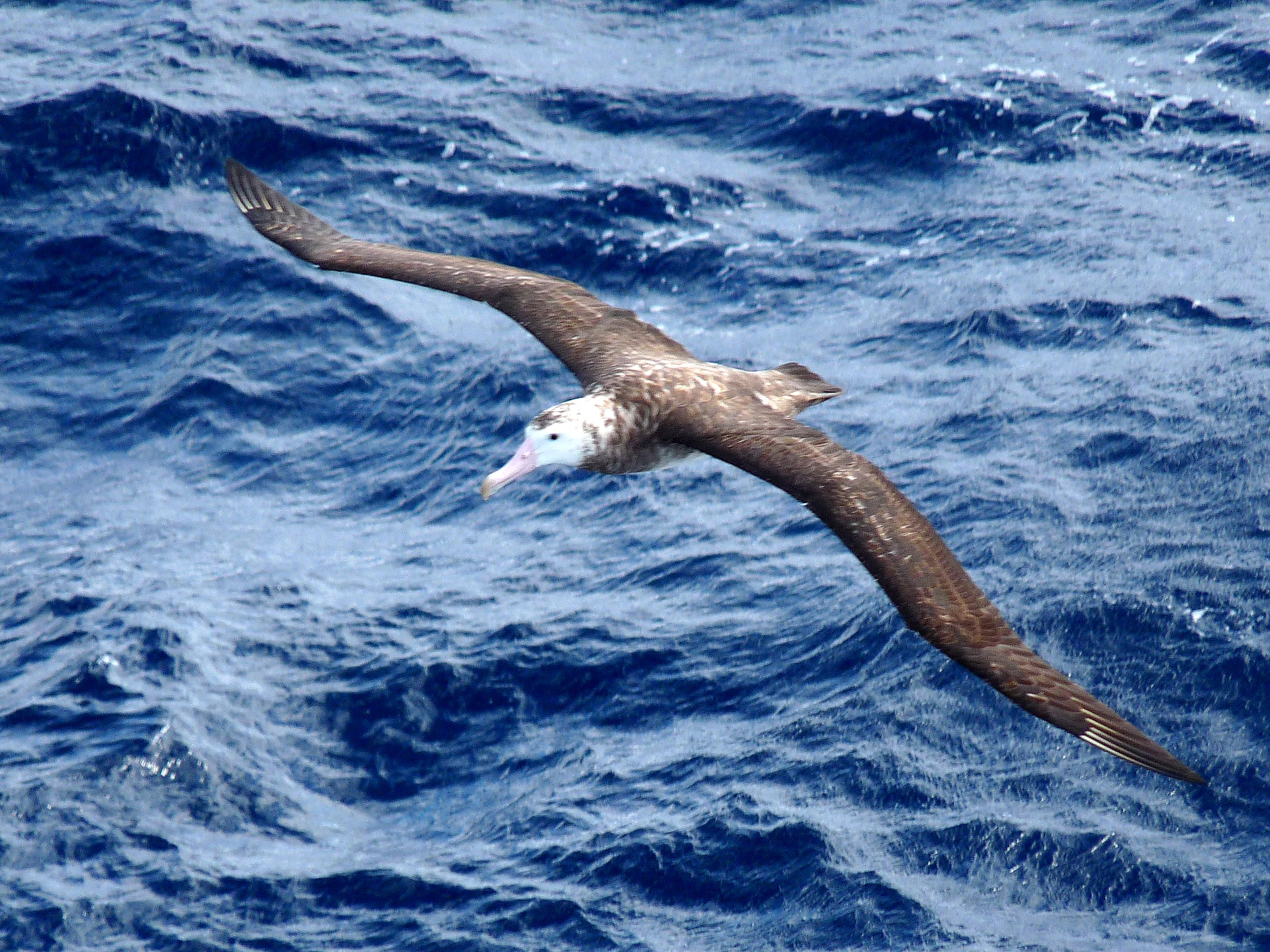

Conservation status
- Critically Endangered (IUCN 3.1)

Scientific classification
- Kingdom: Animalia
- Phylum: Chordata
- Class: Aves
- Order: Procellariiformes
- Family: Diomedeidae
- Genus: Diomedea
- Species: D. dabbenena

Binomial name
- Diomedea dabbenena Mathews, 1929

Synonyms
- Diomedea exulans dabbenena Mathews, 1929

= Tristan albatross =

Large species of seabird

The Tristan albatross (Diomedea dabbenena) is a large seabird from the albatross family. One of the great albatrosses of the genus Diomedea, it was only widely recognised as a full species in 1998.

== Taxonomy ==
Albatrosses belong to the family Diomedeidae of the order Procellariiformes, along with shearwaters, petrels, storm petrels, and diving petrels. They share certain identifying features. First, they have nasal passages that attach to the upper bill called naricorns, although the nostrils on the albatross are on the sides of the bill. The bills of Procellariiformes are also unique in that they are split into between 7 and 9 horny plates. Albatrosses also produce a stomach oil made up of wax esters and triglycerides that is stored in the proventriculus. This is used against predators as well as an energy rich food source for chicks and for the adults during their long flights.

While not all scientists believe it is a full species with some retaining it as a subspecies of the wandering albatross (now the snowy albatross), a 2004 study of the mitochondrial DNA of the wandering albatross species complex supported the split. Other studies have shown it to be the most genetically distinct member of the wandering albatross species complex. This may be due to it diverging from their common ancestor before all its relatives, or because it underwent particularly strong genetic drift. Among the major experts, BirdLife International has split this species,

== Etymology ==
Diomedea refers to Diomedes, whose companions turned to birds. The epitheton dabbenena refers to Roberto Dabbene, an Italian-Argentine ornithologist.

== Description ==
The Tristan albatross is practically indistinguishable from the snowy albatross at sea but is smaller and has a slightly darker back. It is 110 cm (43 in) from beak to tail and has a wingspan of up to 3.05 m (10.0 ft). The Tristan albatross also never attains the full white plumage of the snowy albatross, and its bill is about 25 mm (0.98 in) shorter.

== Distribution and habitat ==
Due to the difficulty in distinguishing them from snowy albatrosses, their distribution at sea is still not fully known, but the use of satellite tracking has shown that they forage widely in the South Atlantic, with males foraging west of the breeding islands towards South America and females to the east towards Africa. There have been sightings near Brazil and also off the coast of Australia.

Tristan albatrosses are endemic to the islands of the Tristan da Cunha group and more specifically Gough Island. The majority of the world's population nest on Gough Island, around 1500 pairs. On some years a pair breeds on Inaccessible Island.

== Behavior ==
The Tristan albatross feeds on fish and cephalopods.

They breed biennially and will nest in wet heath from 400 to 700 m (1,300–2,300 ft) in elevation. They are monogamous, and do not start breeding until they are about 10 years old.

== Conservation ==
They were formerly threatened by introduced species, rats, cats and pigs, but these have now been removed from their breeding islands. However, this resulted in the population of mice, Mus musculus, increasing to the point where they would eat and kill albatross chicks en masse. Even though the chicks are huge compared to the mice, they do not know how to defend themselves appropriately. Today the main threat to the species is believed to be long-line fishing and these mice. Recent counts suggest that the population on Gough has decreased by 28% over 46 years, whereas population modelling predicts annual decline rates of 2.9–5.3%. More recent modelling, conducted over three generations since 1980, suggests a decline equivalent to a >96% reduction in population size over three generations, since declines began. The rate of decline is therefore placed here in the band of 80–100% over three generations (86 years).

Formerly classified as an endangered species by the IUCN, it was suspected to be more threatened than generally assumed and undergoing a marked decline. Following the evaluation of its status, this was found to be correct, and the Tristan albatross was consequently uplisted to Critically Endangered status in 2008. They have an occurrence range of 14,000,000 km^{2} (5,400,000 sq mi) and a breeding range of 80 km^{2} (31 sq mi).

== Sources ==
- BirdLife International (2008a). "Tristan Albatross - BirdLife Species Factsheet". Data Zone.
- BirdLife International (2008b). "The BirdLife checklist of the birds of the world, with conservation status and taxonomic sources". Archived from the original (xls) on 18 October 2019.
- Brooke, M. (2004). "Procellariidae". Albatrosses and Petrels Across the World. Oxford University Press, Oxford, UK. ISBN 0-19-850125-0.
- Burg, T.M.; Croxall, J.P. (2004). "Global population structure and taxonomy of the wandering albatross species complex". Molecular Ecology. 13 (8): 2345–2355. doi:10.1111/j.1365-294X.2004.02232.x. PMID 15245406.
- Clements, James (2007). The Clements Checklist of the Birds of the World (6th ed.). Ithaca, NY: Cornell University Press. ISBN 978-0-8014-4501-9.
- Double, M. C. (2003). "Albatrosses (Diomedeidae)". In Hutchins, Michael; Jackson, Jerome A.; Bock, Walter J.; Olendorf, Donna (eds.). Grzimek's Animal Life Encyclopedia. Vol. 8 Birds I Tinamous and Ratites to Hoatzins. Joseph E. Trumpey, Chief Scientific Illustrator (2nd ed.). Farmington Hills, MI: Gale Group. pp. 113–116. ISBN 0-7876-5784-0.
- Gotch, A. F. (1995) [1979]. "Albatrosses, Fulmars, Shearwaters, and Petrels". Latin Names Explained A Guide to the Scientific Classifications of Reptiles, Birds & Mammals. New York, NY: Facts on File. p. 190. ISBN 0-8160-3377-3.
- Lee, James (6 Oct 2008). "Table 7: Species changing IUCN Red List Status" (PDF). IUCN RedList. BirdLife International. Archived from the original (PDF) on March 6, 2009.
- Remsen Jr., J. V.; et al. (7 Aug 2008). "Proposal (388) to South American Classification Committee: Split Diomedea exulans into four species". South American Classification Committee. American Ornithologists' Union. Archived from the original on 2009-02-21.
- Robertson, C. J. R.; Nunn, G. B. (1998). "Towards a new taxonomy of albatrosses". Albatross Biology and Conservation. Chipping Norton, Australia: Surrey Beatty & Sons Ltd. pp. 13–19.
- Wanless, Ross M.; Angel, Andrea; Cuthbert, Richard J.; Hilton, Geoff M.; Ryan, Peter G. (7 June 2007). "Can predation by invasive mice drive seabird extinctions?". Biology Letters. 3 (3): 241–244. doi:10.1098/rsbl.2007.0120. ISSN 1744-9561. PMC 2464706. PMID 17412667.
