= Australian Bird Study Association =

Corella
- Language: English

Publication details
- Former name: Australian Bird Bander
- History: 1962–present

Standard abbreviations
- ISO 4: Corella

Indexing
- ISSN: 0155-0438

Links
- Journal homepage

The Australian Bird Study Association (ABSA) formed as the Bird Banders Association in 1962 by a group of people interested in bird-banding and other aspects of field ornithology in Australia.

Since its inception, it has published a journal. Originally entitled Australian Bird Bander, the journal has been published quarterly under the title Corella since 1977.

They also manage a fund called the ABSA Fund for Avian Research.
