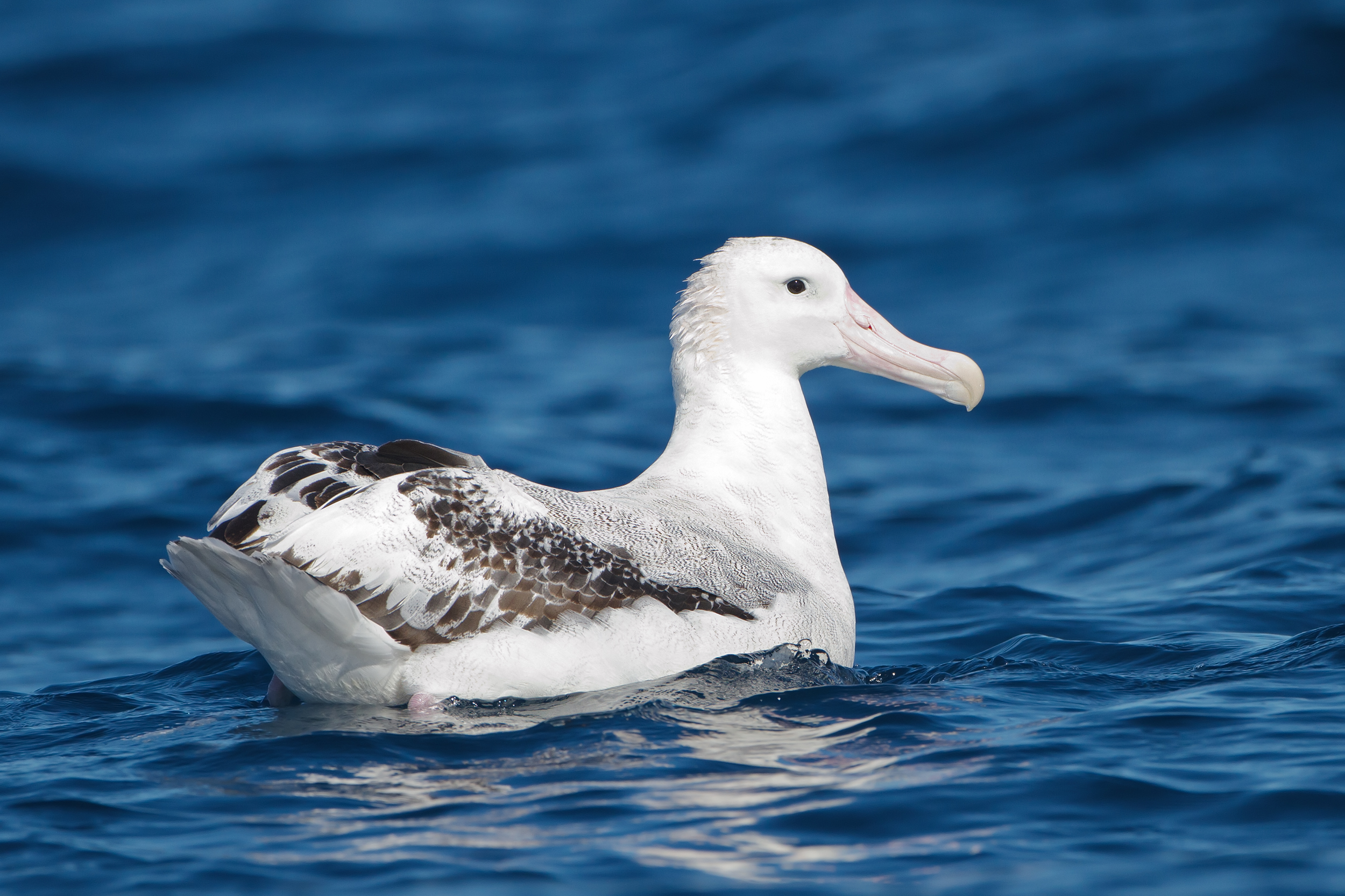

Conservation status
- Vulnerable (IUCN 3.1)

Scientific classification
- Kingdom: Animalia
- Phylum: Chordata
- Class: Aves
- Order: Procellariiformes
- Family: Diomedeidae
- Genus: Diomedea
- Species: D. exulans

Binomial name
- Diomedea exulans Linnaeus, 1758

Synonyms
- Diomedea chionoptera

= Snowy albatross =

Species of bird

The snowy albatross (Diomedea exulans), also known as the wandering albatross, white-winged albatross, or goonie, is a large seabird from the family Diomedeidae; they have a circumpolar range in the Southern Ocean. It is the largest species of albatross and was long considered to be the same species as the Tristan albatross and the Antipodean albatross. Together with the Amsterdam albatross, it forms the wandering albatross species complex, which some began referring to more recently as "snowy".

The snowy albatross is one of the two largest members of the genus Diomedea (the great albatrosses), being similar in size to the southern royal albatross. It has the greatest known wingspan of any living bird and is also one of the most far-ranging birds. Some individual snowy albatrosses are known to circumnavigate the Southern Ocean three times in one year, covering more than 120,000 km (75,000 mi).

== Taxonomy ==
The taxonomic history of this species is long and complicated. The species was first described as Diomedea exulans by Carl Linnaeus in 1758, based on a specimen from the Cape of Good Hope. Diomedea refers to Diomedes from Greek mythology whose companions turned to birds, and exulans or exsul are Latin for "exile" or "wanderer" referring to its extensive flights. The type locality has been restricted to South Georgia.

Some experts considered there to be four subspecies of D. exulans, which they elevated to species status, and use the term wandering albatross to refer to a species complex that includes the proposed species D. antipodensis, D. dabbenena, D. exulans, and D. a. gibsoni.

== Description ==
The plumage varies with age, with the juveniles starting chocolate brown. As they age they become whiter. The adults have white bodies with white and black wings. Males have whiter wings than females, with just the tips and trailing edges of the wings black. The snowy albatross is the whitest of the wandering albatross species complex, the other species having a great deal more brown and black on the wings and body, very closely resembling immature wandering albatrosses. The large bill is pink, as are the feet. They also have a salt gland that is situated above the nasal passage and helps desalinate their bodies, due to the high amount of ocean water that they imbibe. They excrete a high saline solution from their nose, which is a probable cause for the pink-yellow stain seen on some animals' necks.

=== Size ===
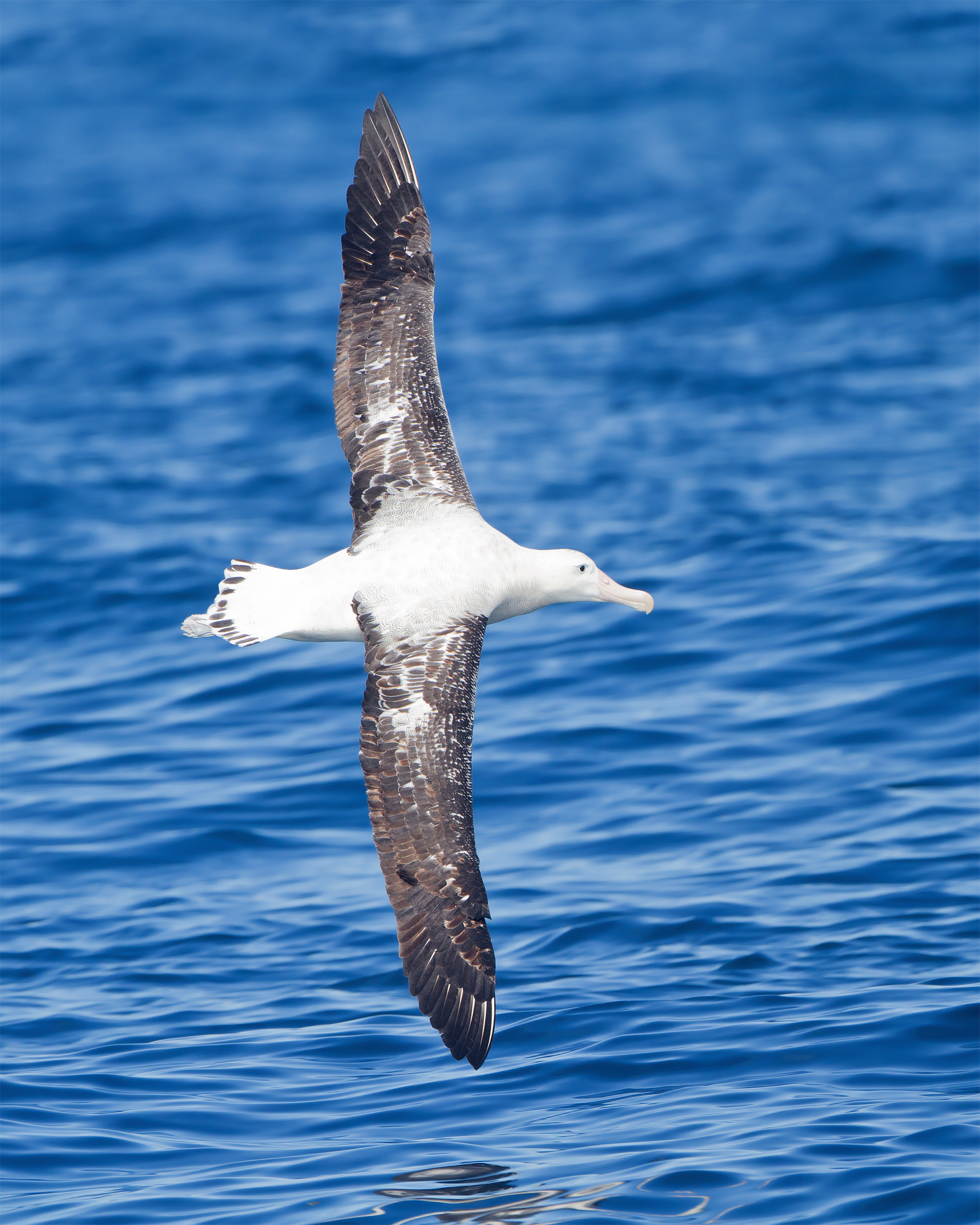
In flight

The snowy albatross has the longest wingspan of any living bird, reaching up to 3.7 m (12 ft), with a mean span of 3.1 m (10 ft 2 in) in Bird Island, South Georgia. Wingspan measured an average of 3 m (9 ft 10 in) in 123 birds measured off the coast of Malabar, New South Wales. On the Crozet Islands, adults averaged 3.05 m (10 ft 0 in) in wingspan. The longest-winged specimens have been about 3.7 m (12 ft 2 in). Two specimens have been reported having wingspans of 4.22 m (13 ft 10 in) and 5.3 m (17 ft 5 in), but these reports remain unverified. As a result of its large wingspan, it is capable of remaining in the air without flapping its wings for several hours at a time (traveling 22m for every meter of drop). The length of the body is about 107 to 135 cm (3 ft 6 in to 4 ft 5 in) with females being slightly smaller than males.

Adults can weigh from 5.9 to 12.7 kg (13 to 28 lb), although most will weigh 6.35 to 11.91 kg (14.0 to 26.3 lb). On Macquarie Island, three males averaged 8.4 kg (19 lb) and three females averaged 6.2 kg (14 lb). In parts of the Crozet Islands, males averaged 9.44 kg (20.8 lb) while females averaged 7.84 kg (17.3 lb). In another study with birds from the Crozet Islands, three females averaged 8.5 kg (19 lb) and three males averaged 9.6 kg (21 lb). On South Georgia, 52 males were found to average 9.11 kg (20.1 lb) while 53 females were found to average 7.27 kg (16.0 lb). On Île de la Possession, adult male snowy albatrosses averaged 10.92 kg (24.1 lb) while adult females averaged 8.87 kg (19.6 lb). Another sampling of adult body masses from the same colony found males to average 11.09 kg (24.4 lb) and females to average 9.1 kg (20 lb). Immature birds have been recorded weighing as much as 16.1 kg (35 lb) during their first flights (at which time they may still have fat reserves that will be shed as they continue to fly). On South Georgia, fledglings were found to average 10.9 kg (24 lb). Albatrosses from outside the "snowy" wandering albatross group (D. exulans) are smaller but are now generally deemed to belong to different species.

== Distribution and habitat ==
The snowy albatross breeds on South Georgia Island, Crozet Islands, Kerguelen Islands, Prince Edward Islands, and Macquarie Island, is seen feeding year-round off the Kaikōura Peninsula on the east coast of the South Island of New Zealand, and ranges in all the southern oceans from 28° to 60°. Some individual snowy albatrosses are known to circumnavigate the Southern Ocean three times, covering more than 120,000 km (75,000 mi), in one year. Snowy albatrosses spend most of their life in flight, landing only to breed and feed. Distances traveled each year are difficult to measure, but one banded bird was recorded traveling 6,000 km (3,700 mi) in twelve days.

== Behavior ==
=== Feeding ===
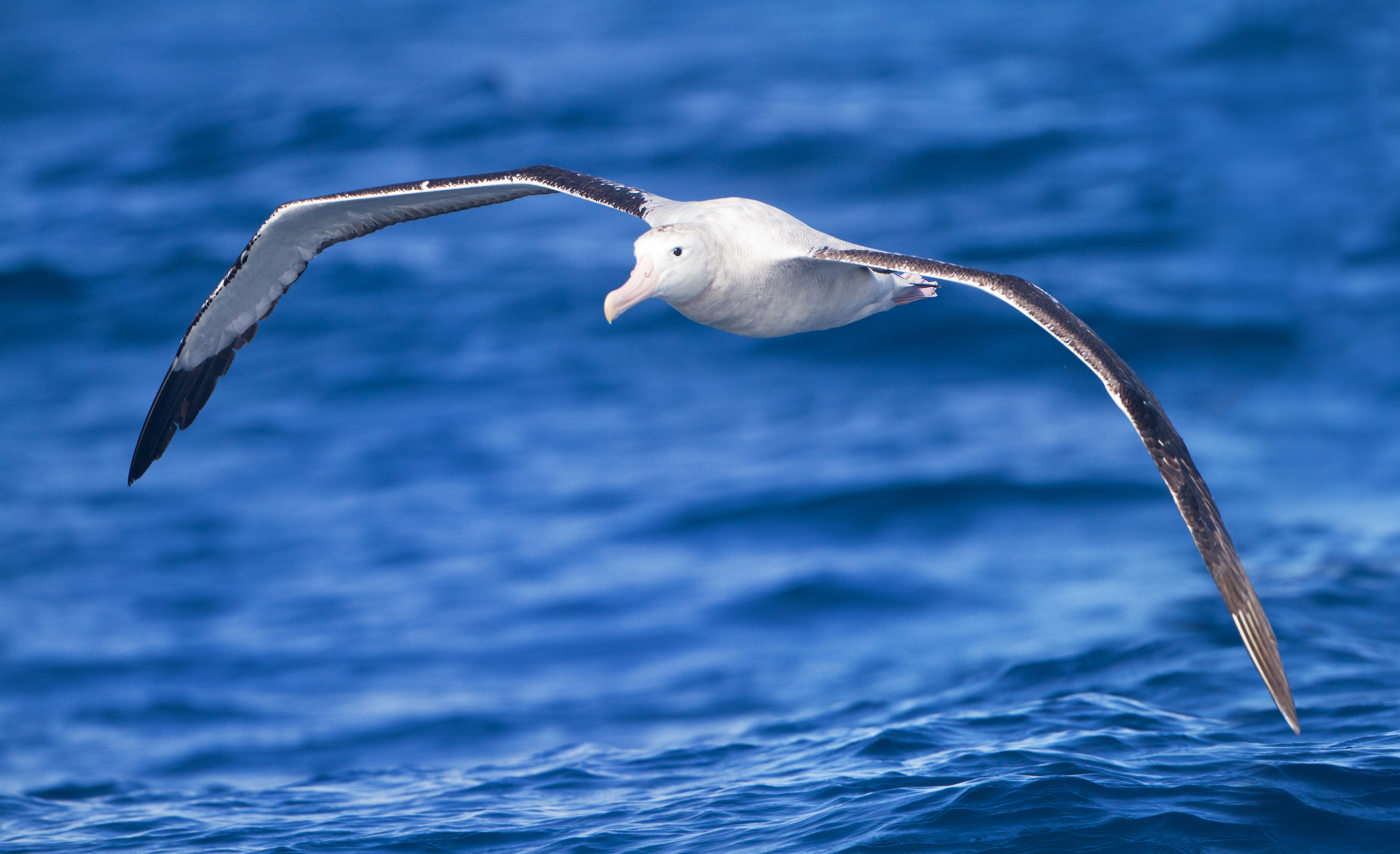
Snowy albatrosses have the longest wingspan of any living bird.

Snowy albatrosses travel vast distances to find food, and tend to feed further out in open oceans and in colder waters further south, whereas other albatross such as the related royal albatross tend to forage in somewhat shallower waters and closer to continental shelves. They feed at the surface, mainly during daylight hours, and are not well adapted for diving. During flight, speeds of 135 km/h (84 mph) have been recorded. They feed on cephalopods, small fish, and crustaceans. The species has been shown to be attracted to fishing vessels, foraging on bait, caught fish, and offal.

=== Reproduction ===
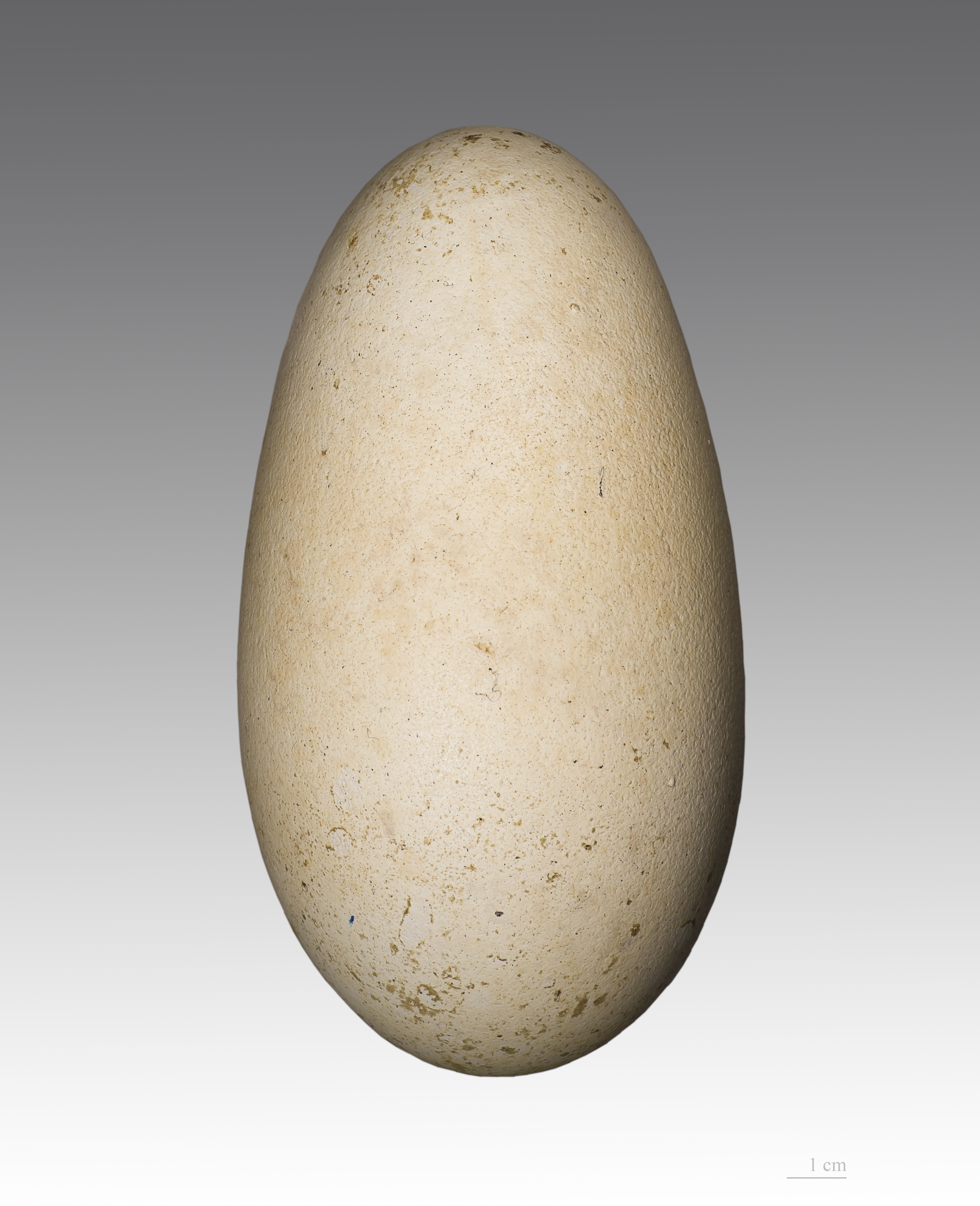
Egg of Diomedea exulans

The snowy albatross mates for life and breeds every other year. At breeding time they occupy loose colonies on isolated island groups in the Southern Ocean. When courting they will spread their wings, wave their heads, and rap their bills together while braying. Wanderers have a large range of displays from screams and whistles to grunts and bill clapping. They lay one egg that is white, with a few spots, and is about 10 cm (3.9 in) long. They lay between 10 December and 5 January. The nests are large bowls built of grassy vegetation and soil peat, that is 1 meter wide at the base and half a meter wide at the apex. Incubation takes about 11 weeks and both parents are involved. The 11-week incubation period is among the longest of any bird. During the early stages of the chick's development, the parents take turns sitting on the nest while the other searches for food. Later, both adults search for food and visit the chick at irregular intervals. Researchers previously assumed that chicks went without food for the whole winter after a weaning period of roughly 12 to 16 weeks. Later studies disproved this concept, as chicks were found to be feeding during this period. They are a monogamous species, usually for life. Adolescents return to the colony within six years; however, they will not start breeding until 11 to 15 years. About 31.5% of fledglings survive. They can live for over 50 years.

== Relationship with humans ==
Individual taking off

Sailors used to capture the birds for their long wing bones, from which they made tobacco pipe stems. The early explorers of the great Southern Sea were cheered by the companionship of the albatross in their dreary solitudes, and as shown in Coleridge's The Rime of the Ancient Mariner killing them was seen as extremely bad luck. The metaphor of "an albatross around his neck" also comes from the poem and indicates an unwanted burden causing anxiety or hindrance. In the days of sail the bird often accompanied ships for days, not merely following a ship, but wheeling in wide circles around it without ever being observed to land on the water. The bird would continue its flight, apparently untired, in tempestuous as well as moderate weather.

The Māori of New Zealand used albatrosses as a food source. They caught them using baited hooks. Because the wing bones of albatross are light but very strong, Māori used them to make a number of different items including kōauau (flutes), needles, tattooing chisel blades, and barbs for fish hooks.

=== Conservation ===
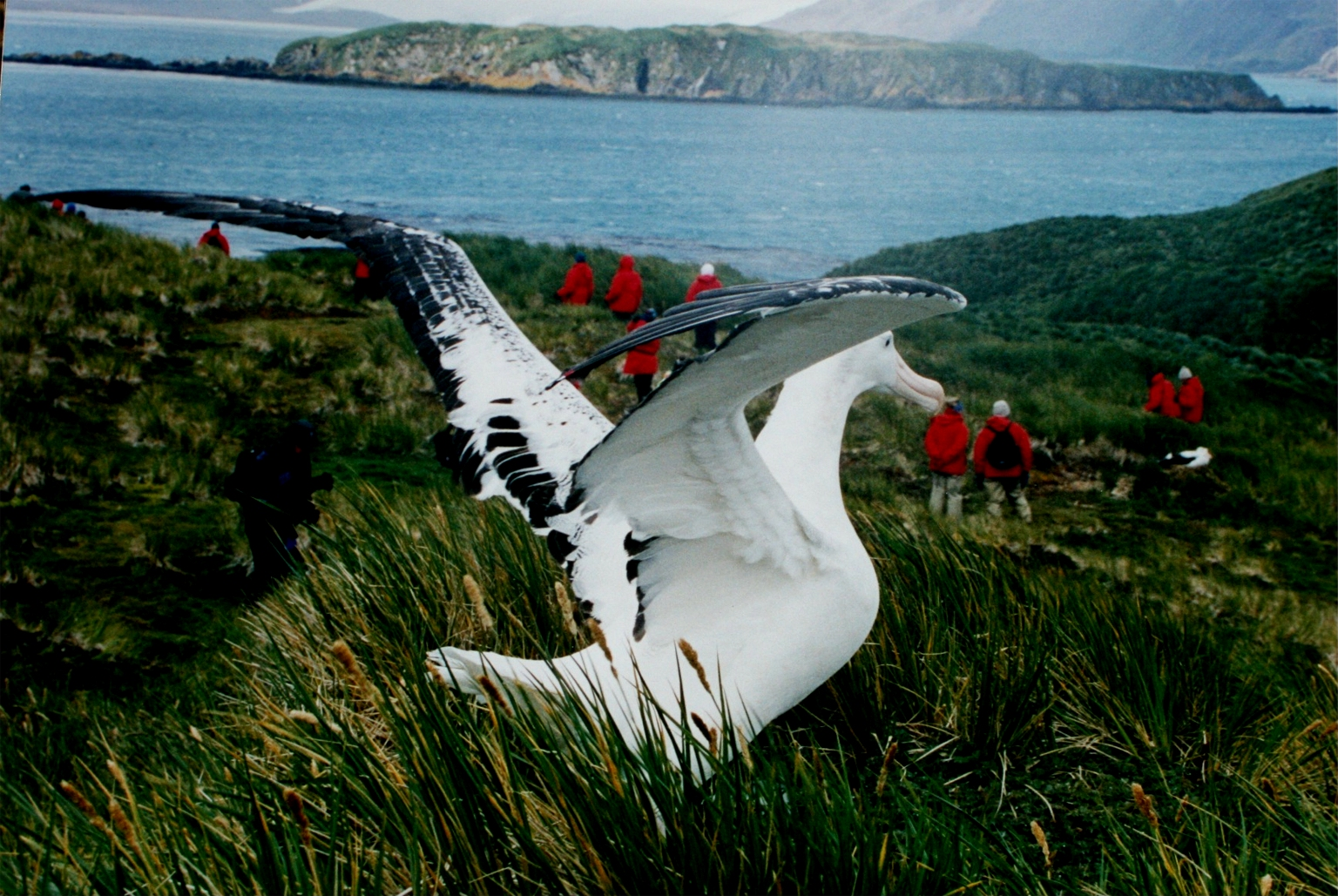
Snowy albatross at South Georgia Island

The IUCN lists the snowy albatross as vulnerable status. Adult mortality is 5% to 7.8% per year as of 2003. It has an occurrence range of 64,700,000 km^{2} (25,000,000 sq mi), although its breeding range is only 1,900 km^{2} (730 sq mi).

The biggest threat to their survival is that they are attracted by the bait for longline fishing and get caught in the same way as the fish; however, pollution is also taking a toll, mainly from plastics and abandoned fishing hooks. The CCAMLR has introduced measures to reduce bycatch of albatrosses around South Georgia by 99%, and other regional fishing commissions are taking similar measures to reduce fatalities. The Prince Edward Islands are a nature preserve, the Macquarie Islands are a World Heritage site, and large parts of the Crozet Islands and the Kerguelen Islands are nature reserves.
