= Tussock grassland =

Type of open grassland

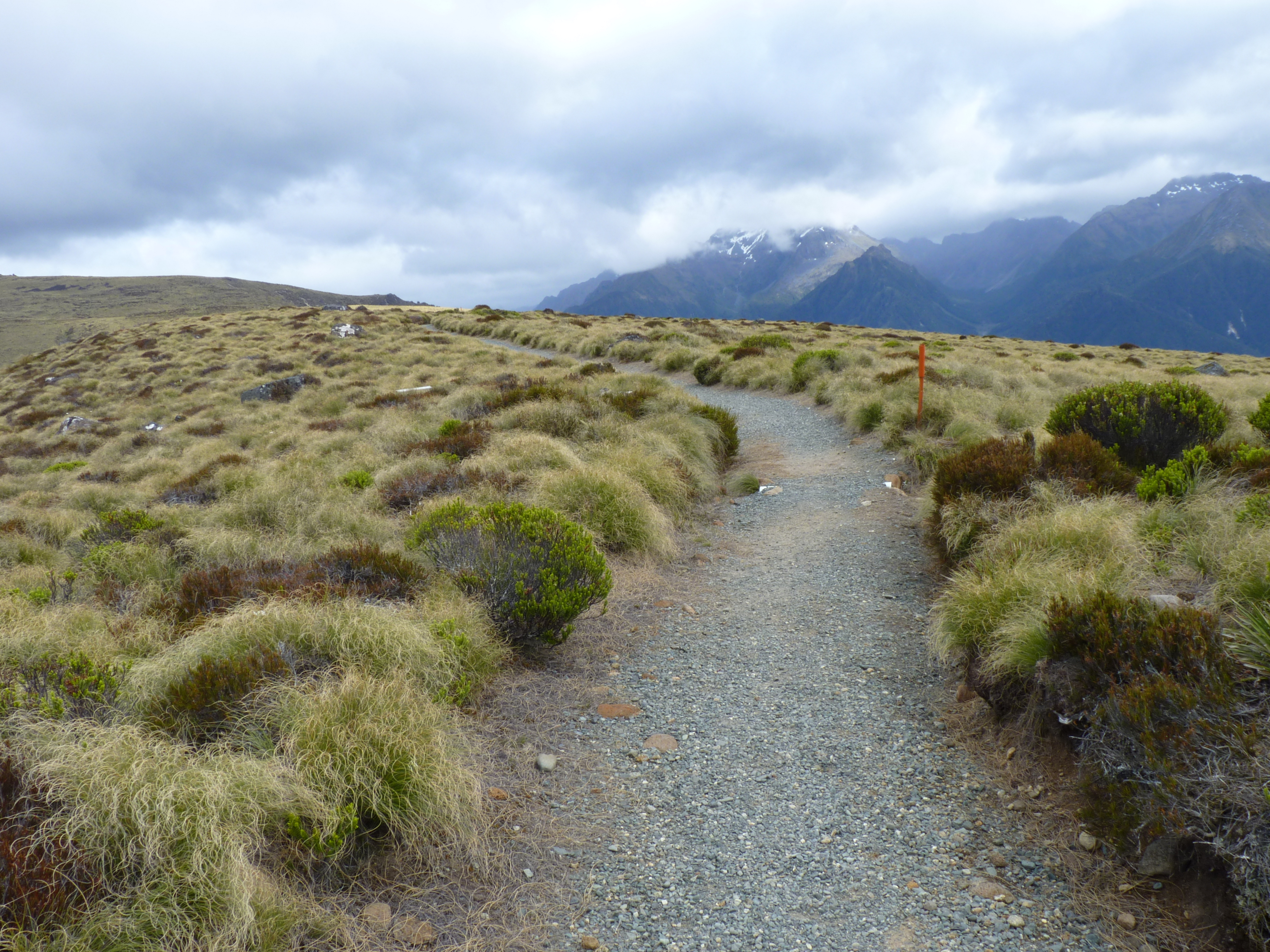
Tussock grasslands along the Kepler Track in the South Island of New Zealand

Tussock grassland is a form of open grassland that is dominated by tussock grasses (also called bunchgrasses). It is common in some temperate grasslands, savannas, and shrublands ecoregions of the Southern Hemisphere. Tussock grasslands are usually typified by low rainfall and poor soils in which few plants other than hardy tussock grasses can flourish. They are predominantly populated by tufted grasses of the genera Agrostis, Andropogon, Chionochloa, Deschampsia, Festuca, Koeleria, Pentameris and Poa. The grasslands are found in New Zealand, Australia, Argentina, temperate areas of southern and eastern Africa, and some subantarctic islands.

== See also ==
- Tussock Grassland (Tanzania)
- Tussock grasslands of New Zealand
