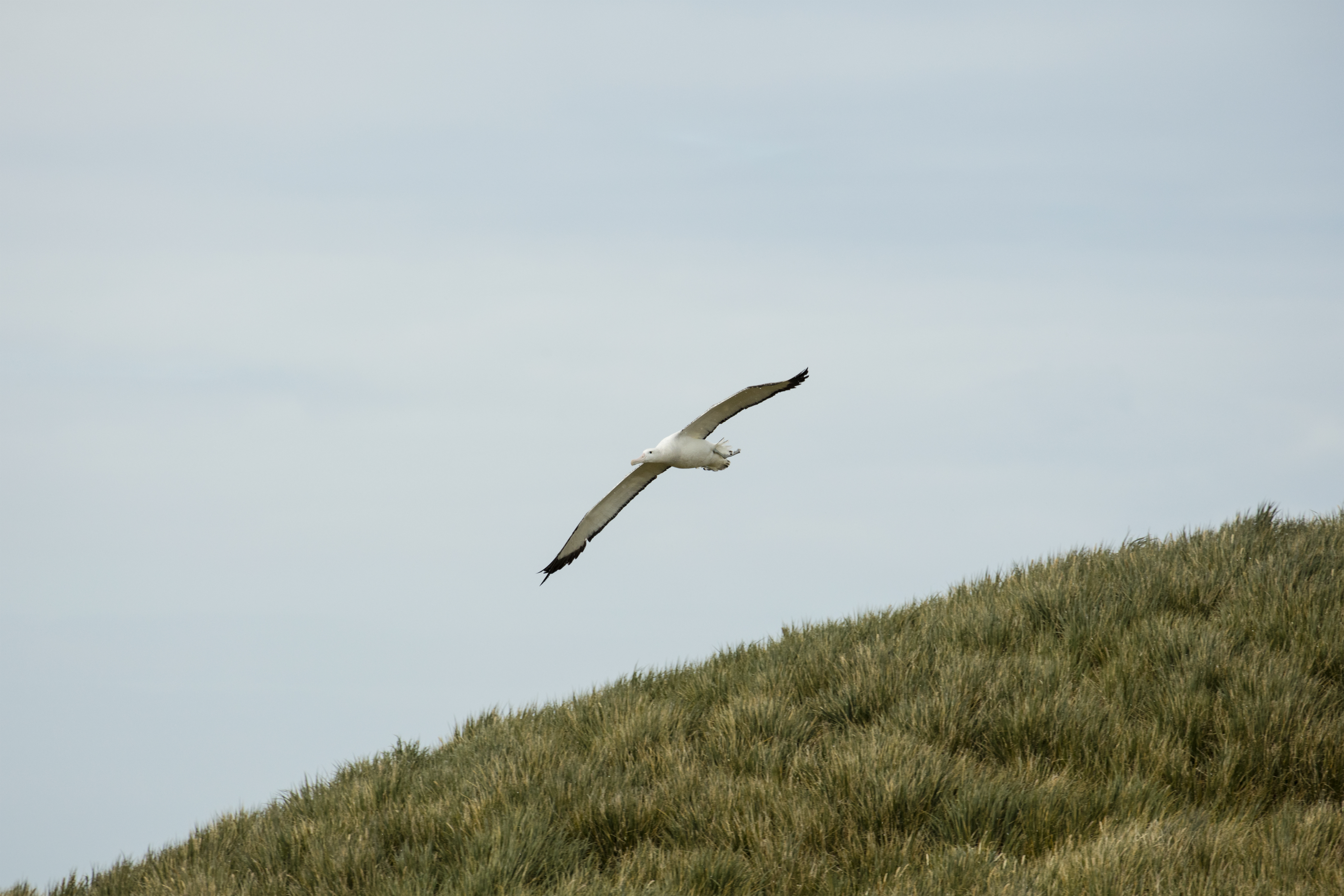
- Snowy albatross (Diomedea exulans)

Scientific classification
- Kingdom: Animalia
- Phylum: Chordata
- Class: Aves
- Order: Procellariiformes
- Family: Diomedeidae
- Genus: Diomedea; Linnaeus, 1758

Type species
- Diomedea exulans Linnaeus, 1758

= Great albatross =

Great albatross Temporal range: Early Pliocene to present

Genus of birds

The great albatrosses are seabirds in the genus Diomedea in the albatross family. The genus Diomedea formerly included all albatrosses except the sooty albatrosses, but in 1996 the genus was split, with the mollymawks and the North Pacific albatrosses both being elevated to separate genera.

The great albatrosses themselves form two species complexes, the wandering and Amsterdam albatrosses, and the royal albatrosses. The splitting of the great albatrosses into six or seven species has been accepted by most, though not all, authorities.

== Description ==
The snowy albatross and the southern royal albatross are the largest of the albatrosses and are among the largest of flying birds. They have the largest wingspans of any extant bird, being up to 3.5 m (11 ft) from tip to tip, although the average is a little over 3 m (9.8 ft). Large adult males of these two species may exceed 11 kg (24 lb) in weight, as heavy as a large swan.

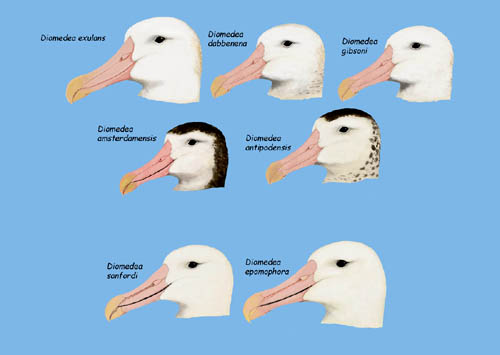
Facial features of various Diomedea species

The great albatrosses are predominantly white in plumage as adults, with birds becoming whiter as they age. The two royal albatrosses at all ages and the larger, older male snowy albatrosses are totally white-bodied, while adult females and younger animals of the other species have dark pencilling marks on the edges of their feathers. Generally the smaller species or subspecies and the juveniles have more dark brown colour. The recently discovered Amsterdam albatross retains the dark brown plumage of juvenile birds into adulthood.

== Habitat and range ==
The great albatrosses range across the Southern Ocean, and nest (for the most part) on isolated oceanic islands. The snowy albatrosses nest on islands around the Southern Ocean, from the Atlantic Ocean (South Georgia and Tristan da Cunha), to the Indian Ocean and New Zealand's Subantarctic islands. The royal albatrosses nest only on New Zealand's Subantarctic islands, with one unusual colony on New Zealand's Otago Peninsula.

== Taxonomy ==
The genus Diomedea was introduced in 1758 by the Swedish naturalist Carl Linnaeus in the tenth edition of his Systema Naturae. The genus name is from Greek mythology. When the hero Diomedes died his companions were turned into white seabirds. The type species was designated as the snowy albatross (Diomedea exulans) by George Robert Gray in 1840.

=== Species ===
The genus contains six species:

Genus Diomedea – Linnaeus, 1758 – six species
Common name	Scientific name and subspecies	Range	Size and ecology	IUCN status and estimated population
southern royal albatross	Diomedea epomophora Lesson, 1825	Campbell Island, Adams Island and Auckland Island in the Auckland Islands	Size: Habitat: Diet:	VU
northern royal albatross	Diomedea sanfordi Murphy, 1917	Chatham Islands (Forty-fours Island, Big Sister Island, and Little Sister Island), Enderby Island in the Auckland Islands	Size: Habitat: Diet:	EN
wandering albatross	Diomedea exulans Linnaeus, 1758	South Georgia Island, Crozet Islands, Kerguelen Islands, Prince Edward Islands, and Macquarie Island	Size: Habitat: Diet:	VU
Antipodean albatross	Diomedea antipodensis Robertson & Warham, 1992 Two subspecies: D. a. antipodensis; D. a. gibsoni	Auckland Islands, Antipodes Islands and Campbell Island	Size: Habitat: Diet:	EN
Tristan albatross	Diomedea dabbenena Mathews, 1929	Gough Island	Size: Habitat: Diet:	CR
Amsterdam albatross	Diomedea amsterdamensis (Roux, JP, Jouventin, Mougin, Stahl & Weimerskirch, 1983)	Amsterdam Island	Size: Habitat: Diet:	EN

== Fossils ==
The earliest known fossils of the genus are from the Middle Miocene, about 12–15 mya. By that time, the genera Phoebastria and Diomedea had already diverged.

Fossil species

- Diomedea milleri (Round Mountain Silt Middle Miocene of Sharktooth Hill and possibly Astoria Middle Miocene of Oregon, US)
- Diomedea sp. (Late Miocene of Valdez Peninsula, Antarctica)
- Diomedea sp. (Early Pliocene of South Africa)
- Diomedea sp. (Early Pliocene of Bone Valley, Florida, US)
- Diomedea thyridata Wilkinson, 1969 (Upper Miocene, Beaumaris Bay Fossil Site, Australia)

At least four species were found in the Early Pliocene deposits of Lee Creek Mine, North Carolina in the US. These may in part be identical with the forms mentioned above. Assignment of the undescribed taxa to Diomedea is tentative since most of them were discovered before the splitting of this genus. Especially the Southern Hemisphere species probably belong to other genera.

== See also ==
- List of albatross breeding locations
