= Marie Attard =

Australian conservation biologist and ecologist

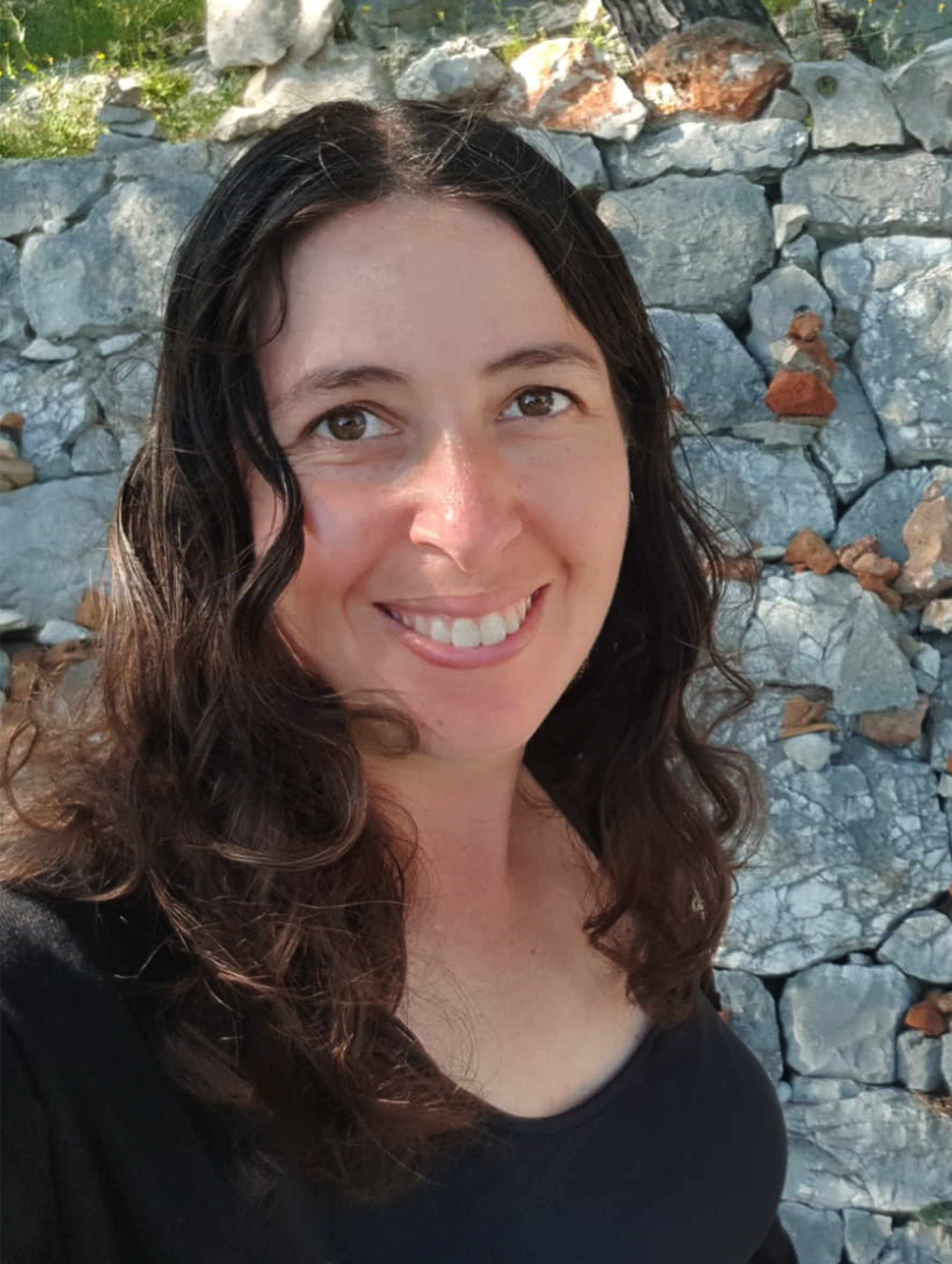
- Born: 1987 (age 38–39); Sydney, Australia
- Education: University of New South Wales, Macquarie University, Western Sydney University
- Scientific career
- Fields: Ecology; Conservation biology
- Workplaces: British Antarctic Survey
- Website: https://marieattard.com/

Marie Rosanna Gabrielle Attard (born 1987) is an Australian conservation biologist and ecologist. She is known for her research in biomechanics, evolutionary ecology, and the use of satellite remote sensing for wildlife monitoring. Her work spans extinct species such as the Tasmanian tiger (Thylacinus cynocephalus), neanderthal (Homo neanderthalensis), Haast's eagle (Hieraaetus moorei) and moa (Dinornithiformes), as well as eggshell evolution and seabird conservation.

Attard's research on guillemot eggs and their unique eggshell properties was featured in David Attenborough's Wonder of Eggs episode for the Natural World TV series in 2018. The episode was promoted by the Natural History Museum at Tring.

== Education ==
Attard was educated at Western Sydney University where she was awarded a BSc (Advanced Science) in Microbiology and Environmental Sciences in 2005, and Macquarie University where she did a MSc in Biological Sciences, conducting research on mate guarding behaviour of Australian sea lions (Neophoca cinerea).

She was awarded her PhD in 2013 from the University of New South Wales for her work using stable isotopes and biomechanics to reconstruct the diet of the extinct Tasmanian tiger (Thylacinus cynocephalus) and its close relatives. Stable isotope analysis of vibrissae was also used as a tool for temporal monitoring of wild Tasmanian devils (Sarcophilus harrisi).

== Career and Research ==
Following her PhD, Attard held postdoctoral research positions at the University of New England, University of Sheffield, Royal Holloway, University of London and the British Antarctic Survey. As of 2021, she is employed at the British Antarctic Survey as a Remote Sensing Data Analyst to monitor threatened and endangered seabird populations.

Her earlier research used 3D Finite Element Analysis of biological structures to assess prey size limits and foraging behaviour of extinct birds and mammals. The shape and mechanical performance of the Haast's eagles skull and talons suggest it hunted like an eagle, but fed like a vulture. Her research on skull biomechanics of extinct marsupials advanced understanding of the Tasmanian tiger's hunting behaviour, suggesting its jaw mechanics and bite force restricted it to smaller prey, thereby challenging traditional views.

Her research also explores avian eggshell evolution, with attention to eggshell conductance, shell thickness, egg shape and mimicry, membrane structure, and surface texture.

Attard leads the "Albatrosses from Space" Darwin Plus project (DPLUS132) at the British Antarctic Survey, launched in 2022 on the GeoHive platform. This citizen science project initiative uses Very High Resolution (VHR) satellite imagery to monitor wandering albatross (Diomedea exulans) colonies across South Georgia. The project aims to establish population baselines, detect distribution changes, and inform conservation policies on threats such as bycatch.

In 2022, she was awarded a Darwin Plus grant (DPLUS187) to develop satellite-based monitoring of South Georgia seabird populations, including albatrosses, mollymawks, shags, and burrowing petrels.
