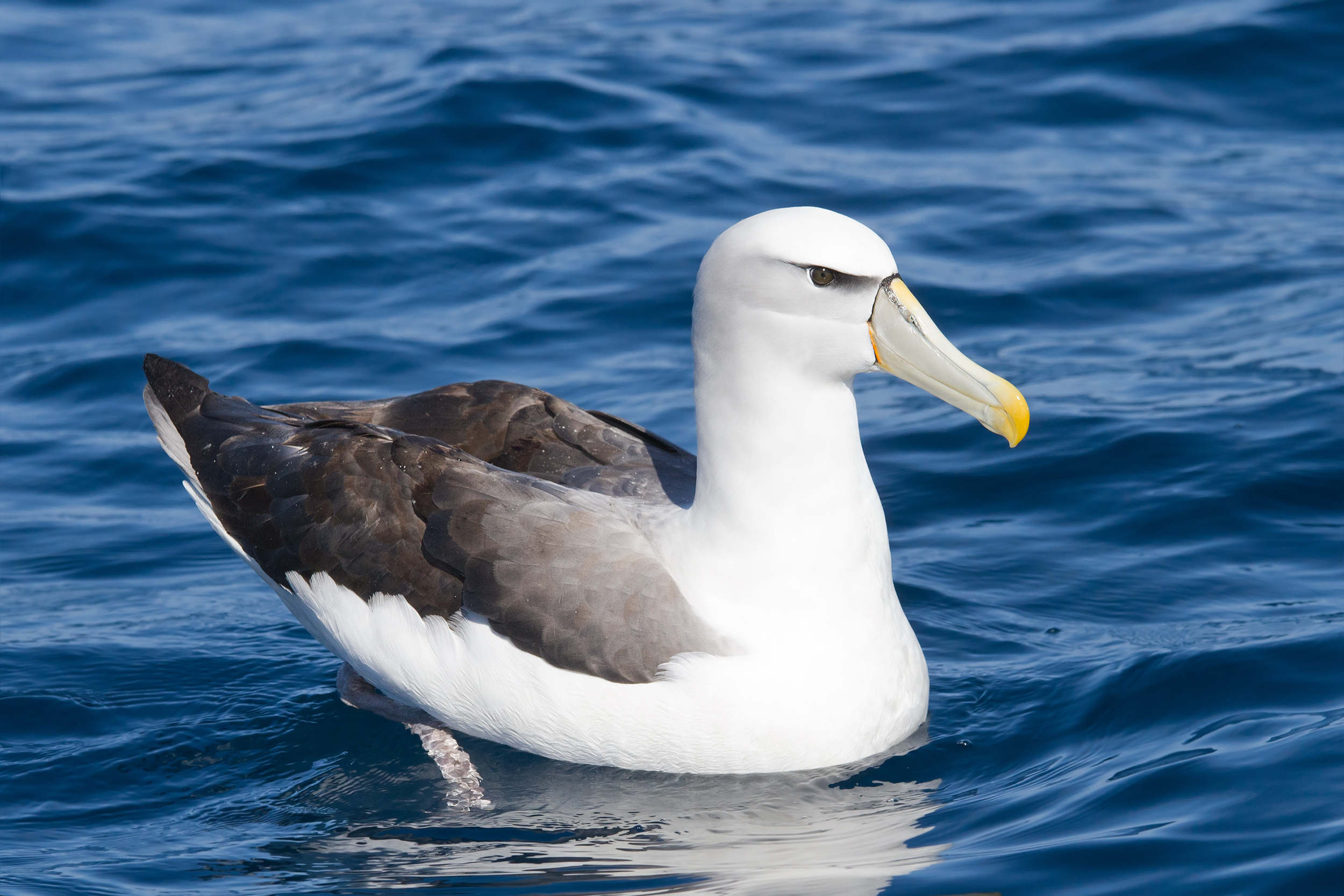
- Shy albatross (Thalassarche cauta)

Scientific classification
- Kingdom: Animalia
- Phylum: Chordata
- Class: Aves
- Order: Procellariiformes
- Family: Diomedeidae
- Genus: Thalassarche; Reichenbach, 1853

Type species
- Diomedea melanophris Temminck 1828

Species
- See text

Synonyms
- Diomedea (partim)

= Mollymawk =

Genus of birds

The mollymawks are a group of medium-sized albatrosses that form the genus Thalassarche. The name has sometimes been used for the genus Phoebetria as well, but these are usually called sooty albatrosses. They are restricted to the Southern Hemisphere, where they are the most common of the albatrosses. They were long considered to be in the same genus as the great albatrosses, Diomedea, but a study of their mitochondrial DNA showed that they are a monophyletic taxon related to the sooty albatrosses, and they were placed in their own genus.

== Taxonomy ==
The genus Thalassarche was introduced in 1853 by the German naturalist Ludwig Reichenbach with the black-browed albatross as the type species. The genus name combines the Ancient Greek thalassa meaning "sea" and arkhē meaning "power" or "command" (from arkhō, to govern).

The word mollymawk, which dates to the late 17th century, comes from the Dutch mallemok, which means mal – foolish and mok – gull. Another etymology suggests that it comes from the German Mallemugge, a term used originally for midges or flies that whirled about lights.

Mollymawks are a type of albatross that belong to the family Diomedeidae of the order Procellariiformes, along with shearwaters, fulmars, storm-petrels, and diving-petrels. They share certain identifying features. First, they have nasal passages that attach to the upper bill called naricorns, although the nostrils are on the sides of the bill. The bills of Procellariiformes are also unique in that they are split into between seven and nine horny plates. They also have a salt gland that is situated above the nasal passage and helps desalinate their bodies, due to the high amount of ocean water that they imbibe. It excretes a high saline solution from their nose. Finally, they produce a stomach oil made up of wax esters and triglycerides that is stored in the proventriculus. This can be sprayed out of their mouths as a defence against predators as well as an energy rich food source for chicks and for the adults during their long flights. The fossil species Thalassarche thyridata known from a skull fragment from the Late Miocene of Victoria, Australia shows that the genus had already diverged from the sooty albatrosses 10 mya.

=== Extant species ===
The genus contains nine species:

Genus Thalassarche – Reichenbach, 1853 – nine species
Common name	Scientific name and subspecies	Range	Size and ecology	IUCN status and estimated population
Atlantic yellow-nosed albatross	Thalassarche chlororhynchos (Gmelin, JF, 1789)	Mid-Atlantic, including Tristan da Cunha (Inaccessible Island, Middle Island, Nightingale Island, Stoltenhoff Island) and Gough Island.	Size: Average 81 cm (32 in) in length. Habitat: Diet:	EN
Indian yellow-nosed albatross	Thalassarche carteri (Rothschild, 1903)	Prince Edward Islands, the Crozet Islands, Kerguelen Island, Amsterdam Island (on the Falaises d'Entrecasteaux) and St Paul Islands in the Indian Ocean, from South Africa to the Pacific Ocean just beyond New Zealand	Size: 76 cm (30 in) in length. 2 m (6.6 ft) across the wings. Habitat: Diet:	EN
Buller's albatross	Thalassarche bulleri (Rothschild, 1893)	New Zealand	Size: 76 cm (31 in) in length. Habitat: Diet:	NT
Shy albatross	Thalassarche cauta (Gould, 1841)	Tasmania, Auckland Islands south of New Zealand	Size: 90 - 99 cm (35 - 39 in) in length. 220 - 256 (87 - 101 in) wingspan. Habitat: Diet:	NT
Chatham albatross	Thalassarche eremita Murphy, 1930	Chatham Islands	Size: 90 cm (35 in) in length. Habitat: Diet:	VU
Salvin's albatross	Thalassarche salvini (Rothschild, 1893)	Southern Ocean, Île des Pingouins in the Crozet Islands in the Indian Ocean	Size: 90 cm (36 in) in length. 2.56 m (8.4 ft) in wingspan. Habitat: Diet:	CR
Campbell albatross	Thalassarche impavida Mathews, 1912	South Island and the Chatham Rise to the Ross Sea.	Size: 88 cm (35 in) in length. Habitat: Diet:	VU
Grey-headed albatross	Thalassarche chrysostoma (Forster, 1785)	South Georgia in the South Atlantic, and smaller colonies on Islas Diego Ramírez, Kerguelen Islands, Crozet Islands, Marion Island, and Prince Edward Islands in the Indian Ocean, Campbell Island and Macquarie Island south of New Zealand, and Chile.	Size: 81 cm (32 in) in length. 2.2 m (7.2 ft) in wingspan. Habitat: Diet:	EN
Black-browed albatross	Thalassarche melanophris (Temminck, 1828)	Atlantic Ocean, it breeds on the Falkland Islands, South Georgia and the South Sandwich Islands, and the Cape Horn Islands.	Size: 80 - 95 cm (31 - 37 in) in length. 200 - 240 cm (79 - 94 in) in wingspan. Habitat: Diet:	EN

=== Fossils ===
- †Thalassarche thyridata

== Description ==
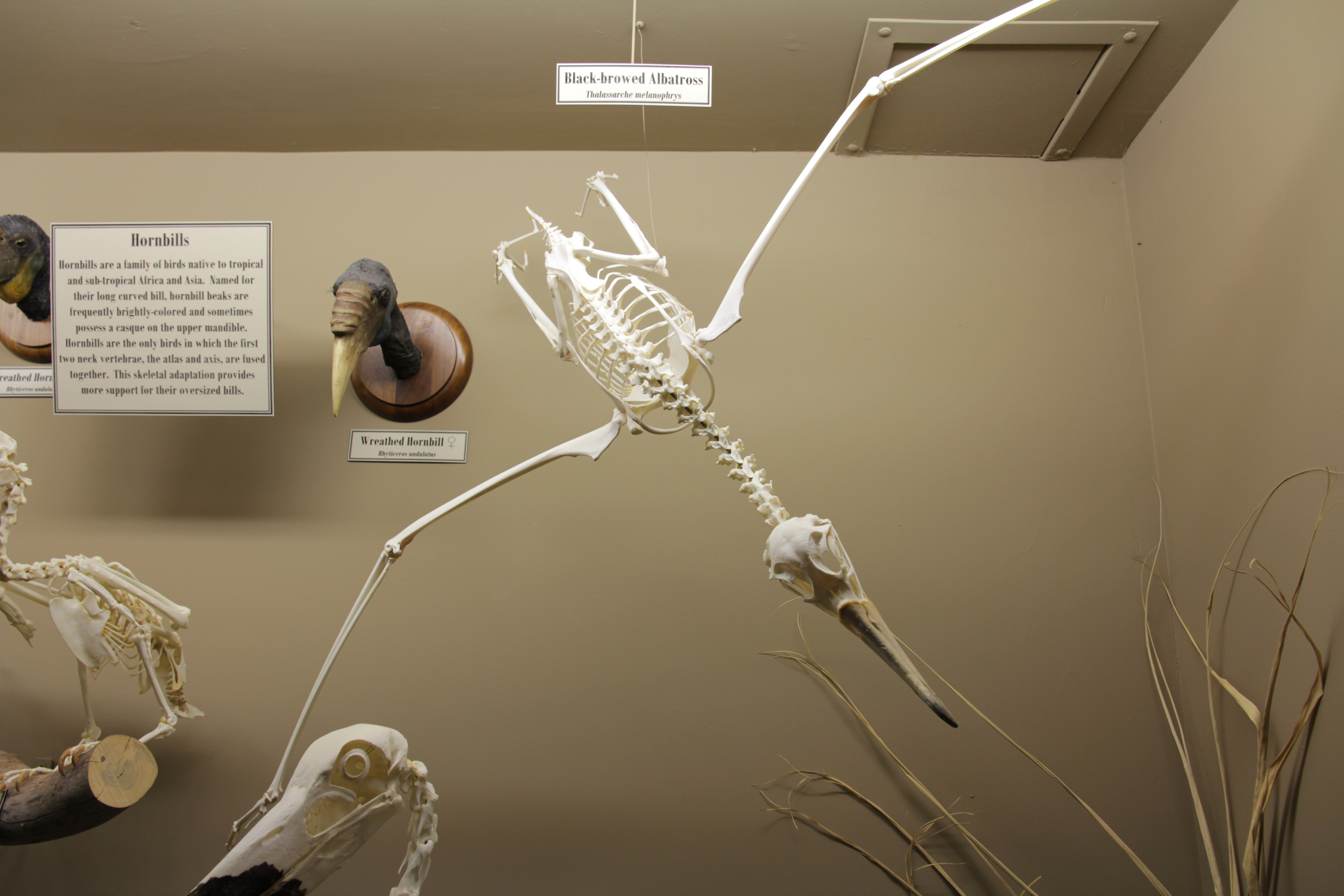
Black-browed albatross (Thalassarche melanophris) skeleton on display at the Museum of Osteology

Mollymawks have the largest range in size of all the albatross genera, as their wingspans are 180 to 256 cm (71–101 in). Mollymawks have what has been described as gull-like plumage, with dark black backs, mantle and tails and lighter heads, underwings and bellies. The heads of several species are often slightly darker grey, or have dark around the eyes. They all have a colourful pinkish flesh stripe from their gape to their ear that is shown during displays. They have distinctive bill structure and colouring which makes for easier identifying than other albatrosses. The bills of mollymawks are either brightly coloured orange or yellow, or dark with several bright yellow lines.

== See also ==
- List of albatross breeding locations
