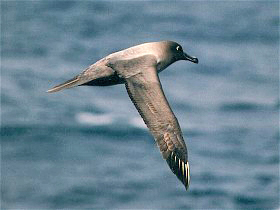
- Light-mantled albatross (Phoebetria palpebrata)

Scientific classification
- Kingdom: Animalia
- Phylum: Chordata
- Class: Aves
- Order: Procellariiformes
- Family: Diomedeidae
- Genus: Phoebetria; Reichenbach, 1853

Type species
- Diomedea fuliginosa Gmelin, 1789

Species
- Phoebetria fusca Sooty albatross Phoebetria palpebrata Light-mantled albatross

= Phoebetria =

Sooty albatross

Genus of birds

The sooty albatrosses are small albatrosses from the genus Phoebetria. There are two species, the sooty albatross, Phoebetria fusca, and the light-mantled albatross, Phoebetria palpebrata.

== Systematics ==
The sooties have long been considered distinct from the rest of the other albatrosses, and have retained their generic status through the many revisions of the family over the last 150 years. They have traditionally been thought of as primitive, sharing some morphological features with the other petrel families. However, molecular work examining the mitochondrial DNA has shown that the taxon is related to the mollymawks, and that the two taxa are distinct from the great albatrosses and the North Pacific albatrosses.

Genus Phoebetria – Reichenbach, 1853 – two species
Common name	Scientific name and subspecies	Range	Size and ecology	IUCN status and estimated population
sooty albatross, dark-mantled sooty albatross or dark-mantled albatross	Phoebetria fusca (Hilsenberg, 1822)	southern Atlantic Ocean (Gough Island and the Tristan da Cunha group) and Indian Ocean	Size: Habitat: Diet:	EN
light-mantled albatross, grey-mantled albatross or the light-mantled sooty albatross	Phoebetria palpebrata (Forster, 1785)	circumpolar pelagic distribution in the Southern Ocean	Size: Habitat: Diet:	NT

== Description ==
Both have distinctive blackish plumage over the head, wings and bellies. The sooty albatross has a dark back and mantle as well, whereas the light-mantled has an ashy-grey mantle, back and rump. The two species can also be told apart by the narrow yellow line on the sooty's bill. Despite the differences between the two species they can be hard to tell apart at sea, especially in poor light. Both species have a white incomplete eye-ring, dark bills and grey feet. They are among the smallest albatrosses, with wingspans of 200 cm (79 in) and are very narrow as well. The light-mantled, at 2.5 to 3.7 kg (5.5–8.2 lb) and sometimes to 4.6 kg (10 lb), is larger than the sooty, at 2.4 to 2.7 kg (5.3–6.0 lb). Unique amongst the albatrosses they have long stiff wedge shaped tails, the purpose of which is unclear but seems to be related to their ability to dive for food.

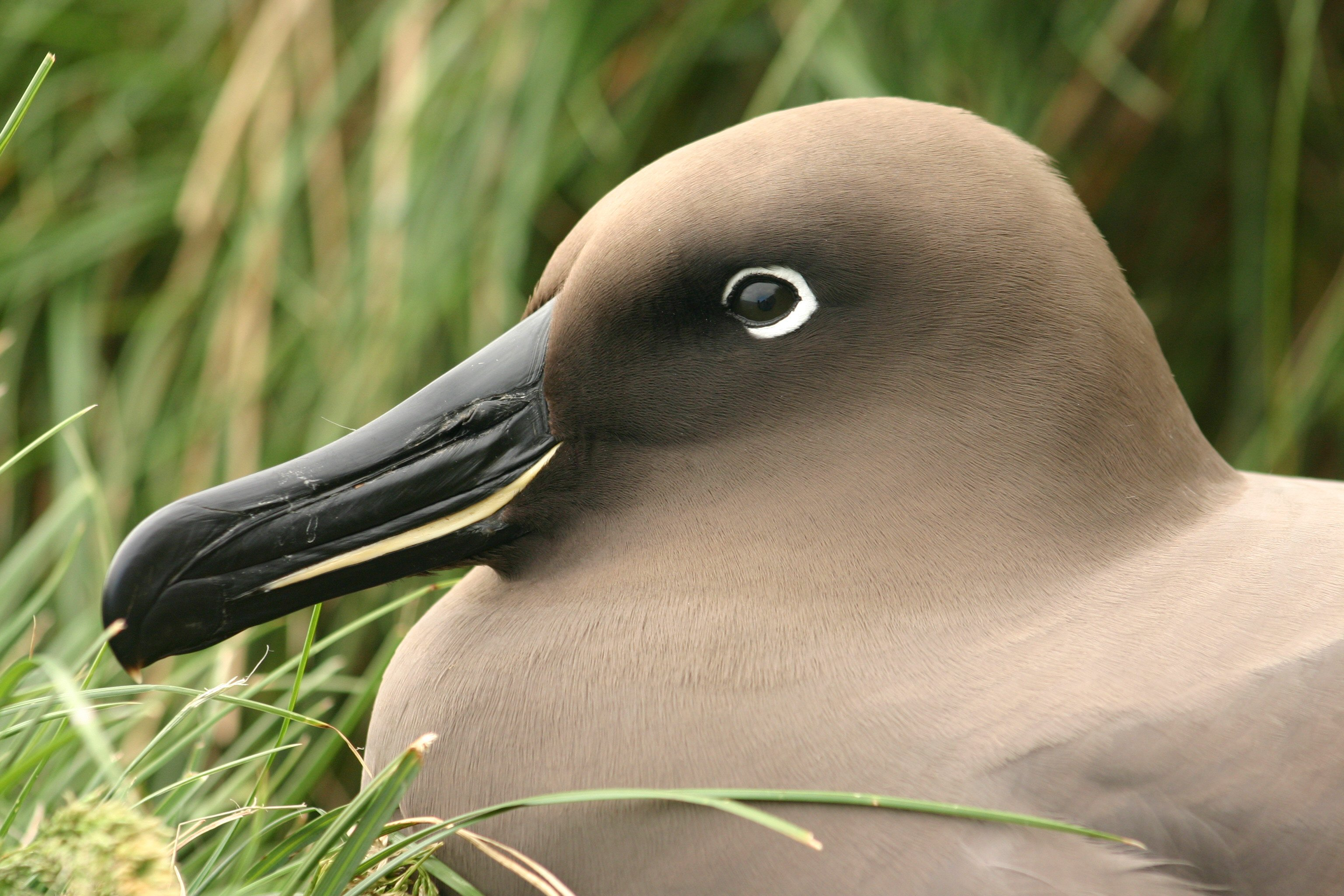
Light-mantled albatross, head detail

== Reproduction ==
The two species, like most seabirds, are colonial, although they are less colonial than the other species of albatrosses. In fact, on some breeding islands (like Tristan da Cunha) they may nest in very small groups or clusters of two to five nests, and the light-mantled will even nest singly. This is in part due to the influence of humans, and in part due to their tendency to nest on cliffs, unlike the flatter ground preferred by other albatrosses. Both species build cone shaped nests and lay a single egg. Eggs are incubated for 70 days, by both parents, the male taking the first stint after laying (lasting 11 days) thereafter both parents taking it in turns of 7 days. After hatching the chick is brooded for 20 days until it is able to thermoregulate on its own, after which both parents undertake the task of feeding it, on average bringing food to the chick every three days. The chick is fed for about 160 days, until it is able to fledge. There is no parental care after fledging. They are able to complete a breeding cycle in under a year, but do not breed in consecutive years, instead taking a year off and returning to breed every two years. Around 22% of the sooty albatrosses survive until adulthood (there are no figures for light-mantled). Both species return to the breeding colony after 7–10 years of fledging, and begin to breed a few years later.

== Range and habitat ==
Sooty albatrosses nest on islands in the South Atlantic (Tristan da Cunha and Gough Island) and islands in the South Indian Ocean (the Crozet Islands to Kerguelen Island). At sea they forage from South America to Australia, with a few records of birds reaching New Zealand. The light-mantled albatross has a wider distribution, nesting on South Georgia in the Atlantic, many of the same islands in the Indian Ocean, Macquarie Island and New Zealand's subantarctic islands. At sea it forages further south than the sooty to Antarctica, and around the Southern Ocean as far north as Chile, Tasmania and South Africa. At sea they often eat more fish as opposed to squid than other albatross species, and the sooties also readily take carrion and particularly other seabirds. They also are the deepest diving of the albatross, often diving to 5 m (16 ft) and once being recorded as deep as 12 m (39 ft).

== Conservation ==
The two species face similar threats, introduced species that attack chicks and eggs, and falling victim to longline fisheries. These threats, combined with some historic harvesting of the birds and chicks, has led to an estimated 75% population decline in the sooty albatross over the last 90 years (to around 40,000 birds), which has led to it being listed as an endangered species by the IUCN. The light-mantled albatross has not been as badly affected, and is considered near threatened.

== See also ==
- List of albatross breeding locations
