= Tydea =

Tydea Temporal range: Rupelian

Scientific classification
- Kingdom: Animalia
- Phylum: Chordata
- Class: Aves
- Order: Procellariiformes
- Family: Diomedeidae
- Genus: †Tydea
- Species: †T. septentrionalis

Binomial name
- †Tydea septentrionalis Mayr & Smith, 2012

Extinct genus of birds

Tydea is an extinct genus of diomedeid that lived during the Rupelian stage of the Oligocene epoch.

== Distribution ==
Tydea septentrionalis is known from Belgium.
