= List of albatross breeding locations =

The following is a list of locations where albatrosses breed, together with a list of the species found at each location.

== North Pacific Ocean ==
- Bonin Islands – black-footed, Laysan
- French Frigate Shoals – Laysan, black-footed
- Guadalupe Island (Mexico) – Laysan
- Hawaii – Laysan
- Izu Islands, Japan – short-tailed (Tori-shima only), black-footed
- Laysan Island – Laysan, black-footed
- Midway Island – Laysan, black-footed
- Southern Ryukyu Islands – black-footed

== South America ==
=== Islands off Ecuador ===
- Española Island (Hood Island), Galápagos – waved
- Isla de la Plata – waved

=== Subantarctic islands of South America ===
- Diego de Almagro Island, Chile – black-browed
- Diego Ramírez Islands – grey-headed
- Evangelistas Islets – black-browed
- Ildefonso Islands – grey-headed, black-browed
- Isla de los Estados, Argentina – black-browed

== South Atlantic Ocean ==
- Falkland Islands – black-browed
- South Georgia – wandering, black-browed, grey-headed, light-mantled

=== Tristan group ===
- Gough Island – Tristan, Atlantic yellow-nosed, sooty
- Inaccessible Island – Tristan, Atlantic yellow-nosed
- Nightingale Islands – Atlantic yellow-nosed
- Tristan da Cunha – Tristan (formerly), Atlantic yellow-nosed, sooty

== Indian Ocean ==
- Amsterdam Island – Amsterdam, Indian yellow-nosed, sooty
- Crozet Islands – wandering, Salvin's, black-browed, grey-headed, Indian yellow-nosed, sooty, light-mantled
- Heard and McDonald Islands – wandering, black-browed, light-mantled
- Kerguelen Islands – wandering, black-browed, grey-headed, Indian yellow-nosed, sooty, light-mantled; a single Salvin's has nested
- Marion Island – wandering, grey-headed, sooty, light-mantled
- Prince Edward Island – wandering, grey-headed, Indian yellow-nosed, sooty, light-mantled
- Saint Paul – Indian yellow-nosed, sooty

== New Zealand ==
=== South Island, North Island, and nearby islands ===
- Solander Island (offshore from the South Island) – Buller's (Pacific form)
- Taiaroa Head, on Otago Peninsula in the South Island – northern royal
- Three Kings Island (offshore from the North Island) – Buller's (nominate form)

=== Subantarctic islands of New Zealand ===
- Antipodes Islands – Antipodean (race antipodensis), shy (race steadi), black-browed, light-mantled
- Auckland Islands – Gibson's, southern royal (Enderby only), northern royal (Enderby only), shy (race steadi), light-mantled
- Bounty Islands – Salvin's
- Campbell Island – Antipodean (race antipodensis), southern royal, black-browed, Campbell, grey-headed, light-mantled, sooty
- Chatham Islands – northern royal, Chatham (Pyramid Rock only), Buller's (Pacific form), Indian yellow-nosed (shy, race steadi, has also bred here twice)
- Snares – Salvin's, black-browed, Buller's (nominate form); Chatham has also made a single unsuccessful breeding attempt here

== Tasmania ==
- Albatross Island – shy (race cauta)
- Mewstone – shy (race cauta)
- Pedra Branca – shy (race cauta)

=== Subantarctic islands of Tasmania ===
- Macquarie Island – wandering, black-browed, grey-headed, light-mantled
  - Bishop and Clerk Islets – black-browed
