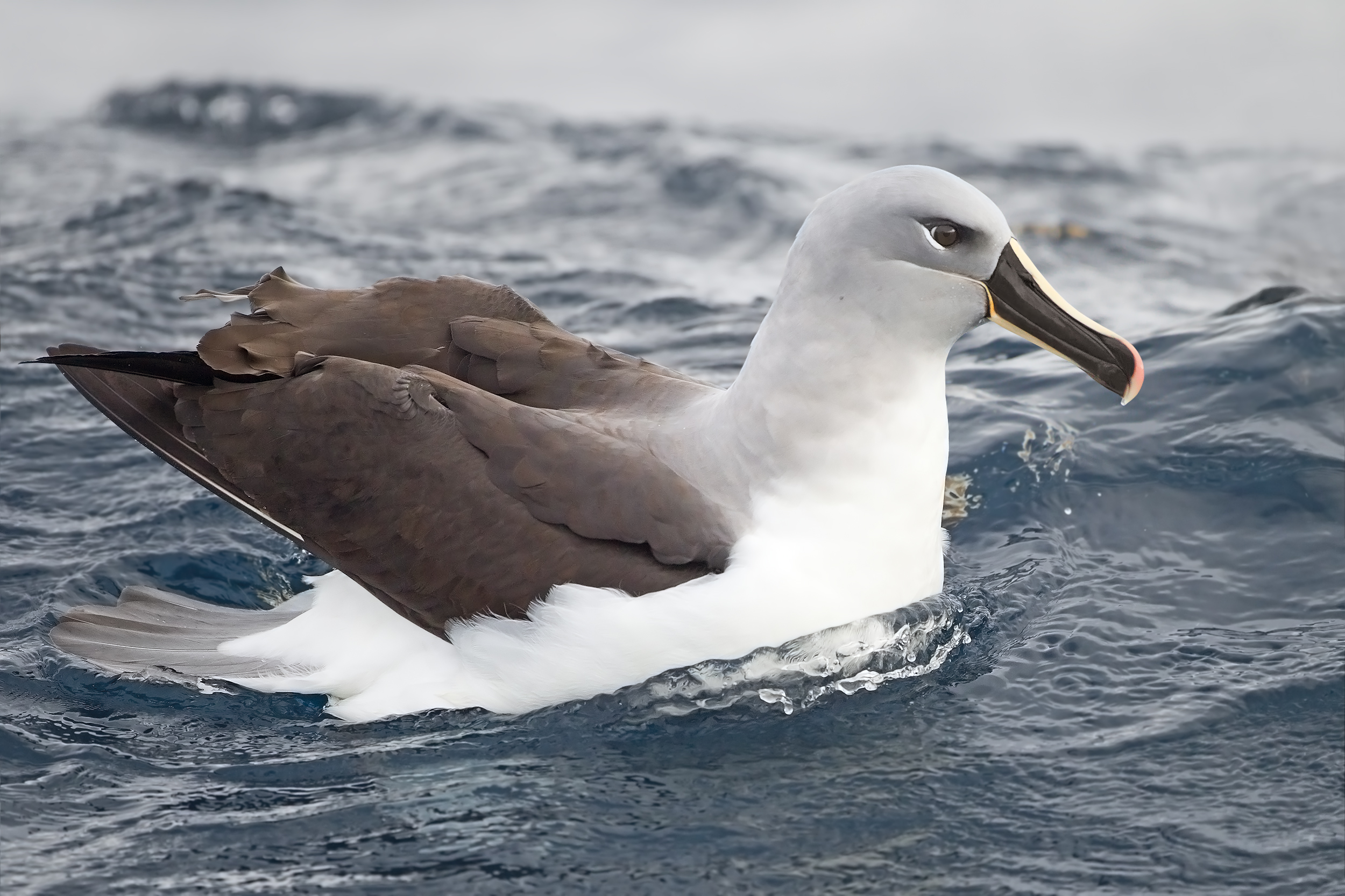

Conservation status
- Endangered (IUCN 3.1)

Scientific classification
- Kingdom: Animalia
- Phylum: Chordata
- Class: Aves
- Order: Procellariiformes
- Family: Diomedeidae
- Genus: Thalassarche
- Species: T. chrysostoma

Binomial name
- Thalassarche chrysostoma (Forster, 1785)

Synonyms
- Diomedea chrysostoma

= Grey-headed albatross =

Species of bird

The grey-headed albatross (Thalassarche chrysostoma) also known as the gray-headed mollymawk, is a large seabird from the albatross family. It has a circumpolar distribution, nesting on isolated islands in the Southern Ocean and feeding at high latitudes, further south than any of the other mollymawks. Its name derives from its ashy-gray head, throat and upper neck.

== Taxonomy ==
Mollymawks are a type of albatross that belong to the family Diomedeidae from the order Procellariiformes, along with shearwaters, fulmars, storm petrels, and diving petrels. They share certain identifying features. First, they have nasal passages that attach to the upper bill called naricorns, although the nostrils of an albatross are on the sides of the bill. The bills of Procellariiformes are also unique in that they are split into between seven and nine horny plates. Finally, they produce a stomach oil made up of wax esters and triglycerides that is stored in the proventriculus. This is used against predators as well as an energy rich food source for chicks and for the adults during their long flights. They also have a salt gland situated above the nasal passage that helps desalinate their bodies, to compensate for the ocean water they imbibe. It excretes a concentrated brine from the nostrils.

== Etymology ==
The name chrysostoma is derived from two Greek words. Khrusos means "gold" and stoma means "the mouth", in reference to its golden bill.

== Description ==
The grey-headed albatross averages 81 cm (32 in) in length and 2.2 m (7.2 ft) in wingspan. Weight can range from 2.8 to 4.4 kg (6.2 to 9.7 lb), with a mean mass of 3.65 kg (8.0 lb). It has a dark ashy-grey head, throat, and upper neck, and its upper wings, mantle, and tail, are almost black. It has a white rump, underparts, and a white crescent behind its eyes. Its bill is black, with bright yellow upper and lower ridges, that shades to pink-orange at the tip. Its underwings are white with a lot of black on the leading edge and less on the trailing edge. Juveniles have a black bill and head and a darker nape. Its eye crescent is indistinct and its underwing is almost completely dark.

== Range and habitat ==
Breeding population and trends
Location	Population	Date	Trend
South Georgia Island	48,000 pairs	2006	Declining
Marion Island	6,200 pairs	2003	Stable
Prince Edward Islands	3,000 pairs	2003	
Campbell Island	7,800 pair	2004	Declining
Macquarie Island	84 pairs	1998	
Crozet Islands	5,940 pairs	1998	
Kerguelen Islands	7,905 pairs	1998	
Islas Diego Ramirez	16,408 pairs	2002	
Total	250,000	2004	Decreasing

Grey-headed albatrosses nest in colonies on several islands in the Southern Ocean, with large colonies on South Georgia in the South Atlantic, and smaller colonies on Islas Diego Ramírez, Kerguelen Islands, Crozet Islands, Marion Island, and Prince Edward Islands in the Indian Ocean, Campbell Island and Macquarie Island south of New Zealand, and Chile. While breeding, they will forage for food within or south of the Antarctic Polar Frontal Zone. Birds that roost in the Marion Island area forage for food in the sub-tropical zone. Juveniles or non-breeding adults fly freely throughout all the southern oceans, north to 35°S.

== Behaviour ==
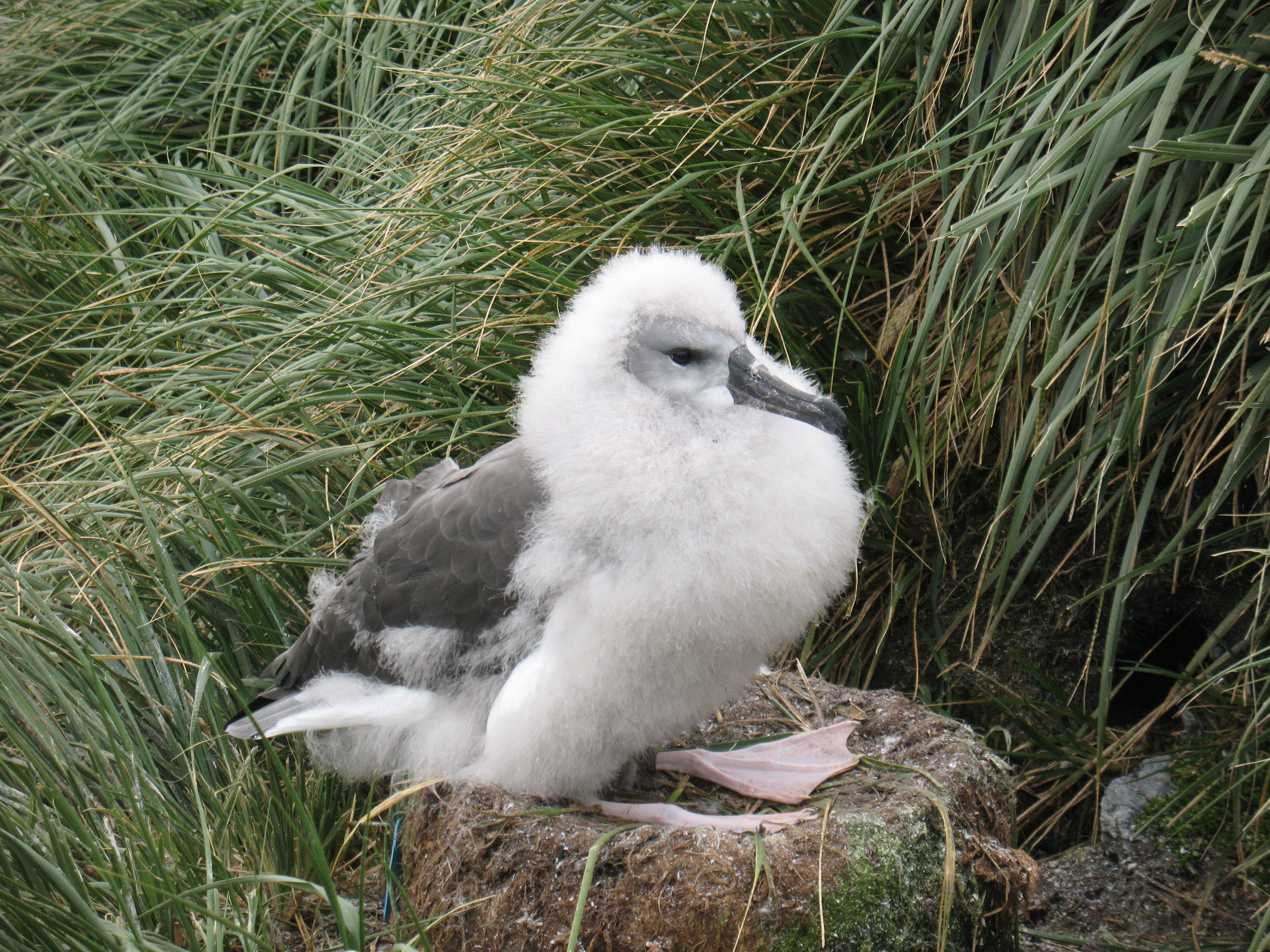
Chick at nest

=== Feeding ===
At sea the grey-headed albatross is highly pelagic, more so than other mollymawks, feeding in the open oceans rather than over the continental shelves. They feed predominantly on squid, taking also some fish, crustacea, carrion, cephalopods, and lampreys. Krill is less important as a food source for this species, reflecting their more pelagic feeding range. They are capable of diving as deep as 7 m (23 ft) to chase prey, but do not do so frequently.

=== Reproduction ===
A single egg is laid in a large nest, typically built on steep slopes or cliffs with tussock grass, and incubated for 72 days. Studies at South Georgia's Bird Island have shown that the growing chick is fed 616 g (21.7 oz) of food every 1.2 days, with the chick increasing in weight to around 4,900 g (170 oz). Chicks then tend to lose weight before fledging, which happens after 141 days. Chick will generally not return to the colony for 6–7 years after fledging, and will not breed for the first time until several years after that. If a pair has managed to successfully raise a chick it will not breed in the following year, taking the year off. During this time away from the colony, adults may travel enormous distances. Tracking of 22 non-breeding grey-headed albatrosses revealed three strategies: remaining within the breeding home range, migrating to a particular area of the south-west Indian Ocean, or making one or more complete circumnavigations of the globe; the fastest recorded circumnavigation took 46 days.

== Conservation ==
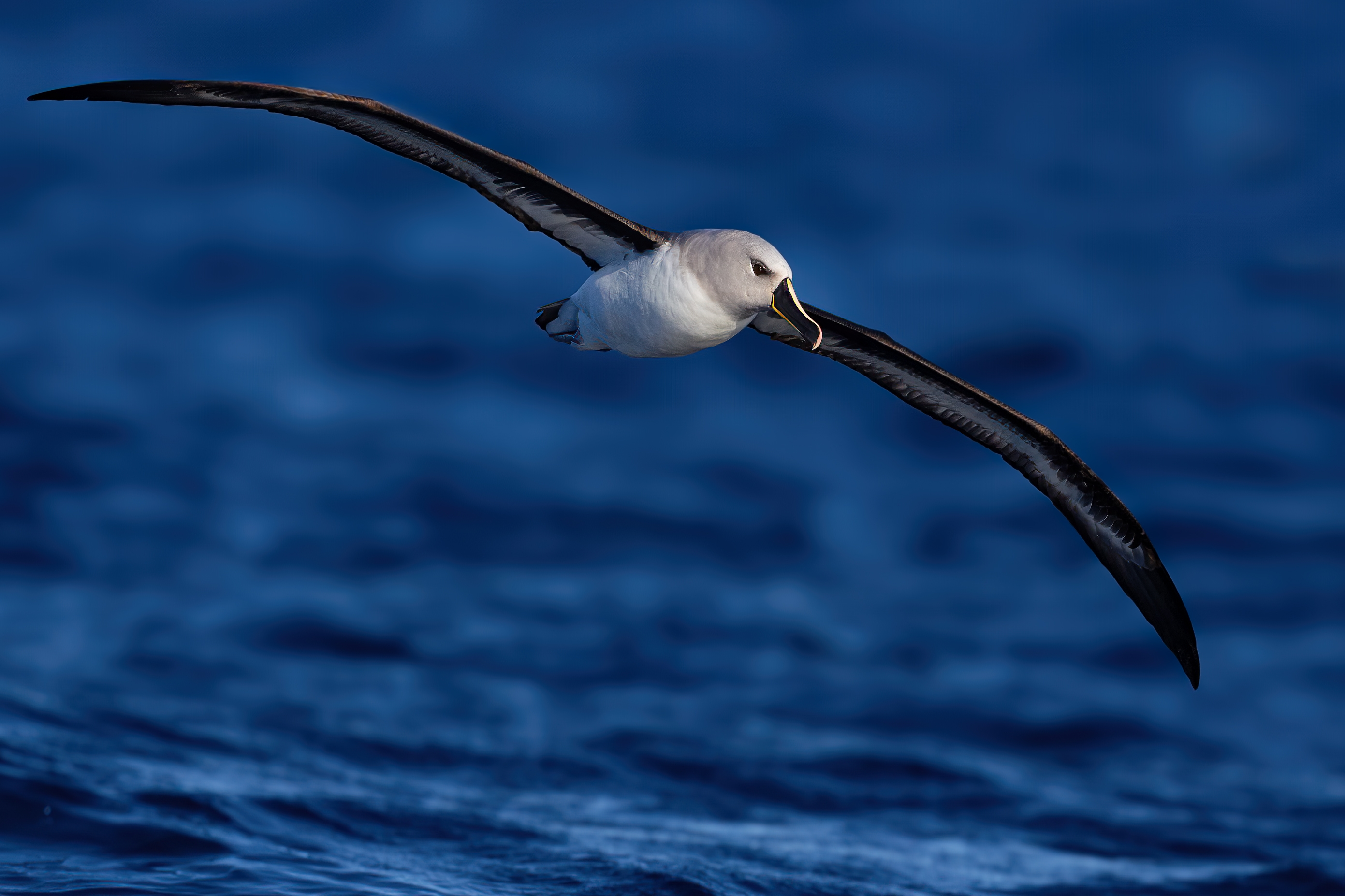
Flying near Tasmania, Southern Ocean

The IUCN classifies this bird as endangered due to rapidly declining numbers in South Georgia which holds around half the world's population. It has an occurrence range of 79,000,000 km^{2} (31,000,000 sq mi) and a breeding range of 1,800 km^{2} (690 sq mi), with a population, estimated in 2004, of 250,000. Estimates place 48,000 pairs at South Georgia Island, 6,200 on Marion Island, 3,000 pairs on Prince Edward Islands, 7,800 pairs on Campbell Island, 16,408 pairs in Chile, 84 pairs on Macquarie Island, 5,940 on Crozet Island, and 7,905 on Kerguelen Islands

Populations have been shrinking based on different studies. Bird Island numbers have been reduced 20% to 30% in the last 30 years. Marion Island registered 1.75% reduction per year until 1992 and now appears to be stable. Campbell Island has seen reduction of 79% to 87% since the 1940s. Overall, the trends looks like a 30-40% reduction over 90 years (3 generations). Illegal or unregulated fishing in the Indian Ocean for the Patagonian toothfish, Dissostichus eleginoides resulted in 10–20,000 dead albatrosses, mainly this species, in 1997 and 1998. Longline fishing is responsible for other deaths.

To assist this species, studies are being undertaken at most of the islands. Also, Prince Edward Islands is a special nature preserve, and Campbell Island and Macquarie Island are World Heritage Sites.
