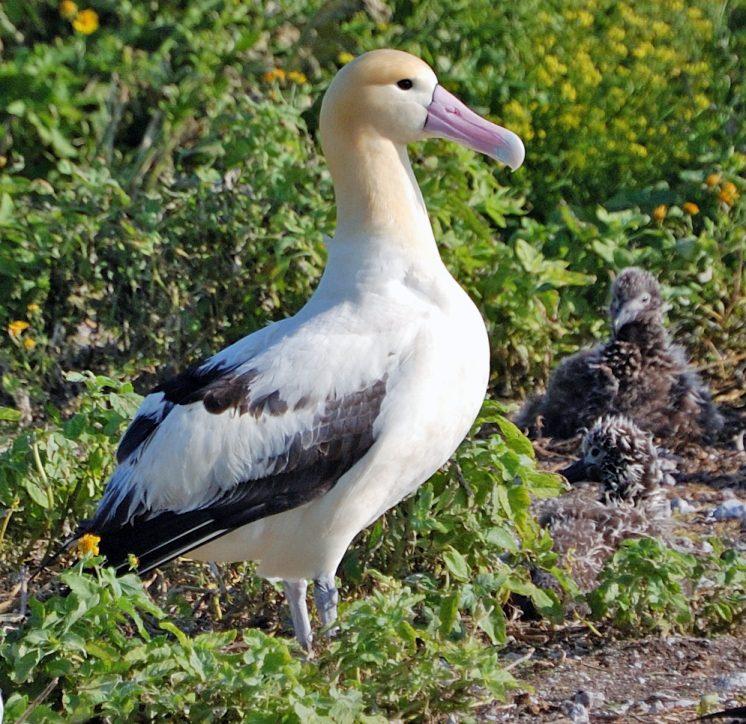
- Short-tailed albatross (Phoebastria albatrus) Captured at Midway Atoll

Scientific classification
- Kingdom: Animalia
- Phylum: Chordata
- Class: Aves
- Order: Procellariiformes
- Family: Diomedeidae; G.R. Gray 1840

Genera
- Diomedea; Thalassarche; Phoebastria; Phoebetria †Tydea †Plotornis †Diomedavus †Aldiomedes
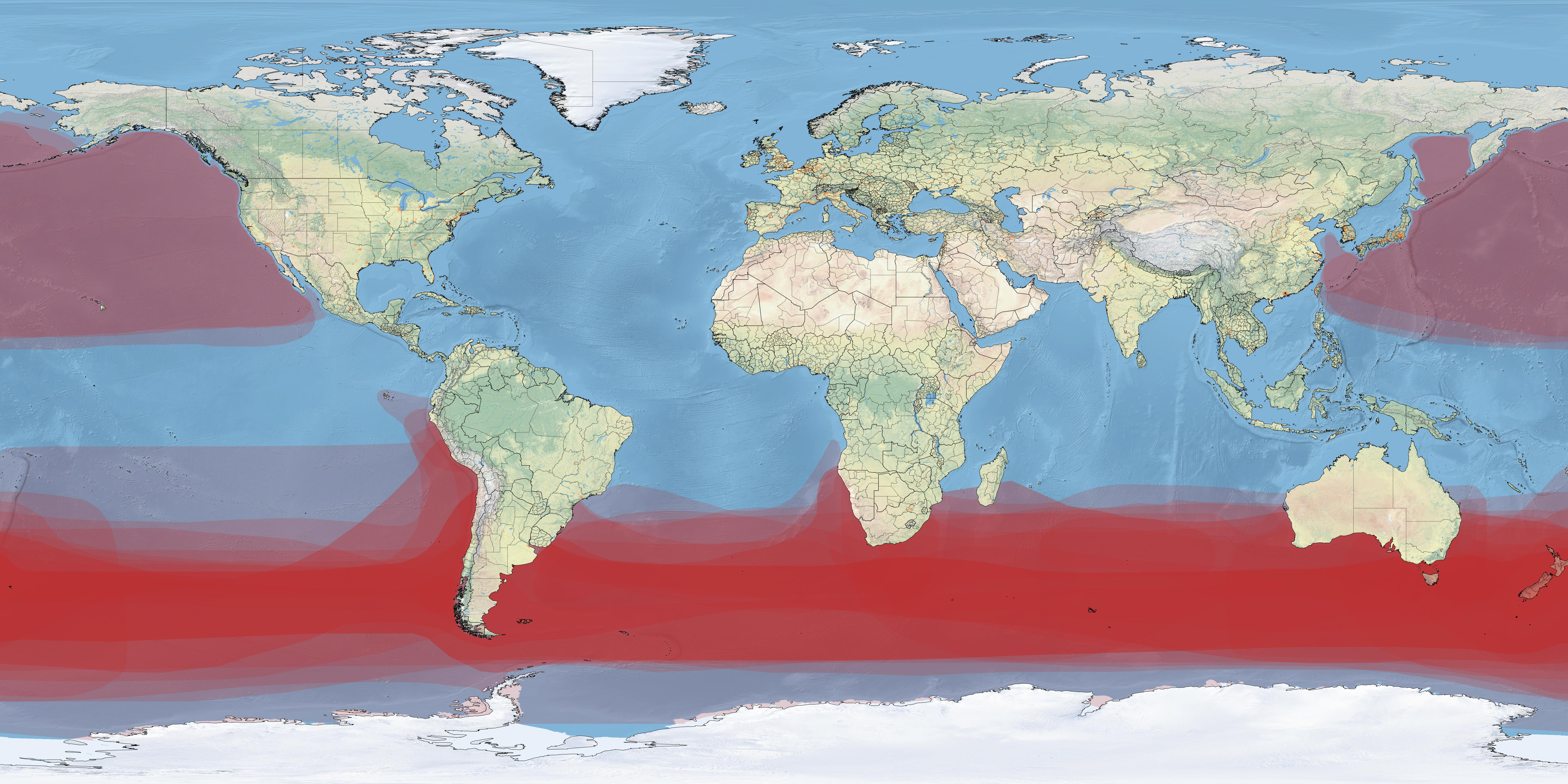
- Global range density (in red)

= Albatross =

Albatross Temporal range: Oligocene–recent

Family of large seabirds

Albatrosses, of the biological family Diomedeidae, are large seabirds related to the procellariids, storm petrels, and diving petrels in the order Procellariiformes (the tubenoses). They are found mostly in the Southern Ocean and the North Pacific. They are absent from the North Atlantic, although fossil remains of short-tailed albatross show they lived there up to the Pleistocene.Occcasional vagrants are found. Generally, the group depends on cold water currents for their foraging and nesting grounds. The geographically outlying genus Phoebastria which includes 3 North Pacific species and an equatorial (Galapagos) species exploits the California, Alaska, Oyashio and Humboldt currents, nesting on major oceanic islands near those currents.

Great albatrosses are among the largest of flying birds, with wingspans reaching up to 2.5–3.5 metres (8.2–11.5 ft) and bodies over 1 metre (3.3 ft) in length. The albatrosses are usually regarded as falling into four genera, but disagreement exists over the number of species.

Albatrosses are highly efficient in the air, using dynamic soaring and slope soaring to cover great distances with little exertion. They feed on squid, fish, and krill by either scavenging, surface seizing, or diving. Albatrosses are colonial, nesting for the most part on remote oceanic islands, often with several species nesting together. Pair bonds between males and females form over several years, with the use of "ritualised dances", and last for the life of the pair. A breeding season can take over a year from laying to fledging, with a single egg laid in each breeding attempt. A Laysan albatross named Wisdom on Midway Island is the oldest-known wild bird in the world. She was first banded in 1956 by Chandler Robbins.

Of the 22 species of albatrosses recognised by the IUCN, 21 are listed as at some level of concern. Two species are Critically Endangered, seven species are Endangered, six species are Vulnerable, and six species are Near Threatened. Populations have declined in the past due to harvesting for feathers. Albatrosses are threatened by introduced species, such as rats and feral cats that attack eggs, chicks, and nesting adults; by pollution; by a serious decline in fish stocks in many regions largely due to overfishing; and by longline fishing. Longline fisheries pose the greatest threat, as birds are attracted to the bait, become hooked on the lines, and drown. Stakeholders such as governments, conservation organisations, and people in the fishing industry are all working toward reducing this phenomenon.

== Etymology ==
The name "Albatross" is derived from the Arabic al-qādūs القادوس or al-ḡaṭṭās الغطاس (a pelican; literally, "the diver"), which travelled to English via the Portuguese form Alcatraz القطرس ("gannet"), which is also the origin of the name of the former prison Alcatraz. The Oxford English Dictionary notes that the word Alcatraz was originally applied to the frigatebird; the modification to albatross was perhaps influenced by Latin Albus, meaning "white", in contrast to frigatebirds, which are black. They were once commonly known as goonie birds or gooney birds, particularly those of the North Pacific. In the Southern Hemisphere, the name mollymawk is still well established in some areas, which is a corrupted form of malle-mugge, an old Dutch name for the northern fulmar. The name Diomedea, assigned to the albatrosses by Linnaeus, references the mythical metamorphosis of the companions of the Greek warrior Diomedes into birds. Finally, the name for the order, Procellariiformes, comes from the Latin word procella meaning "a violent wind" or "a storm".

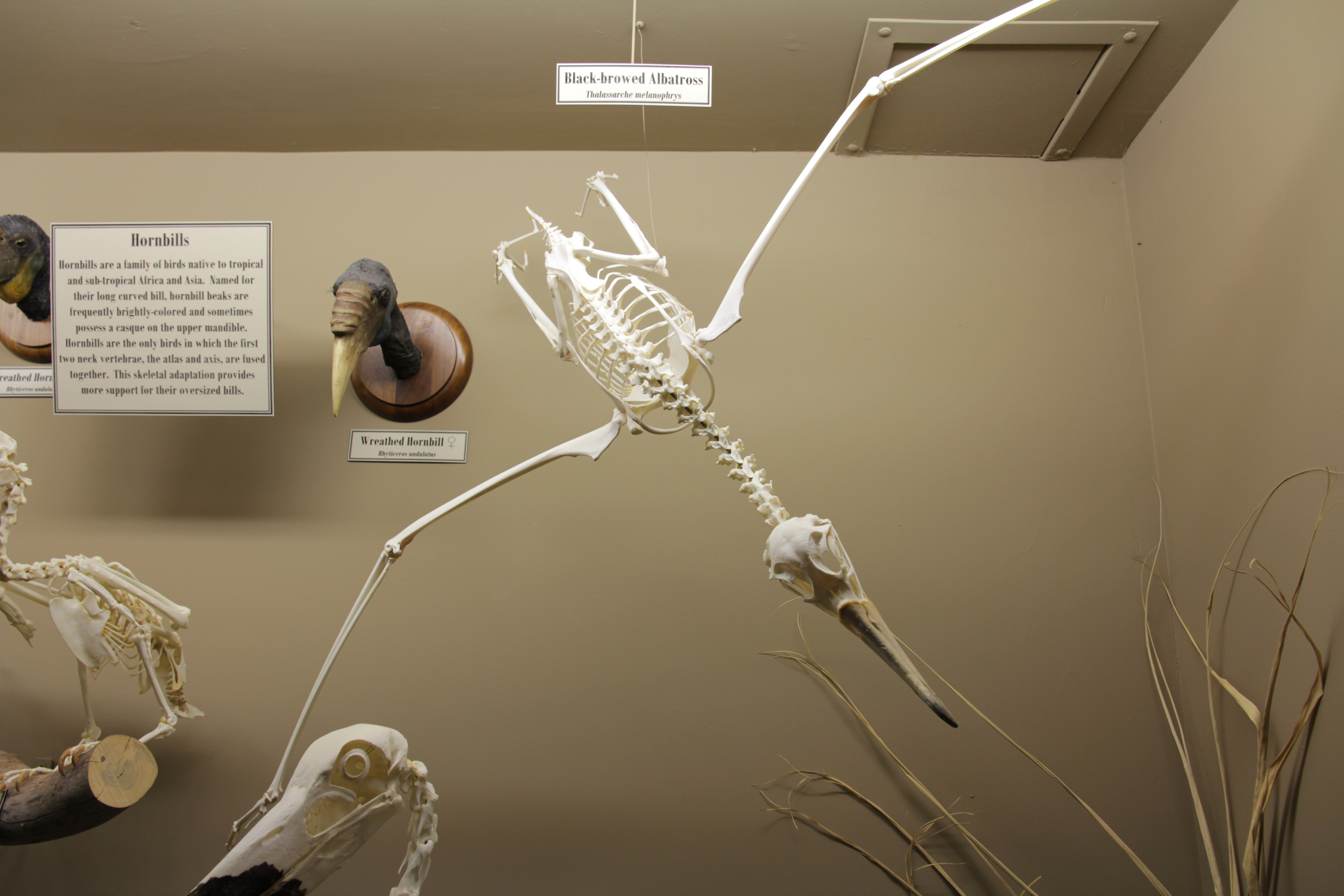
Skeleton of a black-browed albatross on display at the Museum of Osteology in Oklahoma City, Oklahoma, U.S.

== Taxonomy and evolution ==
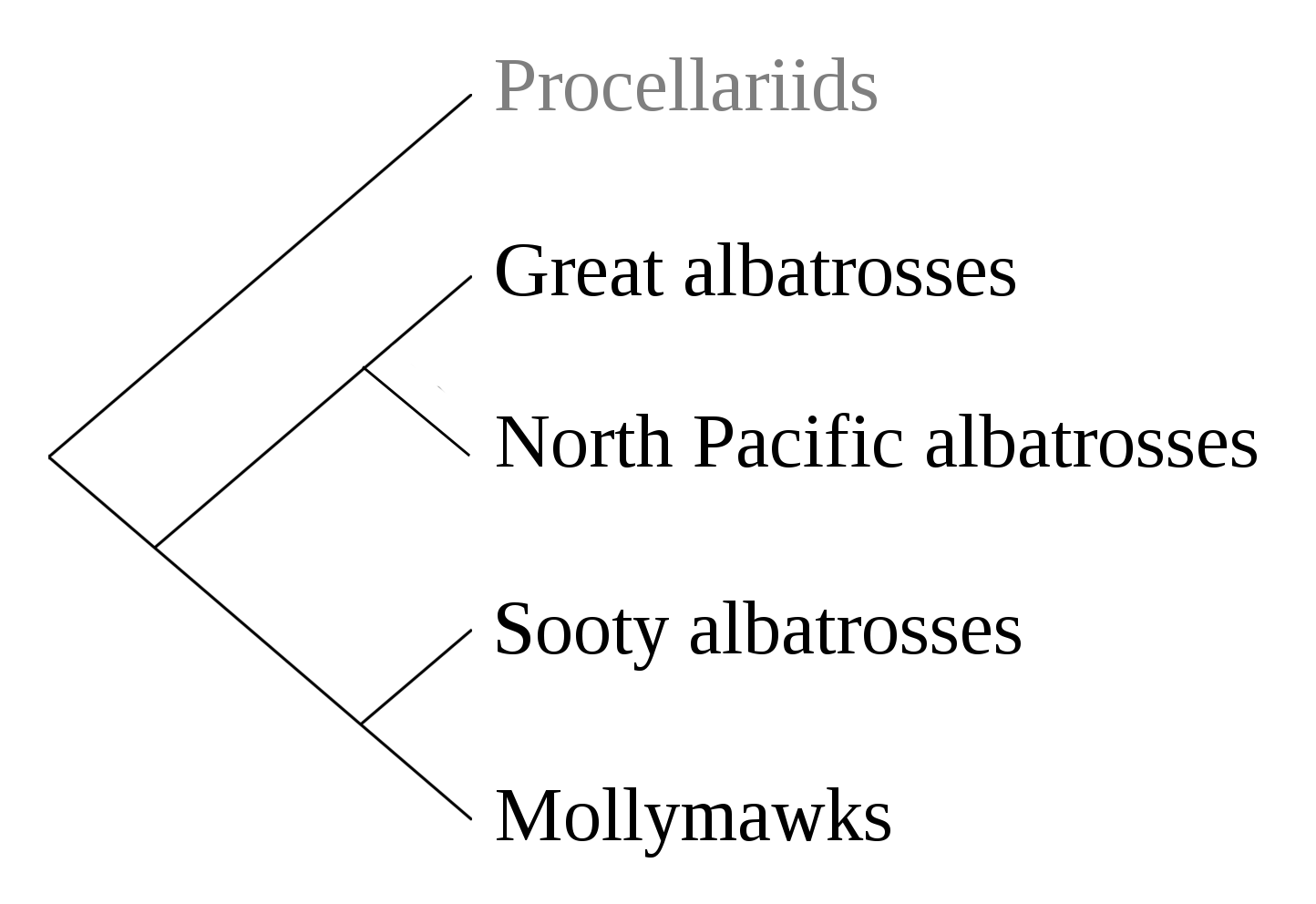
Phylogenetic relationships of the albatross genera, based on Nunn et al., 1996

The "albatross" designation comprises between 13 and 24 species (the number is still a matter of some debate, with 21 being the most commonly accepted number) in four genera. These genera are the great albatrosses (Diomedea), the mollymawks (Thalassarche), the North Pacific albatrosses (Phoebastria), and the sooty albatrosses or sooties (Phoebetria). The North Pacific albatrosses are considered to be a sister taxon to the great albatrosses, while the sooty albatrosses are considered closer to the mollymawks.

The taxonomy of the albatross group has been a source of much debate. The Sibley-Ahlquist taxonomy places seabirds, birds of prey, and many others in a greatly enlarged order, the Ciconiiformes, whereas the ornithological organisations in North America, Europe, South Africa, Australia, and New Zealand retain the more traditional order Procellariiformes. The albatrosses can be separated from the other Procellariiformes both genetically and through morphological characteristics, size, their legs, and the arrangement of their nasal tubes (see below: Morphology and flight).

Within the family, the assignment of genera has been debated for over 100 years. Originally placed into a single genus, Diomedea, they were rearranged by Reichenbach into four different genera in 1852, then lumped back together and split apart again several times, acquiring 12 different genus names in total (though never more than eight at one time) by 1965 (Diomedea, Phoebastria, Thalassarche, Phoebetria, Thalassageron, Diomedella, Nealbatrus, Rhothonia, Julietata, Galapagornis, Laysanornis, and Penthirenia).

By 1965, in an attempt to bring some order back to the classification of albatrosses, they were lumped into two genera, Phoebetria (the sooty albatrosses, which most closely seemed to resemble the procellarids and were at the time considered "primitive" ) and Diomedea (the rest). Though a case was made for the simplification of the family (particularly the nomenclature), the classification was based on the morphological analysis by Elliott Coues in 1866, and paid little attention to more recent studies and even ignored some of Coues's suggestions.

Research by Gary Nunn of the American Museum of Natural History (1996) and other researchers around the world studied the mitochondrial DNA of all 14 accepted species, finding four, not two, monophyletic groups within the albatrosses. They proposed the resurrection of two of the old genus names, Phoebastria for the North Pacific albatrosses and Thalassarche for the mollymawks, with the great albatrosses retaining Diomedea and the sooty albatrosses staying in Phoebetria.

While some agree on the number of genera, fewer agree on the number of species. Historically, up to 80 different taxa have been described by different researchers; most of these were incorrectly identified juvenile birds.

Based on the work on albatross genera, Robertson and Nunn went on in 1998 to propose a revised taxonomy with 24 different species, compared to the 14 then accepted. This expanded taxonomy elevated many established subspecies to full species, but was criticised for not using, in every case, peer reviewed information to justify the splits. Since then, further studies have in some instances supported or disproved the splits; a 2004 paper analysing the mitochondrial DNA and microsatellites agreed with the conclusion that the Antipodean albatross and the Tristan albatross were distinct from the wandering albatross, per Robertson and Nunn, but found that the suggested Gibson's albatross, Diomedea gibsoni, was not distinct from the Antipodean albatross. For the most part, an interim taxonomy of 21 species is accepted by ITIS and many other researchers, though by no means all—in 2004 Penhallurick and Wink called for the number of species to be reduced to 13 (including the lumping of the Amsterdam albatross with the wandering albatross), although this paper was itself controversial.

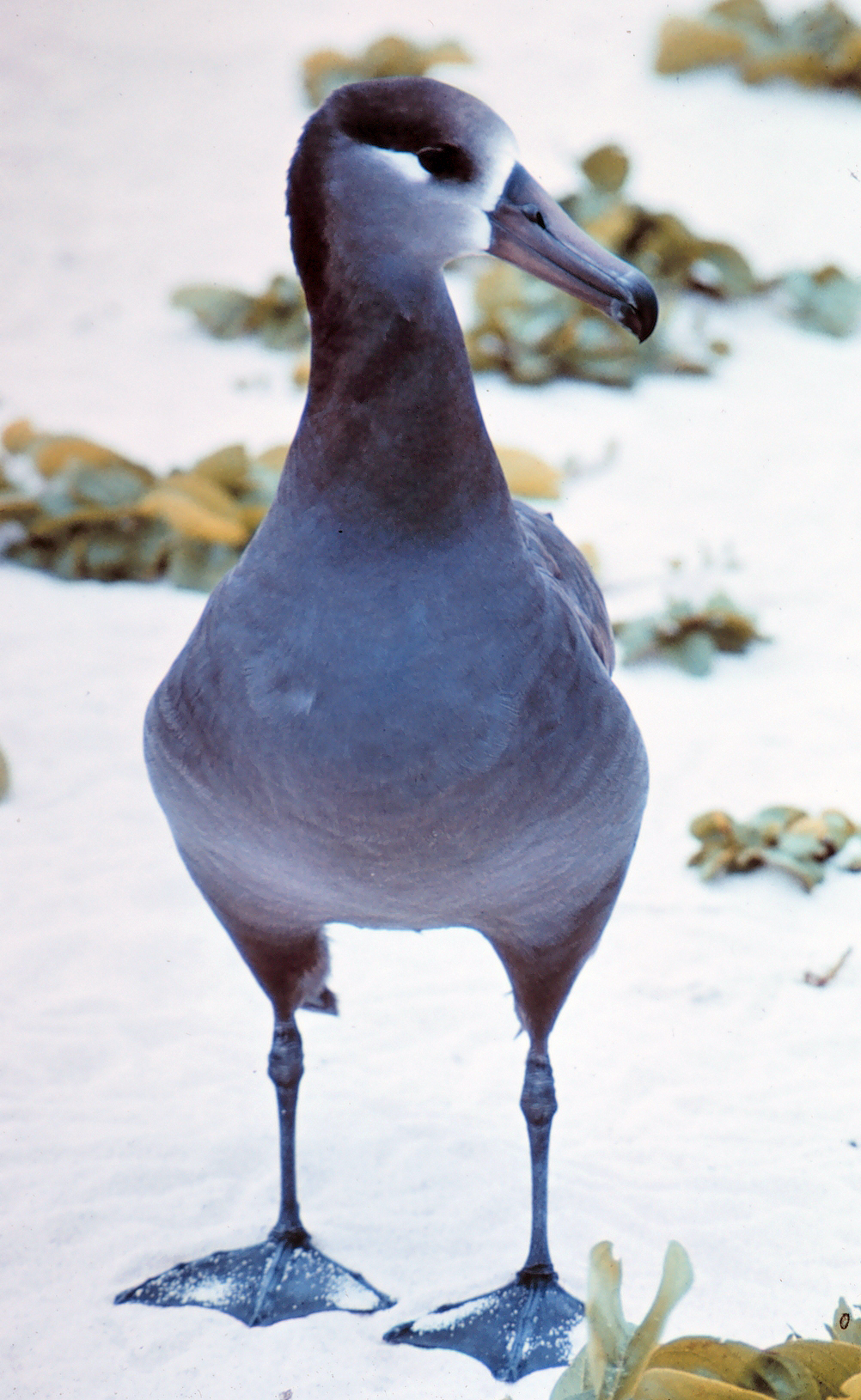
Unlike most Procellariiformes, albatrosses, like this black-footed albatross, can walk well on land.

Sibley and Ahlquist's molecular study of the evolution of the bird families has put the radiation of the Procellariiformes in the Oligocene period 35–30 million years ago (Mya), though this group probably originated earlier, with a fossil sometimes attributed to the order, a seabird known as Tytthostonyx, being found in late Cretaceous rocks (70 Mya). The molecular evidence suggests that the storm petrels were the first to diverge from the ancestral stock, and the albatrosses next, with the procellarids and diving petrels separating later. The earliest fossil albatrosses were found in Eocene to Oligocene rocks, although some of these are only tentatively assigned to the family and none appear to be particularly close to the living forms. They are Murunkus (Middle Eocene of Uzbekistan), Manu (early Oligocene of New Zealand), and an undescribed form from the Late Oligocene of South Carolina. The oldest widely accepted fossil albatross is Tydea septentrionalis from the early Oligocene of Belgium. Diomedavus knapptonensis is smaller than all extant albatrosses and was found in late Oligocene strata of Washington State, U.S. Plotornis was formerly often considered a petrel but is now accepted as an albatross. It is from the Middle Miocene of France, a time when the split between the four modern genera was already underway as evidenced by Phoebastria californica and Diomedea milleri, both being mid-Miocene species from Sharktooth Hill, California. These show that the split between the great albatrosses and the North Pacific albatrosses occurred by 15 Mya. Similar fossil finds in the Southern Hemisphere put the split between the sooties and mollymawks at 10 Mya.

The fossil record of the albatrosses in the Northern Hemisphere is more complete than that of the Southern, and many fossil forms of albatross have been found in the North Atlantic, which today has no albatrosses. The remains of a colony of short-tailed albatrosses have been uncovered on the island of Bermuda, and the majority of fossil albatrosses from the North Atlantic have been of the genus Phoebastria (the North Pacific albatrosses); one, Phoebastria anglica, has been found in deposits in both North Carolina and England. Due to convergent evolution in particular of the leg and foot bones, remains of the prehistoric pseudotooth birds (Pelagornithidae) may be mistaken for those of extinct albatrosses; Manu may be such a case, and quite certainly the supposed giant albatross femur from the Early Pleistocene (Note: Gelasian, formerly Late Pliocene) Dainichi Formation at Kakegawa, Japan, actually is from one of the last pseudotooth birds. Aldiomedes angustirostris was a uniquely narrow-beaked species from the Pliocene of New Zealand. (Note: The articles on Diomedea, Phoebastria, and Thalassarche contain more data on fossil species of living albatross genera.)

== Morphology and flight ==
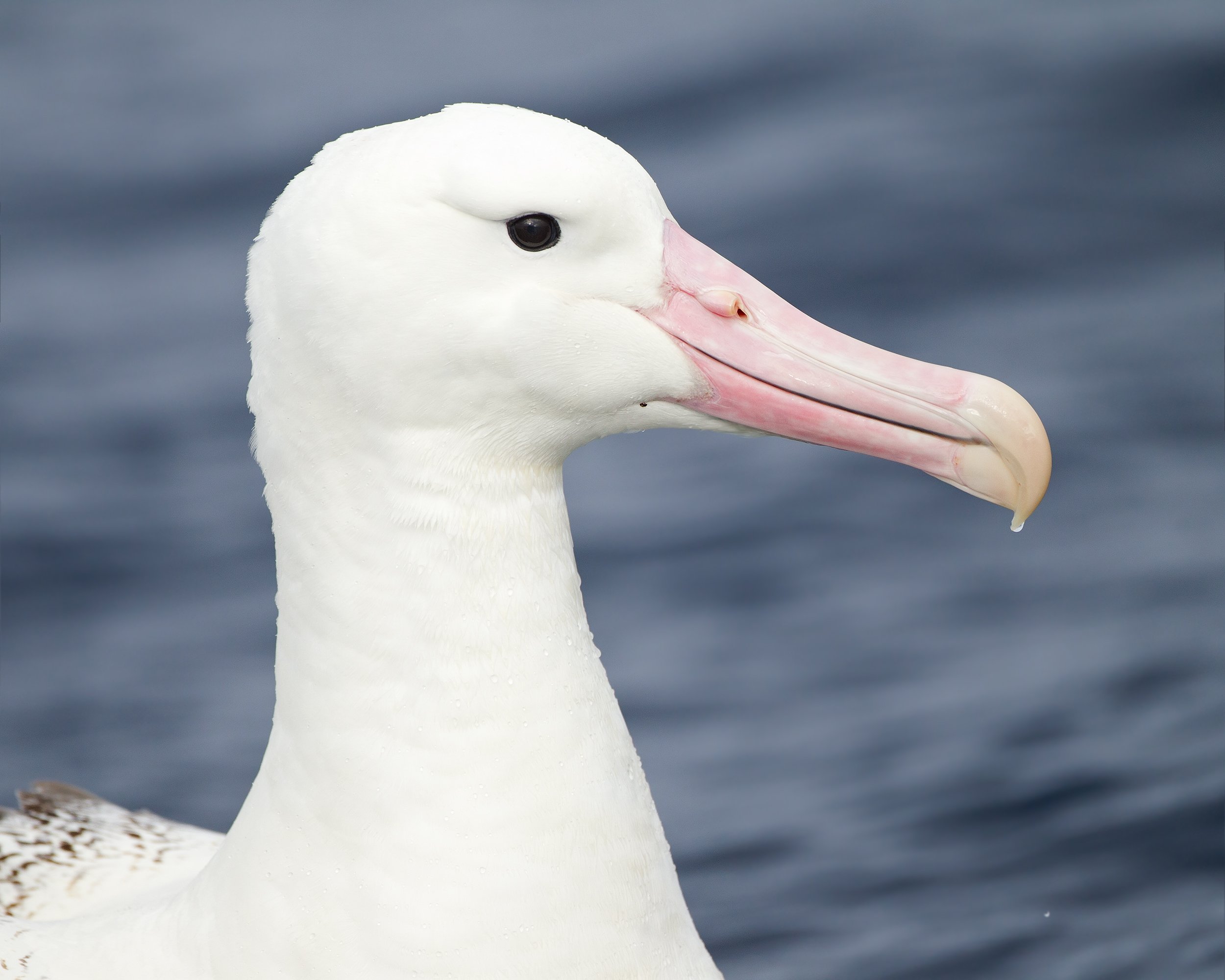
A southern royal albatross: Note the large, hooked beak and nasal tubes.

The albatrosses are a group of large to very large birds; they are the largest of the Procellariiformes. The bill is large, strong, and sharp-edged, with the upper mandible terminating in a large hook. This bill is composed of several horny plates, and along the sides are the two "tubes", long nostrils that give the order its former name (Tubinares, or tubenoses). The tubes of all albatrosses are along the sides of the bill, unlike the rest of the Procellariiformes, where the tubes run along the top of the bill. Albatrosses, along with all Procellariiformes, must excrete the salts they ingest in drinking sea water and eating marine invertebrates. All birds have an enlarged nasal gland at the base of the bill, above their eyes. This gland is inactive in species that do not require it, but in the Procellariiformes, it acts as a salt gland. Scientists are uncertain as to its exact processes, but do know in general terms that it removes salt by secreting a 5% saline solution that drips out of the nose tubes or is forcibly ejected.

Like other Procellariiformes, they use their uniquely developed sense of smell to locate potential food sources, whereas most birds depend on eyesight.

The feet have no hind toe and the three anterior toes are completely webbed. The legs are strong for the Procellariiformes, making them and the giant petrels the only members of that order that can walk well on land.

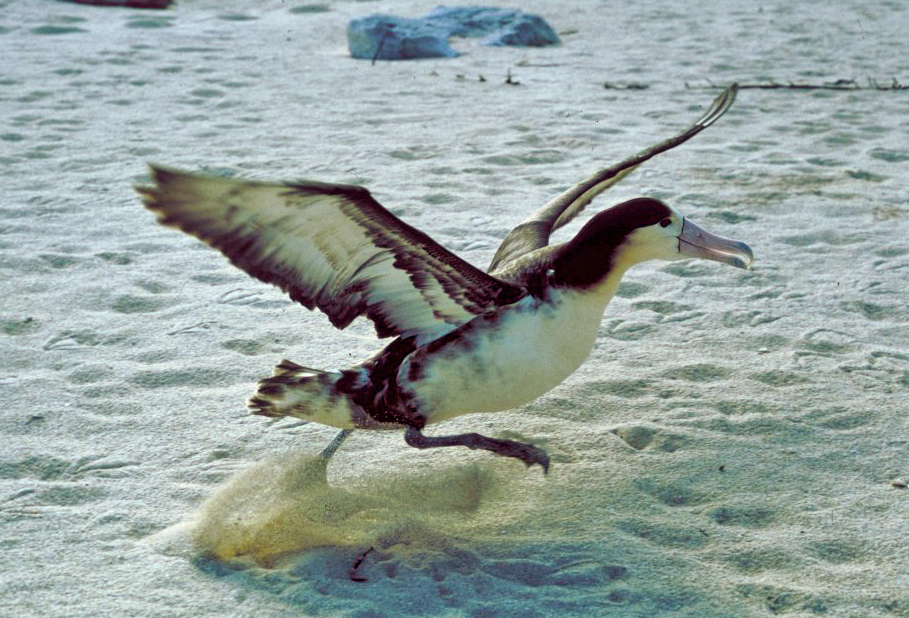
Taking off is the most energetically demanding part of an albatross's journey, requiring the use of flapping flight to provide thrust as well as lift.

The adult plumage of most of the albatrosses is usually some variation of dark upper-wing and back with white undersides, often compared to that of a gull. The extent of colouration varies: the southern royal albatross is almost completely white except for the ends and trailing edges of the wings in fully mature males, while the Amsterdam albatross has an almost juvenile-like breeding plumage with a great deal of brown, particularly a strong brown band around the chest. Several species of mollymawks and North Pacific albatrosses have face markings like eye patches or have grey or yellow on the head and nape. Three albatross species, the black-footed albatross and the two sooty albatrosses, vary completely from the usual patterns and are almost entirely dark brown (or dark grey in places in the case of the light-mantled albatross). Albatrosses take several years to get their full adult breeding plumage.

The wingspans of the largest great albatrosses (genus Diomedea) are the largest of any bird, exceeding 3.40 m (11.2 ft), although the other species' wingspans are considerably smaller, at as low as 1.75 m (5.7 ft). The wings are stiff and cambered, with thickened, streamlined leading edges. Albatrosses travel long distances with two techniques used by many long-winged seabirds – dynamic soaring and slope soaring. Dynamic soaring involves repeatedly rising into wind and descending downwind, thus gaining energy from the vertical wind gradient. The only effort expended is in the turns at the top and bottom of every such loop. This maneuver allows the bird to cover almost 1,000 km/d (620 mi/d) without flapping its wings. Slope soaring uses the rising air on the windward side of large waves.

Albatross have high glide ratios, around 22:1 to 23:1, meaning that for every metre they drop, they can travel forward twenty-two metres. They are aided in soaring by a shoulder-lock, a sheet of tendon that locks the wing when fully extended, allowing the wing to be kept outstretched without any muscle expenditure, a morphological adaptation they share with the giant petrels.

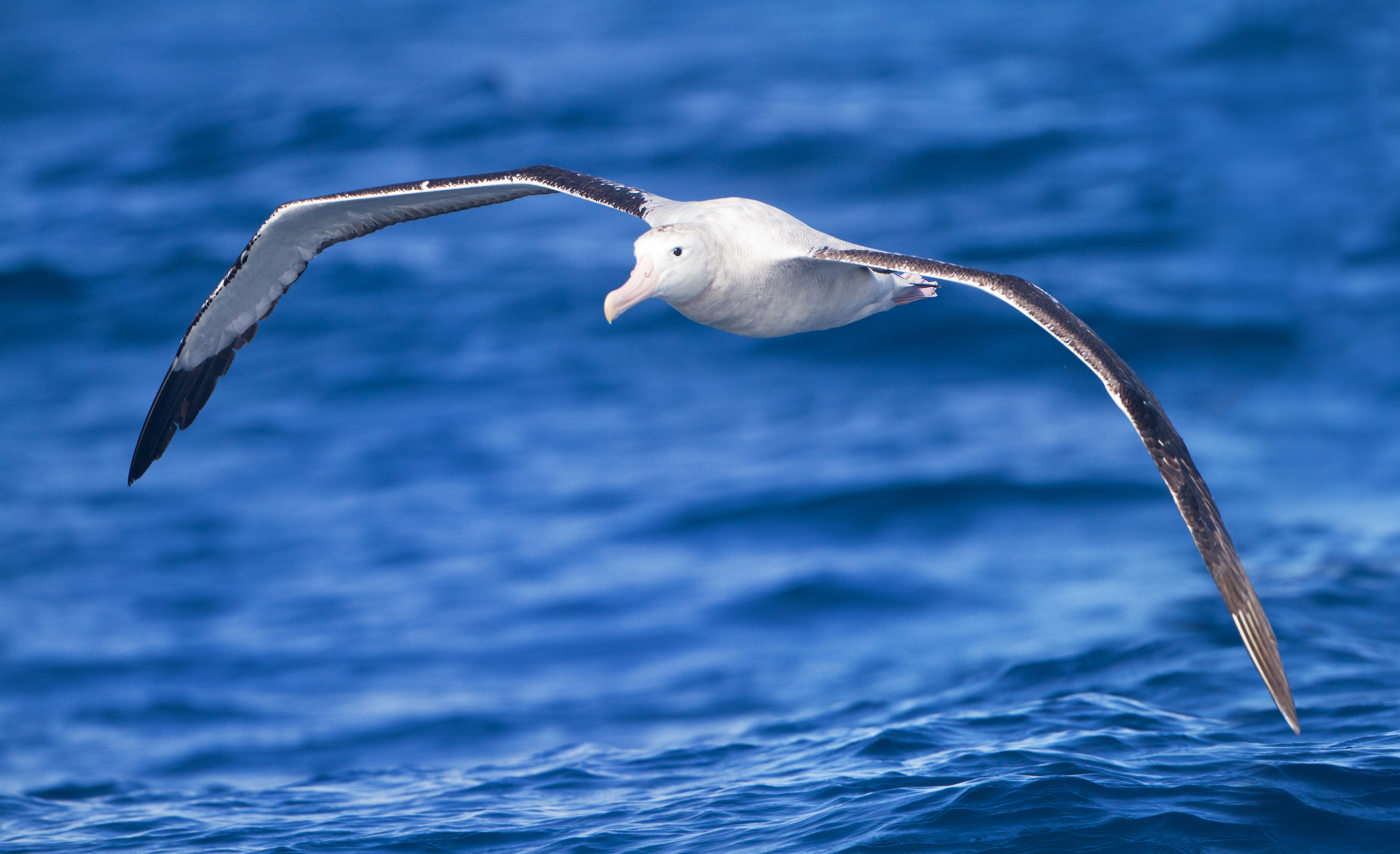
Albatrosses range over huge areas of ocean and regularly circle the globe.

Albatrosses combine these soaring techniques with the use of predictable weather systems; albatrosses in the Southern Hemisphere flying north from their colonies take a clockwise route, and those flying south fly counterclockwise. Albatrosses are so well adapted to this lifestyle that their heart rates while flying are close to their basal heart rate when resting. This efficiency is such that the most energetically demanding aspect of a foraging trip is not the distance covered, but the landings, take-offs and hunting they undertake having found a food source. A common assumption is that Albatrosses must be able to sleep in flight, although no direct evidence has ever been obtained.

This efficient long-distance travelling underlies the albatross's success as a long-distance forager, covering great distances and expending little energy looking for patchily distributed food sources. Their adaptation to gliding flight makes them dependent on wind and waves, but their long wings are ill-suited to powered flight and most species lack the muscles and energy to undertake sustained flapping flight. Albatrosses in calm seas rest on the ocean's surface until the wind picks up again as using powered flight is not energetically worthwhile, though they are capable of flight to avoid danger. The North Pacific albatrosses can use a flight style known as flap-gliding, where the bird progresses by bursts of flapping followed by gliding. When taking off, albatrosses need to take a run up to allow enough air to move under the wing to provide lift.

The dynamic soaring of albatrosses has provided inspiration to airplane designers; German aerospace engineer Johannes Traugott and colleagues have charted the albatross's nuanced flight pattern and are looking for ways to apply this to aircraft, especially in the area of drones and unmanned aircraft.

== Distribution and range at sea ==
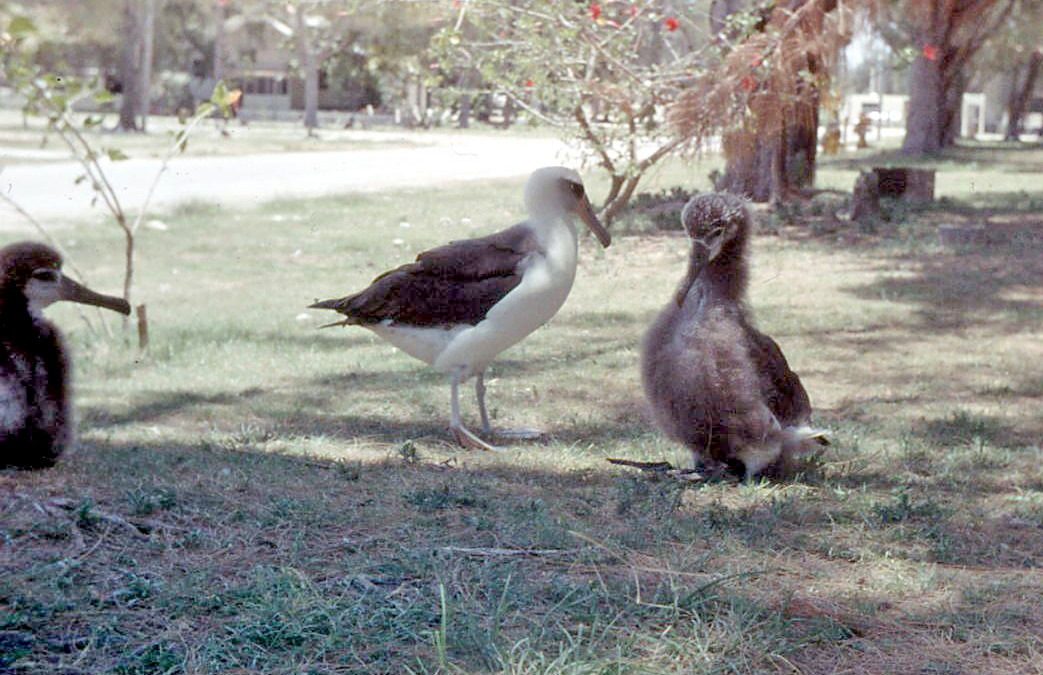
Three birds on Midway Atoll, 1958

Most albatrosses range in the Southern Hemisphere from Antarctica to Australia, South Africa, and South America. The exceptions to this are the four North Pacific albatrosses, of which three occur exclusively in the North Pacific, from Hawaii to Japan, California, and Alaska; and one, the waved albatross, breeds in the Galápagos Islands and feeds off the coast of South America. The need for wind to enable gliding is the reason albatrosses are for the most part confined to higher latitudes; being unsuited to sustained flapping flight makes crossing the doldrums extremely difficult. The exception, the waved albatross, is able to live in the equatorial waters around the Galápagos Islands because of the cool waters of the Humboldt Current and the resulting winds.

Why the albatrosses became extinct in the North Atlantic is not currently known to researchers, although rising sea levels due to an interglacial warming period are thought to have submerged the site of a short-tailed albatross colony that has been excavated in Bermuda. Some southern species have occasionally turned up as vagrants in the North Atlantic and can become exiled, remaining there for decades. One of these exiles, a black-browed albatross named Albert has been observed travelling to gannet colonies in Scotland for at least 50 years in an attempt to breed. Another black-browed albatross nicknamed Albie has been frequently observed across Northern Europe since 2014, and is also believed to be searching for a mate, having been recorded from Germany, Scandinavia and RSPB Bempton Cliffs in Yorkshire, England.

The use of satellite tracking is teaching scientists a great deal about the way albatrosses range across the ocean to find food. They undertake no annual migration, but disperse widely after breeding; Southern Hemisphere species often undertake circumpolar trips. Evidence also exists of separate ranges for different species at sea. A comparison of the foraging niches of two related species that breed on Campbell Island, the Campbell albatross and the grey-headed albatross, showed the Campbell albatross primarily fed over the Campbell Plateau, whereas the grey-headed albatross fed in more pelagic, oceanic waters. Wandering albatrosses also react strongly to bathymetry, feeding only in waters deeper than 1,000 metres (3,000 ft); so rigidly did the satellite plots match this contour that one scientist remarked, "It almost appears as if the birds notice and obey a 'No Entry' sign where the water shallows to less than 1000 (metres)". Also, evidence shows different ranges for the two sexes of the same species; a study of Tristan albatrosses breeding on Gough Island showed that males foraged to the west of Gough and females to the east.

== Ecology ==
=== Diet ===
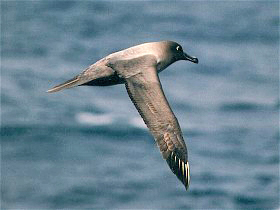
Light-mantled albatrosses regularly dive to feed, and can dive to below 12 m (39 ft).

The albatross diet is predominantly cephalopods such as squid, fish, crustaceans such as krill, other zooplankton, and offal (organ meat); much of their food is taken near the surface, and often include floating carrion. For most species, a comprehensive understanding of diet is known for only the breeding season, when the albatrosses regularly return to land and study is possible. The importance of each of these food sources varies from species to species, and even from population to population; some concentrate on squid alone, others take more krill or fish. Of the two albatross species found in Hawaii, one, the black-footed albatross, takes mostly fish, while the Laysan feeds on squid.

The use of data loggers at sea that record ingestion of water against time (providing a likely time of feeding) suggests that albatrosses predominantly feed during the day. Analysis of the squid beaks regurgitated by albatrosses has shown that many of the squid eaten are too large to have been caught alive, and include midwater species likely to be beyond the reach of albatross, suggesting that, for some species (like the wandering albatross), scavenged squid may be an important part of the diet. Across the studied species, squid from the genera Galiteuthis, Histioteuthis, Illex, Kondakovia, Martialia, and Psychroteuthis made up the highest dietary proportions of various albatross species. The source of these dead squid is a matter of debate; some certainly comes from squid fisheries, but in nature it primarily comes from the die-off that occurs after squid spawning and the vomit of squid-eating whales (sperm whales, pilot whales, and southern bottlenose whales). The diet of other species, like the black-browed albatross or the grey-headed albatross, is rich with smaller species of squid that tend to sink after death, and scavenging is not assumed to play a large role in their diet. The waved albatross has been observed practising kleptoparasitism, harassing boobies to steal their food, making it the only member of its order to do so regularly.

Until recently, albatrosses were thought to be predominantly surface feeders, swimming at the surface and snapping up squid and fish pushed to the surface by currents, predators, or death. The deployment of capillary depth recorders, which record the maximum dive depth undertaken by a bird, has shown that while some species, such as the wandering albatross, do not dive deeper than a metre, some species, such as the light-mantled albatross, have a mean diving depth of almost 5 m (16 ft) and can dive as deep as 12.5 m (41 ft). In addition to surface feeding and diving, they have also been observed plunge diving from the air to snatch prey.

=== Breeding and dancing ===
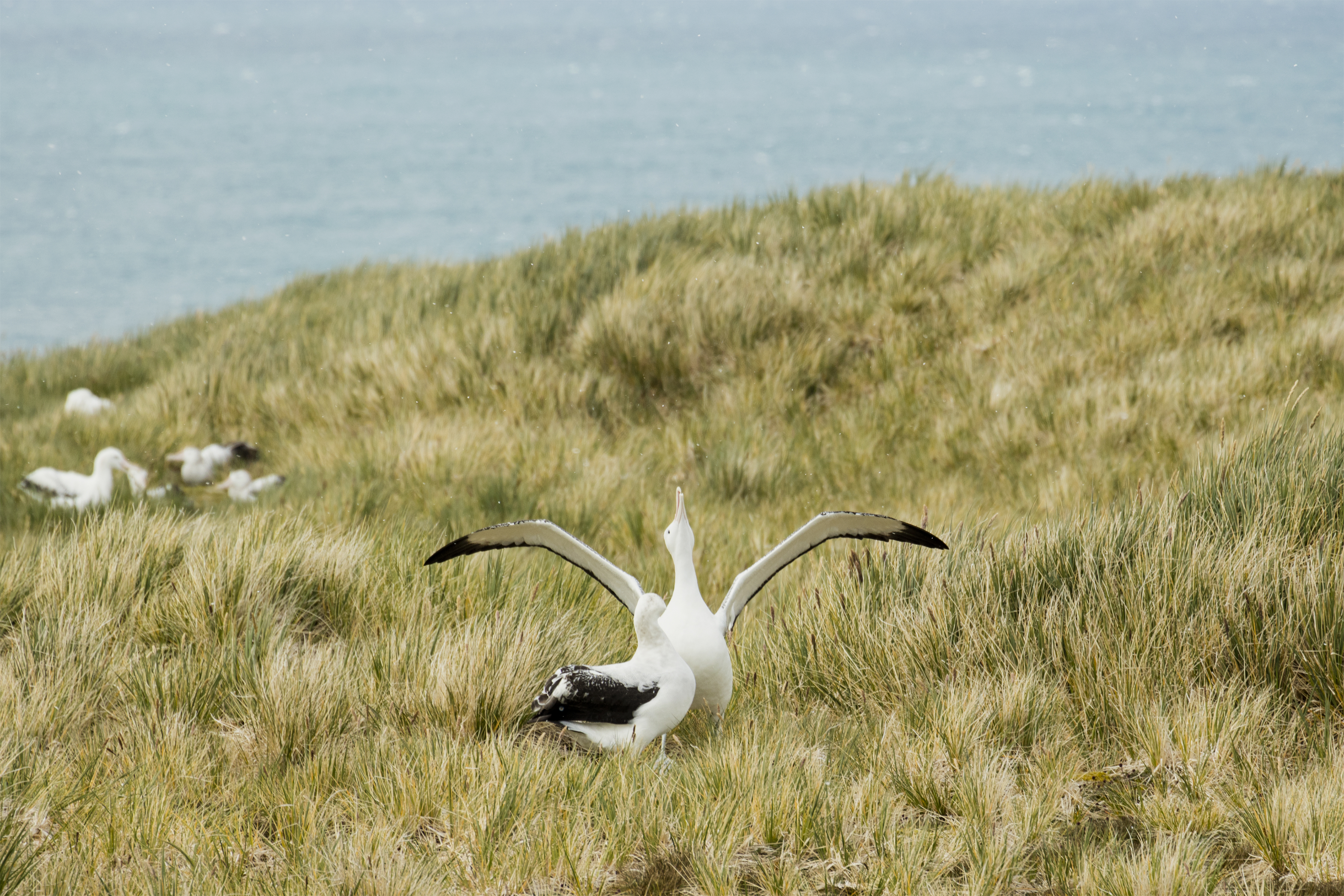
Wandering albatross male courting a female with sky-pointing, clucking, and wing-spreading rituals

Albatrosses are colonial, usually nesting on isolated islands; where colonies are on larger landmasses, they are found on exposed headlands with good approaches from the sea in several directions, like the colony on the Otago Peninsula in Dunedin, New Zealand. Many Buller's albatrosses and black-footed albatrosses nest under trees in open forest. Colonies vary from the very dense aggregations favoured by the mollymawks (black-browed albatross colonies on the Falkland Islands have densities of 70 nests per 100 m^{2}) to the much looser groups and widely spaced individual nests favoured by the sooty and great albatrosses. All albatross colonies are on islands that historically were free of land mammals. Albatrosses are highly philopatric, meaning they usually return to their natal colony to breed. This tendency is so strong that a study of Laysan albatrosses showed that the average distance between hatching site and the site where a bird established its own territory was 22 m (72 ft).

Albatrosses live much longer than other birds; they delay breeding for longer and invest more effort into fewer young. Most species survive upwards of 50 years, the oldest recorded being a Laysan albatross named Wisdom that was ringed in 1956 as a mature adult and hatched another chick in February 2021, making her at least 70 years old. She is the oldest confirmed wild bird and the oldest banded bird in the world.

Albatrosses reach sexual maturity slowly, after about five years, but even once they have reached maturity, they do not begin to breed for another few years (even up to 10 years for some species). Young nonbreeders attend a colony prior to beginning to breed, spending many years practising the elaborate breeding rituals and "dances" for which the family is famous. Birds arriving back at the colony for the first time already have the stereotyped behaviours that compose albatross language, but can neither "read" that behaviour as exhibited by other birds nor respond appropriately.

The repertoire of behaviour involves synchronised performances of various actions such as preening, pointing, calling, bill clacking, staring, and combinations of such behaviours (such as the sky-call).

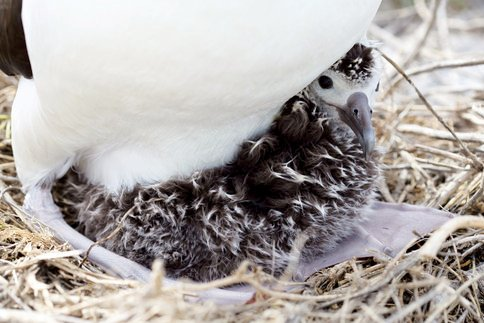
An albatross chick at Northwestern Hawaiian Islands Marine National Monument, Midway Atoll

Albatrosses are held to undertake these elaborate and painstaking rituals to ensure that the appropriate partner has been chosen and to perfect partner recognition, as egg laying and chick rearing is a huge investment. Even species that can complete an egg-laying cycle in under a year seldom lay eggs in consecutive years. The great albatrosses (i.e., wandering albatross) take over a year to raise a chick from laying to fledging. Albatrosses lay a single subelliptical egg, white with reddish-brown spots, in a breeding season; if the egg is lost to predators or accidentally broken, then no further breeding attempts are made that year. The larger eggs weigh from 200 to 510 g (7.1 to 18.0 oz). The "divorce" of a pair is a rare occurrence, due to the diminished lifetime reproductive success it causes, and usually happens only after several years of breeding failure.

All the southern albatrosses create large nests for their egg, using grass, shrubs, soil, peat, and even penguin feathers, whereas the three species in the North Pacific make more rudimentary nests. The waved albatross, though, makes no nest and even moves its egg around the pair's territory, as much as 50 m (160 ft), sometimes causing it to lose the egg. In all albatross species, both parents incubate the egg in stints that last between one day and three weeks. Incubation lasts around 70 to 80 days (longer for the larger albatrosses), the longest incubation period of any bird. It can be an energetically demanding process, with the adult losing as much as 83 g (2.9 oz) of body weight a day.

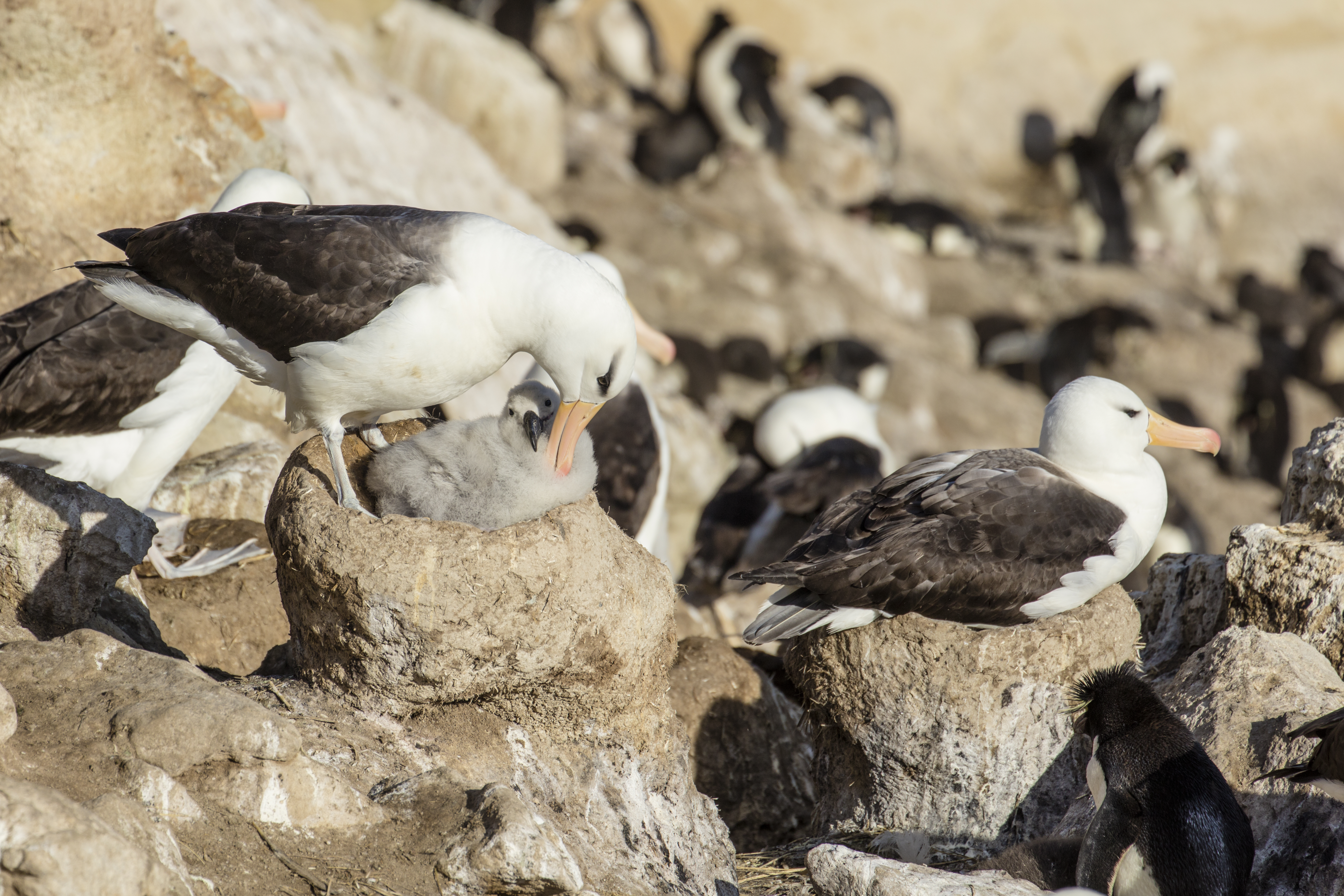
Black-browed albatross preening its chick (New Island, Falkland Islands). Albatrosses brood young chicks until they are large enough to thermoregulate.

After hatching, the chick, which is semi-altricial, is brooded and guarded for three weeks until it is large enough to defend and thermoregulate itself. During this period, the parents feed the chick small meals when they relieve each other from duty. After the brooding period is over, the chick is fed in regular intervals by both parents. The parents adopt alternative patterns of short and long foraging trips, providing meals that weigh around 12% of their body weight (around 600 g, or 21 oz). The meals are composed of fresh squid, fish, and krill, as well as stomach oil, an energy-rich food that is lighter to carry than undigested prey items. This oil is created in a stomach organ known as a proventriculus from digested prey items by most Procellariiformes, and gives them their distinctive musty smell.

Albatross chicks take a long time to fledge. In the case of the great albatrosses, it can take up to 280 days; even for the smaller albatrosses, it takes between 140 and 170 days. Like many seabirds, albatross chicks will gain enough weight to be heavier than their parents, and prior to fledging, they use these reserves to build up body condition (particularly growing all their flight feathers), usually fledging at the same weight as their parents. Between 15 and 65% of those fledged survive to breed. Albatross chicks fledge on their own and receive no further help from their parents, which return to the nest after fledging, unaware their chick has left. Studies of juveniles dispersing at sea have suggested an innate migration behaviour, a genetically coded navigation route, which helps young birds when they are first out at sea.

Hybridization is rare in albatrosses, largely due to the low incidence of breeding-site vagrancy.

== In culture ==
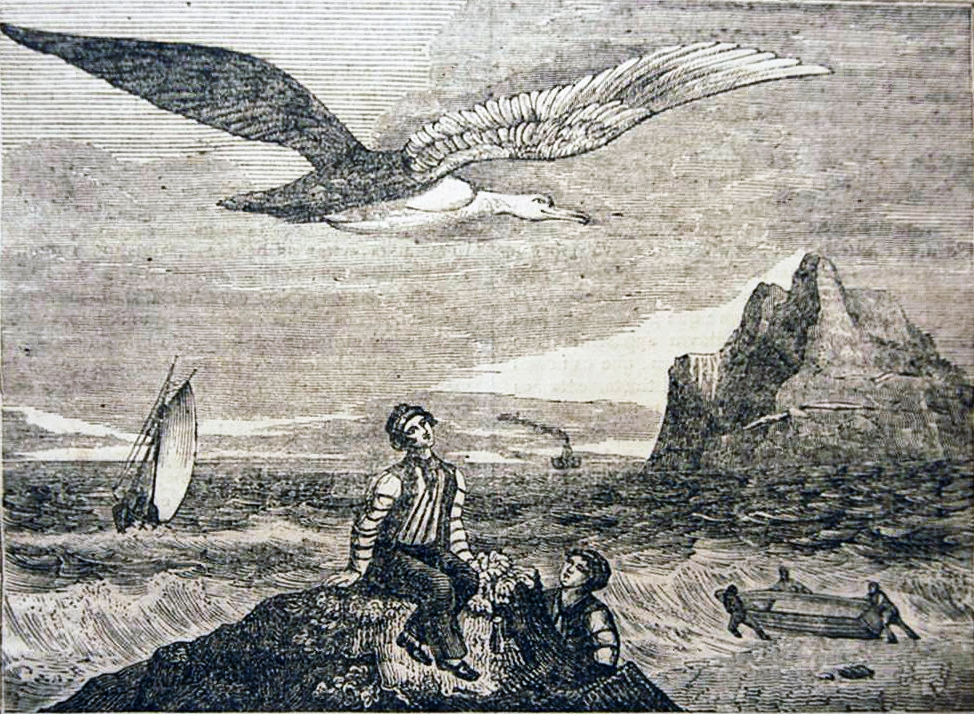
An 1837 woodcut from the journal O Panorama

Albatrosses are described in the Handbook of World Birds as "the most legendary of all birds". An albatross is the central emblem in The Rime of the Ancient Mariner by Samuel Taylor Coleridge in 1798, representing the innocence and beauty of God's creation. The albatross metaphor is derived from this poem; someone bearing a burden or facing an obstacle is said to have "an albatross around his neck", the punishment given to the mariner who killed the albatross. A widespread myth holds that sailors believe shooting or harming an albatross is disastrous, due in part to the poem; in truth, sailors regularly killed and ate them, as reported by James Cook in 1772. However, other sailors reportedly caught the birds but let them free again, possibly believing that albatrosses were the souls of lost sailors, so killing them would bring bad luck. The head of an albatross being caught with a hook is used as the emblem of the Cape Horners, i.e., sailors who have rounded Cape Horn on freighters under sail; captains of such ships even received themselves the title "albatrosses" in the Cape Horners' organisation.

A captive albatross tormented by jeering sailors is also a metaphor for the social travails of the sensitive poète maudit in Charles Baudelaire's poem L'albatros:

Le Poète est semblable au prince des nuées
Qui hante la tempête et se rit de l'archer;
Exilé sur le sol au milieu des huées,
Ses ailes de géant l'empêchent de marcher.

The poet is like this prince of the clouds,
who haunts the storm and mocks the archer;
but exiled on earth surrounded by jeers,
his giant wings make him helpless to walk.

In golf, shooting three under par on a single hole has been termed scoring an "albatross", as a continuation on the birdie and eagle theme.

=== Non-European mythologies ===
The Māori used the wing bones of the albatross to carve flutes. In Hawaiian religion, Laysan albatrosses are considered ʻaumakua, being a sacred manifestation of the ancestors, and quite possibly also the sacred bird of Kāne. Japanese mythology, by contrast, refers to the short-tailed albatross as ahodori, "fool bird", due to its habit of disregarding terrestrial predators, making it easy prey for feather collectors.

=== Birdwatching ===
Albatrosses are popular birds for birdwatchers, and their colonies are popular destinations for ecotourists. Regular birdwatching trips are taken out of many coastal towns and cities to see pelagic seabirds. Albatrosses are easily attracted to these sightseeing boats by the deployment of fish oil and burley into the sea. Visits to colonies can be very popular; the northern royal albatross colony at Taiaroa Head in Dunedin, New Zealand, attracts 40,000 visitors a year.

== Threats and conservation ==
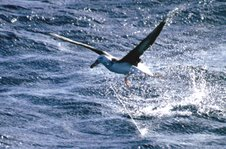
This black-browed albatross has been hooked on a longline.

In spite of often being accorded legendary status, albatrosses have not escaped either indirect or direct pressure from humans. Early encounters with albatrosses by Polynesians and Aleuts resulted in hunting and in some cases extirpation from some islands (such as Easter Island). As Europeans began sailing the world, they, too, began to hunt albatross, "fishing" for them from boats to serve at the table or blasting them for sport. This sport reached its peak on emigration lines bound for Australia, and only died down when ships became too fast to fish from, and regulations forbade the discharge of weapons for safety reasons. In the 19th century, albatross colonies, particularly those in the North Pacific, were harvested for the feather trade, leading to the near-extinction of the short-tailed albatross.

Of the 22 albatross species recognised by IUCN on their Red List, 15 are threatened with extinction, that is, Critically Endangered (Tristan albatross and waved albatross), Endangered (7 species), or Vulnerable (6 species). Six further species are considered as Near Threatened and only one of Least Concern. One of the main threats is commercial longline fishing, as the albatrosses and other seabirds—which will readily feed on offal—are attracted to the set bait, become hooked on the lines and drown. An estimated 100,000 albatross per year are killed in this fashion. Unregulated pirate fisheries exacerbate the problem. A study showed that potentially illegal longline fishing activities are highly concentrated in areas of illegally-caught fish species, and the risk to bycatch albatrosses is significantly higher in areas where these illegal longline fishing vessels operate.

On Midway Atoll, collisions between Laysan albatrosses and aircraft have resulted in human and bird deaths, as well as severe disruptions in military flight operations. Studies were made in the late 1950s and early 1960s that examined the results of control methods such as the killing of birds, the levelling and clearing of land to eliminate updrafts, and the destruction of annual nesting sites. Tall structures such as traffic control and radio towers killed 3000 birds in flight collisions during 1964–1965 before the towers were taken down. Closure of Naval Air Facility Midway in 1993 eliminated the problem of collisions with military aircraft. By 2008, it was noted that reduction in human activity had helped reduce bird deaths, though lead paint pollution near military buildings continued to poison birds by ingestion. Albatross plumes were popular in the early 20th century. In 1909 alone, over 300,000 albatrosses were killed on Midway Island and Laysan Island for their plumes.

Another threat to albatrosses is introduced species, such as rats or feral cats, which directly attack albatrosses or their chicks and eggs. Albatrosses have evolved to breed on islands where land mammals are absent and have not developed defences against them. Even species as small as mice can be detrimental; on Gough Island, the chicks of Tristan albatrosses are attacked and eaten alive by introduced house mice. Introduced species can have other indirect effects; cattle overgrazed essential cover on Amsterdam Island, threatening the Amsterdam albatross; on other islands, introduced plants reduce potential nesting habitat.

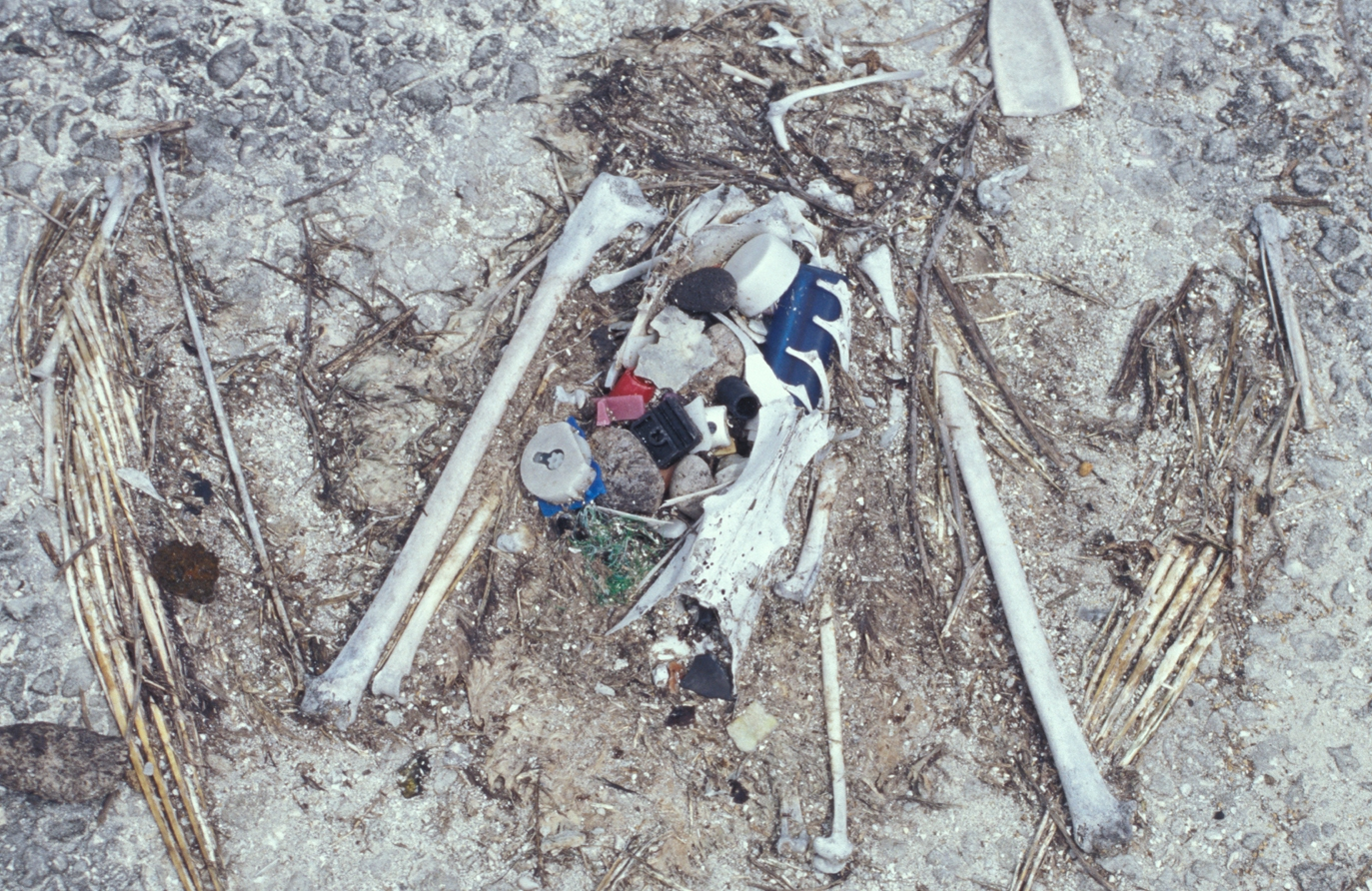
The remains of this Laysan albatross chick show the plastic ingested before death, including a bottle cap and lighter.

Ingestion of plastic flotsam is another problem, one faced by many seabirds. The amount of plastic in the seas has increased dramatically since the first record in the 1960s, coming from waste discarded by ships, offshore dumping, litter on beaches, and waste washed to sea by rivers. It is impossible to digest and takes up space in the stomach or gizzard that should be used for food, or can cause an obstruction that starves the bird directly. Studies of birds in the North Pacific have shown that ingestion of plastics results in declining body weight and body condition. This plastic is sometimes regurgitated and fed to chicks; a study of Laysan albatross chicks on Midway Atoll showed large amounts of ingested plastic in naturally dead chicks compared to healthy chicks killed in accidents. While not the direct cause of death, this plastic causes physiological stress and causes the chick to feel full during feedings, reducing its food intake and the chances of survival.

Scientists and conservationists (most importantly BirdLife International and their partners, who run the Save the Albatross campaign) are working with governments and fishermen to find solutions to the threats albatrosses face. Techniques such as setting longline bait at night, dyeing the bait blue, setting the bait underwater, increasing the amount of weight on lines, and using bird scarers can all reduce the seabird bycatch. For example, a collaborative study between scientists and fishermen in New Zealand successfully tested an underwater setting device for longliners, which set the lines below the reach of vulnerable albatross species. The use of some of these techniques in the Patagonian toothfish fishery in the Falkland Islands is thought to have reduced the number of black-browed albatrosses taken by the fleet between 1994 and 2004. Conservationists have also worked on the field of island restoration, removing introduced species that threaten native wildlife, which protects albatrosses from introduced predators.

One important step towards protecting albatrosses and other seabirds is the 2001 treaty, the Agreement on the Conservation of Albatrosses and Petrels, which came into force in 2004 and has been ratified by thirteen countries, Argentina, Australia, Brazil, Chile, Ecuador, France, New Zealand, Norway, Peru, South Africa, Spain, the United Kingdom, and Uruguay. The treaty requires these countries to take specific actions to reduce bycatch, pollution and to remove introduced species from nesting islands.

== Species ==
Since 1996, albatrosses have been divided into four genera. The number of species is a matter of debate. The IUCN and BirdLife International recognise 22 extant species (listed below), ITIS recognise 21 (the 22 below minus T. steadi), and a 2004 paper proposed a reduction to 13 (indicated in parentheses below), comprising the traditional 14 species minus D. amsterdamensis.

Image	Genus	Living species
	Diomedea Linnaeus, 1758 Great albatrosses	Wandering Albatross (D. exulans); Antipodean albatross (D. (exulans) antipodensis); Amsterdam albatross (D. (exulans) amsterdamensis); Tristan albatross (D. (exulans) dabbenena); Northern royal albatross (D. (epomophora) sanfordi); Southern royal albatross (D. epomophora)
	Phoebastria Reichenbach, 1853 North Pacific albatrosses	Waved albatross (P. irrorata); Short-tailed albatross (P. albatrus); Black-footed albatross (P. nigripes); Laysan albatross (P. immutabilis)
	Thalassarche Reichenbach, 1853 Mollymawks	Black-browed albatross (T. melanophris); Campbell albatross (T. (melanophris) impavida); Shy albatross (T. cauta); White-capped albatross (T. (cauta) steadi); Chatham albatross (T. (cauta) eremita); Salvin's albatross (T. (cauta) salvini); Grey-headed albatross (T. chrysostoma); Atlantic yellow-nosed albatross (T. chlororhynchos); Indian yellow-nosed albatross (T. (chlororhynchos) carteri); Buller's albatross (T. bulleri)
	Phoebetria Reichenbach, 1853 Sooty albatrosses	Sooty albatross (P. fusca); Light-mantled albatross (P. palpebrata)

== See also ==
- List of albatross breeding locations
