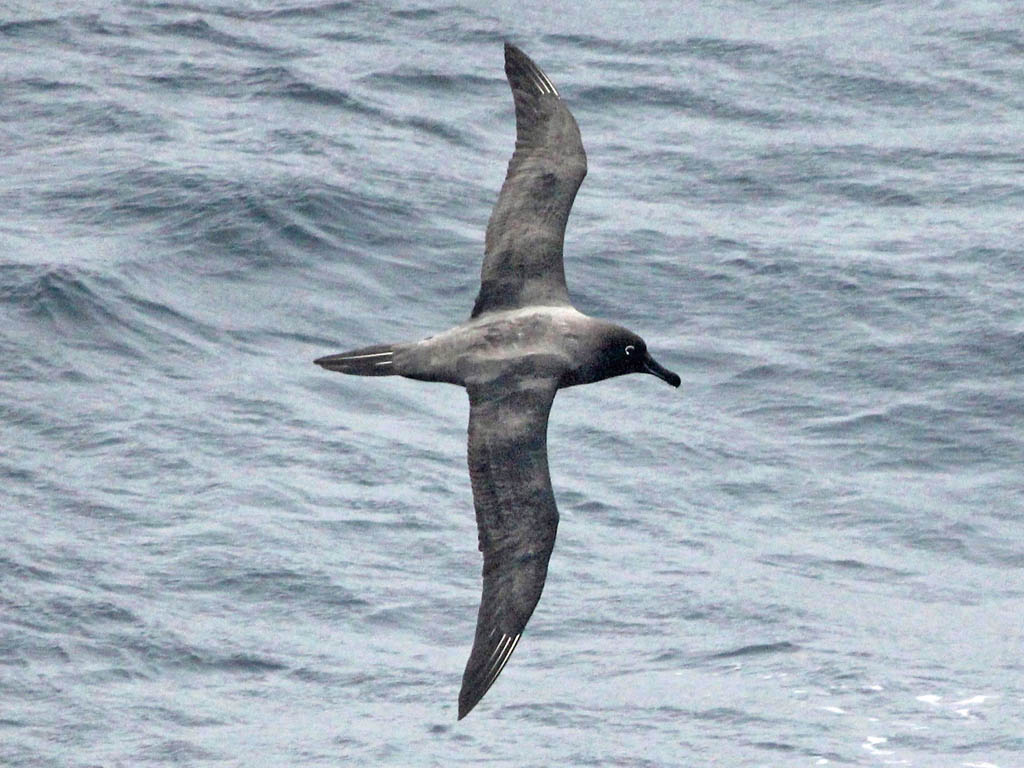

Conservation status
- Endangered (IUCN 3.1)

Scientific classification
- Kingdom: Animalia
- Phylum: Chordata
- Class: Aves
- Order: Procellariiformes
- Family: Diomedeidae
- Genus: Phoebetria
- Species: P. fusca

Binomial name
- Phoebetria fusca (Hilsenberg, 1822)

= Sooty albatross =

Species of marine bird

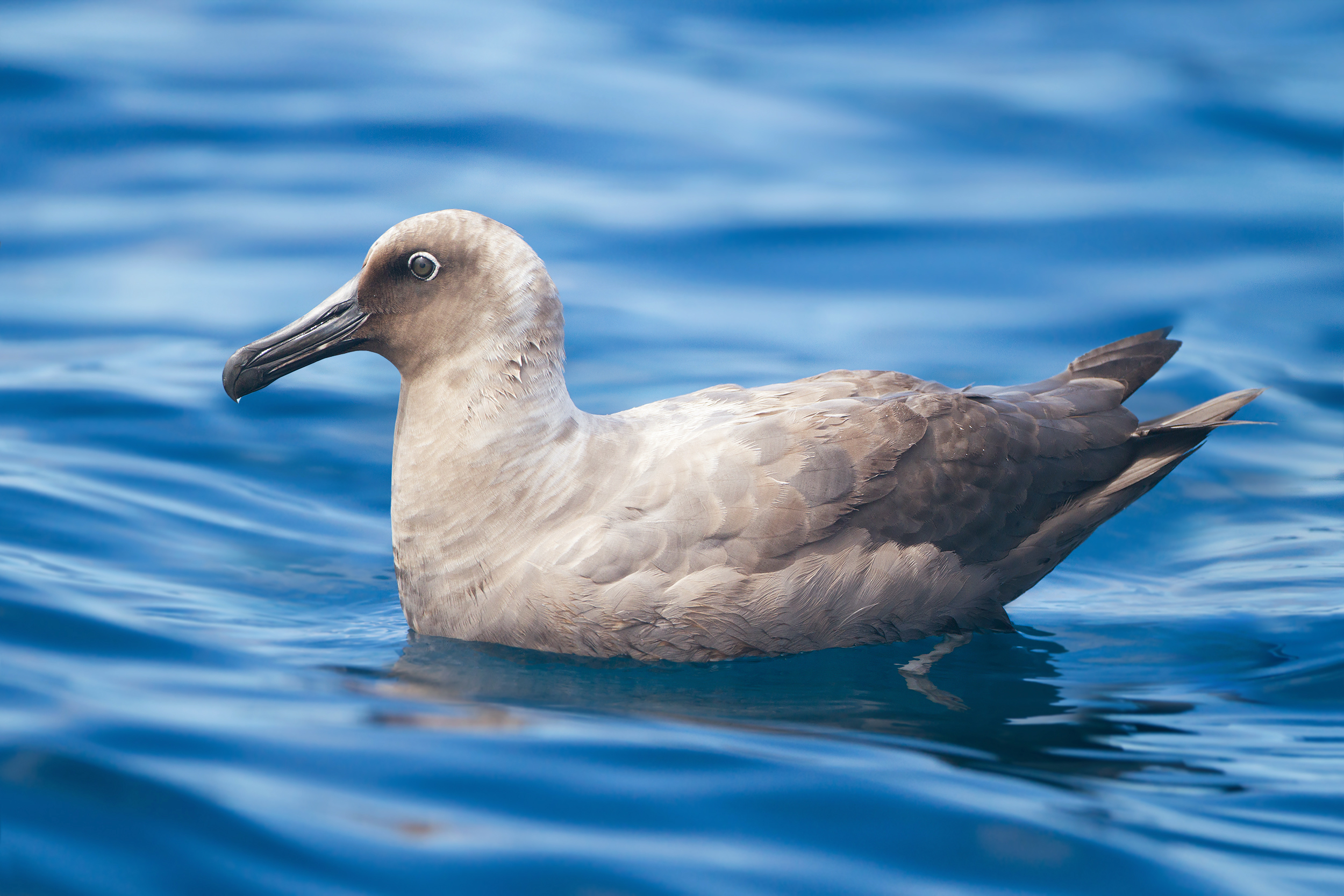
Immature

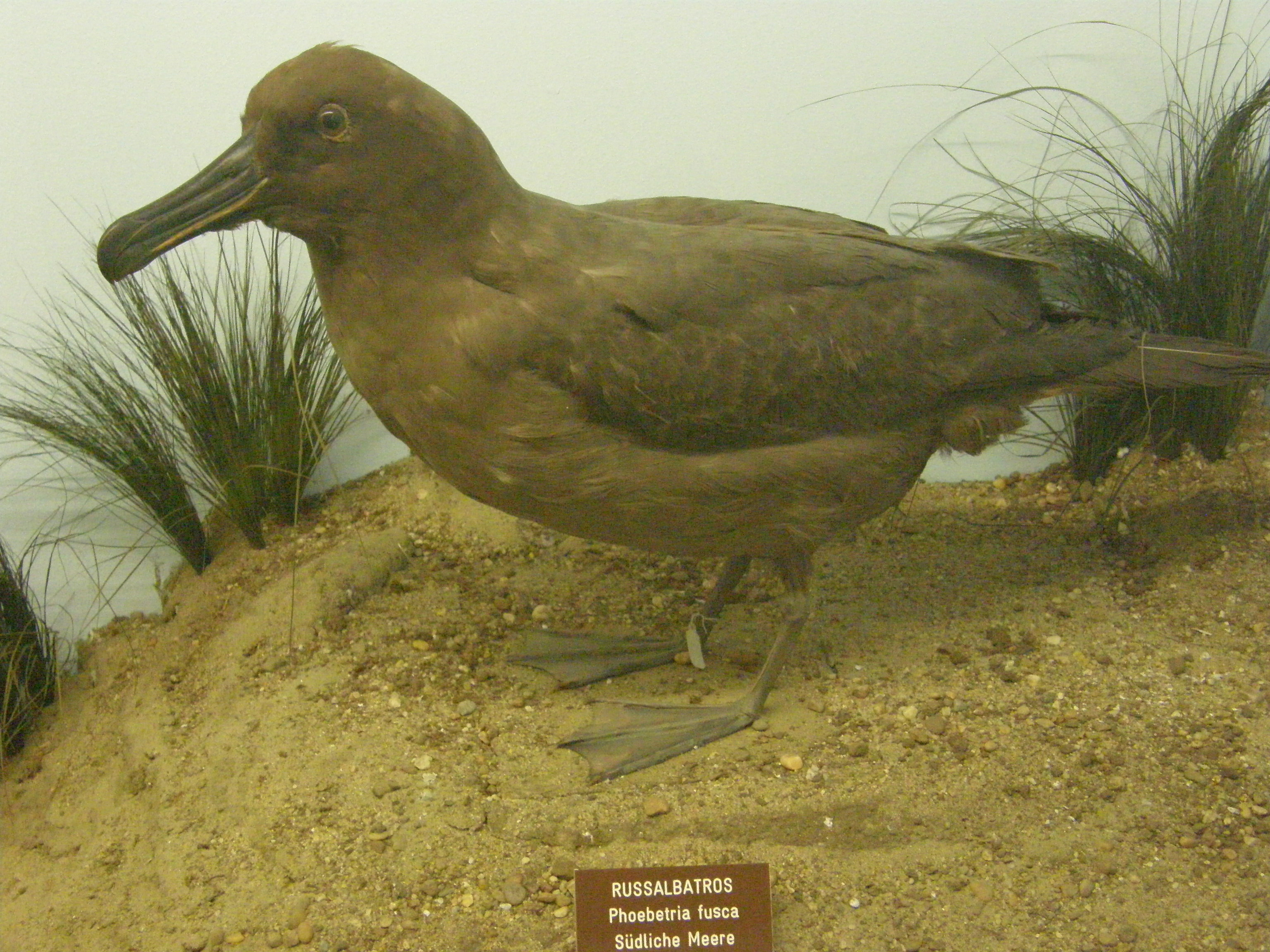
Stuffed specimen at the Natural History Museum, Vienna

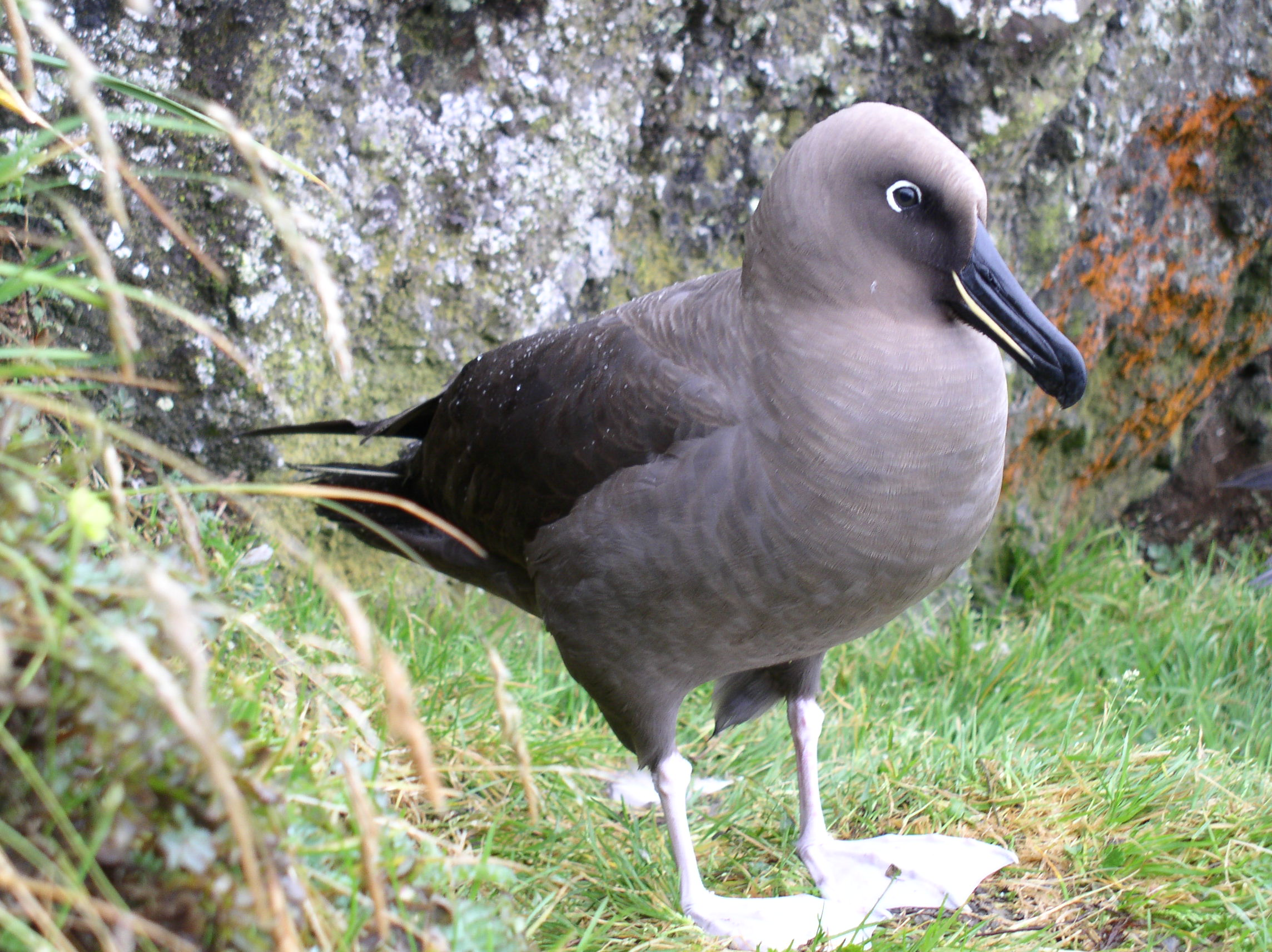
Sooty albatross on Crozet Island

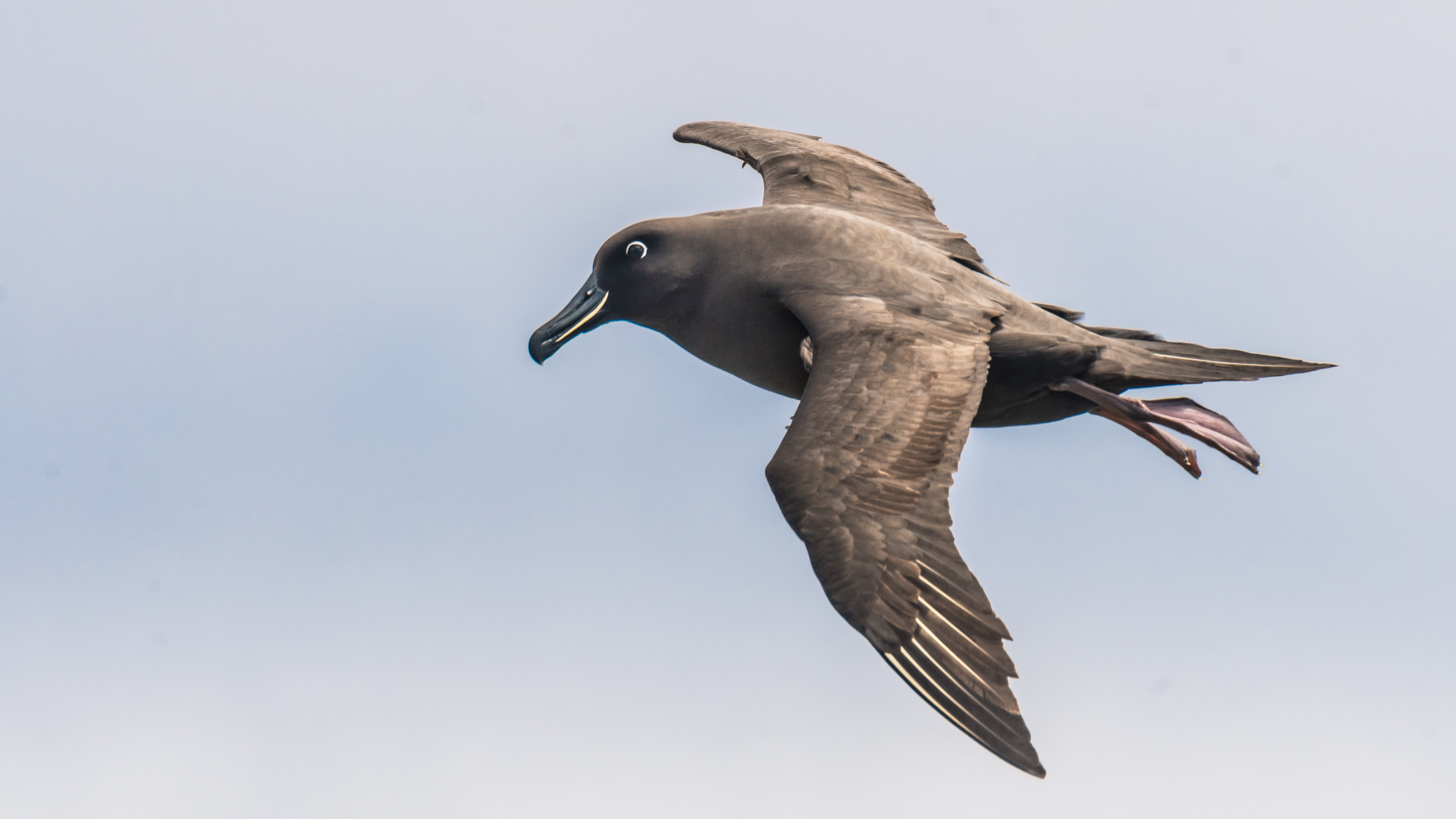
Sooty albatross on Amsterdam Island

The sooty albatross (Phoebetria fusca), also known to sailors as the Quaker, is a species of marine bird belonging to the albatross family Diomedeidae. It is a medium-sized albatross that sports a sooty-brown or sooty-black color. It can be found in the southern Atlantic Ocean, the southern Indian Ocean, and the Southern Ocean. This bird scavenges for squid, fish, and carrion. Like other albatrosses, these birds mate for life and return to the same breeding spots every season. A single pair will mate every other year on a variety of islands in the southern Atlantic Ocean and the southern Indian Ocean islands. This bird is an endangered species and conservation efforts are taking place.

== Taxonomy ==
The sooty albatross belongs to the genus Phoebetria of which there are two species: P. palpebrata (Foster, 1785) and P. fusca (Hilsenberg, 1822). The two species were discovered separately but were not placed in the same genus until 1913, which was later confirmed by cytochrome-b gene sequencing. This species is monotypic with no subspecies.

Sooty albatrosses belong to the Diomedeidae family, which comprises albatrosses and mollymawks. Of the Diomedeidae, the sooty albatross belongs to the genus Phoebetria, one of the four genera in the family. Diomedeidae is a part of the order Procellariiformes which are tube-nosed seabirds including shearwaters, fulmars, petrels, and of course albatrosses.

== Description ==
The sooty albatross is a medium-sized albatross, measuring about 85 cm (33 in) from head to tail, with a 2 m (6.6 ft) wingspan. Average adult body mass is about 2.5 kg (5.5 lbs), with males weighing more than females. Plumage ranges from a sooty-brown to a sooty-black color depending on the individual, but the head and sometimes tail are typically darker than the rest of the body. Around almost the entire eye, excluding the inner corner, a white ring is present. On the lower jaw, a yellow to orange line is present on the beak, which is otherwise a uniform glossy black. Juvenile or immature sooty albatrosses look nearly identical after losing their down feathers.

== Distribution and habitat ==
The sooty albatross can be found in the South Atlantic Ocean, the southern Indian Ocean, and the Southern Ocean between Australia and South America, although they have not been recorded in the South Pacific Ocean between Australia and South America. Its northern and southern limits are approximately 20°S and 65°S, respectively, and an eastern and western limit of approximately 160°E and 75°W.

This albatross nests on islands in the southern Atlantic Ocean (Gough Island and the Tristan da Cunha group) and the southern Indian Ocean (Prince Edward Island, Marion Island, the Crozet Islands, Amsterdam Island, and the Kerguelen Islands).

In general, the sooty albatross can be found foraging over deep ocean. Non-breeding adults do not often venture out of their native oceans but have a broader foraging range, while breeding adults forage closer to their breeding sites, within 600 km (370 mi), and juvenile birds tend to be confined to subtropical waters.

== Behavior and ecology ==
The sooty albatross is a marine bird that spends more of its non-breeding life over the ocean. When breeding, it will return to land and continue to breed there for life. Below is a closer look into the feeding and reproductive habits of the sooty albatross.

Sooty albatrosses build their nests on ledges of coastal and inland cliffs. They typically breed in groups of 5-60 nests but can live in solidarity. They return to their breeding grounds in mid-July to early September, making them biennial breeders. Sooty Albatross colonies can be marked by their distinctive sky calls, which are loud and repeating pee-oo’s. This bird species is also distinctive in its synchronized flight patterns, in which they switch flight patterns and angles during active flight so that the birds may fly in unison. The Sooty Albatross displays complex social and mating behaviors that are described as the 15 signs. This guide records Albatross behaviors, including brief first encounters, prolonged encounters, and bonding behaviors that occur throughout several months when the Sooty Albatrosses are courting. Sooty Albatrosses are shy in their interactions, typically feeding in solitude at sea, but have been seen associating with yellow-nosed mollymawks and whales. This bird species forages during the daytime, with peak feeding activity being 3 hours before dusk.

=== Feeding ===
The sooty albatross feeds almost exclusively by surface-seizing, a method that requires little to no submersion. Their diet consists of cephalopods (mainly squid), fish, other seabirds, crustaceans, and carrion. They are not known to deep dive, but instead scavenge at the surface of the ocean for already-deceased and floating prey, especially squid. Although cephalopods consistently make up the bulk of their diet, the proportion of each constituent varies with location of feeding, relative abundance of prey, and time of year.

=== Reproduction ===
The sooty albatross is a biennial breeder, meaning they breed every other year, with the exception of a mating pair unsuccessfully rearing a chick, in which case they will try again the following year. This is because the mating season spans from June of one year to May of the next and, unlike other albatrosses, they do not participate in replacement laying.

During mating season, sooty albatrosses are usually found in colonies of up to 50 mating pairs, though are occasionally found nesting as a single pair. These birds, like many other albatross species, build life-long partnerships and often return to the exact same location each mating season. A mating pair will use materials found around their nesting site (including grass, mud, and moss) to build a short nest with a central indent. The nest is typically built on cliffs or on steep sloped for easy arrival and departure. The pair is very protective of their nest, and will defend it with threat displays to assert their territory.

Pairs typically arrive at their mating colony or location in mid July, where they will lay their egg between mid September to the end of October. The egg measures 9.5–10.8 cm (3.7–4.3 in) in length and 5.9–6.9 cm (2.3–2.7 in) in width, with a mass of 185–265 g (6.5–9.3 oz). From then until mid January of the next year, they will incubate their egg for approximately 70 days until hatching. Parents will brood their chicks for roughly three months, taking turns incubating and hunting, before departing. The chicks remain at the breeding site until the end of May when they are ready to fledge.

== Conservation ==
The IUCN ranks the sooty albatross as an endangered species, with the most recent count of mature species being between 22,724 and 27,968 individuals and declining. Over the past three generations (about 90 years), there has been an overall decrease in population size of 60%, although the rate has been slowing down recently. Threats to this population and conservation efforts are discussed below.

=== Threats ===
Threats to this species are driven by both natural and anthropogenic effects. Natural forces include the predation of chicks by giant petrels and mice on islands, infectious diseases such as avian cholera, and the disturbance of breeding grounds by introduced animals and fires.

Anthropogenic forces threatening the sooty albatross includes pollution and long-line fisheries. Similar to almost all (if not all) seabirds and marine species, the sooty albatross is affected by pollution of plastics, oils, and chemicals. Long-line fishing is one of the biggest threats to albatrosses across the world, and the sooty albatross is not an exception. These fishing vessels include commercial and illegal initiatives, like the tuna and Patagonian tooth fish industries.

=== Conservation efforts ===
Efforts are being made to reduce the decline of this species. One notable example is the use of fishing techniques that are specifically designed to decrease the amount of seabird-bycatch of long-line fishing vessels. Australia is also working to preserve breeding areas of this bird. Moreover, the sooty albatross is protected on Tristan da Cunha, Gough Island in a nature preserve and a World Heritage Site, and Price Edward Island is also a nature reserve.

Scientists propose that frequent population surveys are conducted at breeding sites, and that the correlation between foraging areas and long-line fisheries is further examined.

Breeding Population and Trends
Breeding Location	Breeding Pair	Trend
Gough Island	2,500 to 5,000	– 50% over 28 years
Tristan da Cunha	3,157	Unknown
Crozet Islands	2,080 to 2,200	−58% between 1980 and 1995 (Possession Island only)
Prince Edward Island and Marion Island	3,150	−25% between 1990 and 1998 (Marion Island only)
Kerguelen Islands	<5	Unknown
Amsterdam Island	470	Unknown
Total	11,362 to 13,984	−75% over 90 years

== See also ==
- More about the albatross family Diomediedae
- More about the sooty albatross genus Phoebetria
- More on marine birds
- More about longline fishing and the effects of incidental bycatch
