= Geep Pond =

Pond on Bird Island, South Georgia

- Location within South Georgia Island
- Location: Bird Island, South Georgia
- Coordinates: 54.0101°S 38.0688°W
- Primary outflows: Payne Creek (Antarctica)
- Basin countries: South Georgia and the South Sandwich Islands

Geep Pond is a pond on Bird Island in the South Georgia archipelago. It is west of Stejneger Peak in Bottom Meadow and drains into Payne Creek.

In 2012, the UK Antarctic Place-Names Committee named it onomatopoetically, deriving it from the English acronym "GP", thus referencing the local population of giant petrel.
