= Molly Hill =

Hill on western Bird Island, South Georgia

Molly Hill (54°1′S 38°4′W) is a hill between Evermann Cove and Johnson Cove on western Bird Island, South Georgia, an island in the southern Atlantic Ocean. The name derives from the black-browed albatross or "mollymawk" (Diomedea melanophris) which breeds on the hill in large numbers. According to the UK Antarctic Place-Names Committee, the name has been in local usage since at least 1963.

Another Molly Hill is on The Razorback, a ridge to the south of the summit pyramid of Mount Feathertop, Victoria, Australia. It was named after Molly Hill, a skier who died nearby in September 1932. A cairn with a memorial plaque is near the top of the hill.
