= Freshwater Inlet =

Body of water in Antarctica

Freshwater Inlet (54°0′S 38°3′W) is the small eastern arm of Jordan Cove on the south side of Bird Island, South Georgia, with Wanderer Valley to the southwest. It was charted by the South Georgia Survey in the period 1951–57 and was named in 1956 by W.N. Bonner, a British government biologist and sealing inspector, because the feature is fed by freshwater streams.
