= Île des Pingouins =

Fourth largest of the Crozet Islands

Nickname: Penguin Island
- Map of the island
- Interactive map of Île des Pingouins

Geography
- Location: South Indian Ocean
- Coordinates: 46°25′01″S 50°24′10″E
- Archipelago: Crozet Islands
- Area: 3 km^{2} (1.2 sq mi)
- Length: 4 km (2.5 mi)
- Width: 1 km (0.6 mi)
- Highest elevation: 340 m (1120 ft)
- Highest point: Mont des Manchots

Administration
- France

Demographics
- Population: 0

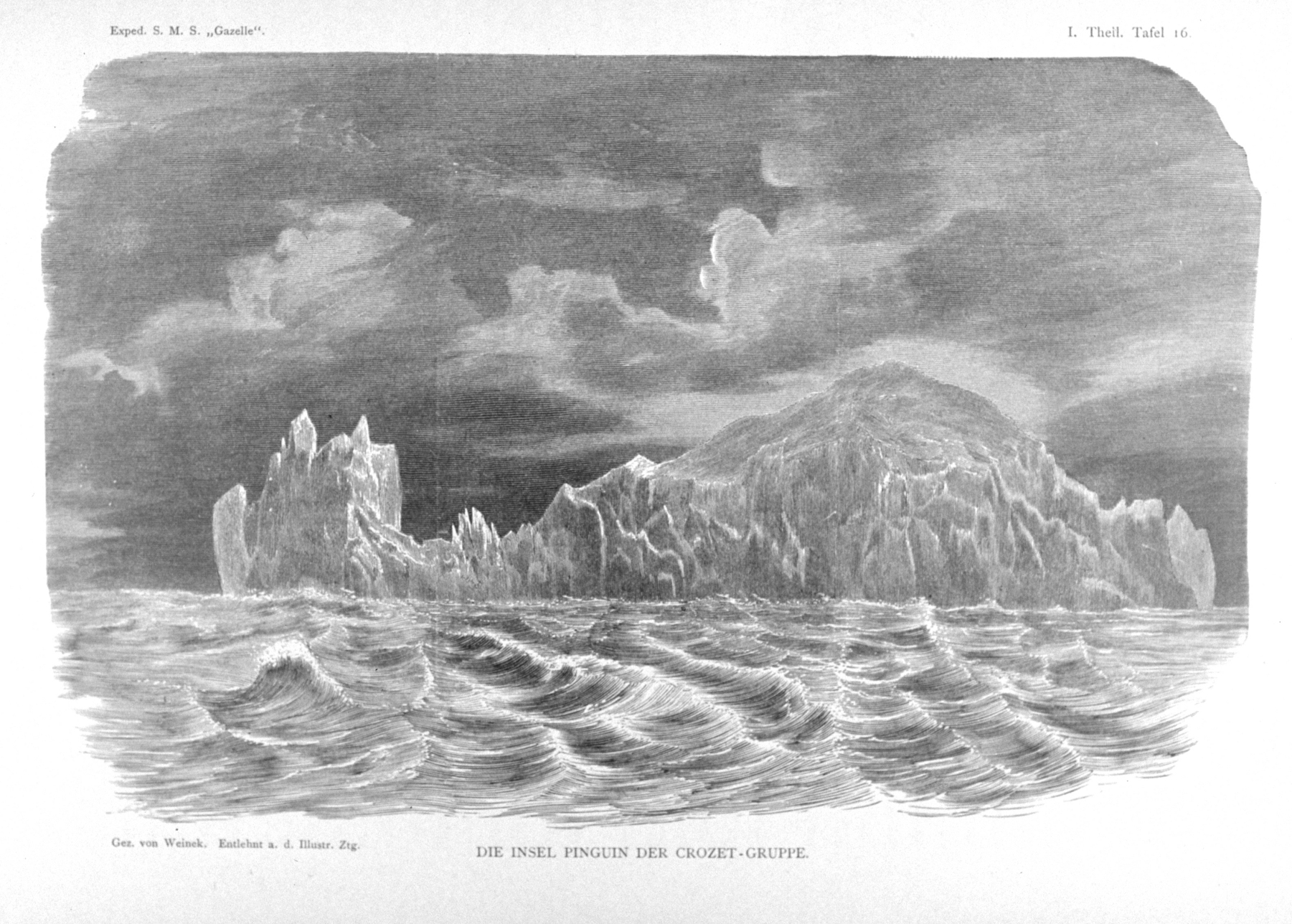
1874 sketch of the island by Dr Ladislaus Weinek

Île des Pingouins (French pronunciation: [il de pɛ̃ɡwɛ̃]), or Penguin Island, is an uninhabited island in the subantarctic Crozet Archipelago of the southern Indian Ocean. With an area of only 3 km^{2} (1 sq mi) it is one of the smaller islands of the group. Administratively, it is part of the French Southern and Antarctic Lands. It is an important nesting site for seabirds.

== Description ==
Île des Pingouins lies at the western edge of the archipelago, of which it is the southernmost island, about 30 km southeast of Île aux Cochons (Pig Island) and 95 km west-southwest of Île de la Possession (Possession Island). It is small, much eroded by the sea, steep-sided, 4 km long and 1 km wide.

Its surrounding coastal cliffs vary from 50 m to 300 m in height, making it virtually inaccessible by sea and rarely visited. It is free of introduced species, so has a relatively pristine biota compared with the other islands in the archipelago.

== Important Bird Area ==
At least 29 bird species breed on the island, which has been identified by BirdLife International as an Important Bird Area (IBA). It has an exceptionally high density of seabirds, including a million pairs of macaroni penguins, 300 pairs of black-browed albatrosses, four pairs of Salvin's albatrosses (for which it is the only breeding site in the Indian Ocean) and 30 pairs of light-mantled albatrosses, as well as several thousand pairs of medium-billed prions and white-chinned petrels.

Other birds nesting in relatively large numbers include wandering, sooty, grey-headed and Indian yellow-nosed albatrosses, northern giant petrels, blue and Kerguelen petrels, and common diving petrels. Other island breeders in smaller numbers are Kerguelen terns and Crozet blue-eyed shags.

== See also ==
- List of Antarctic islands north of 60° S
