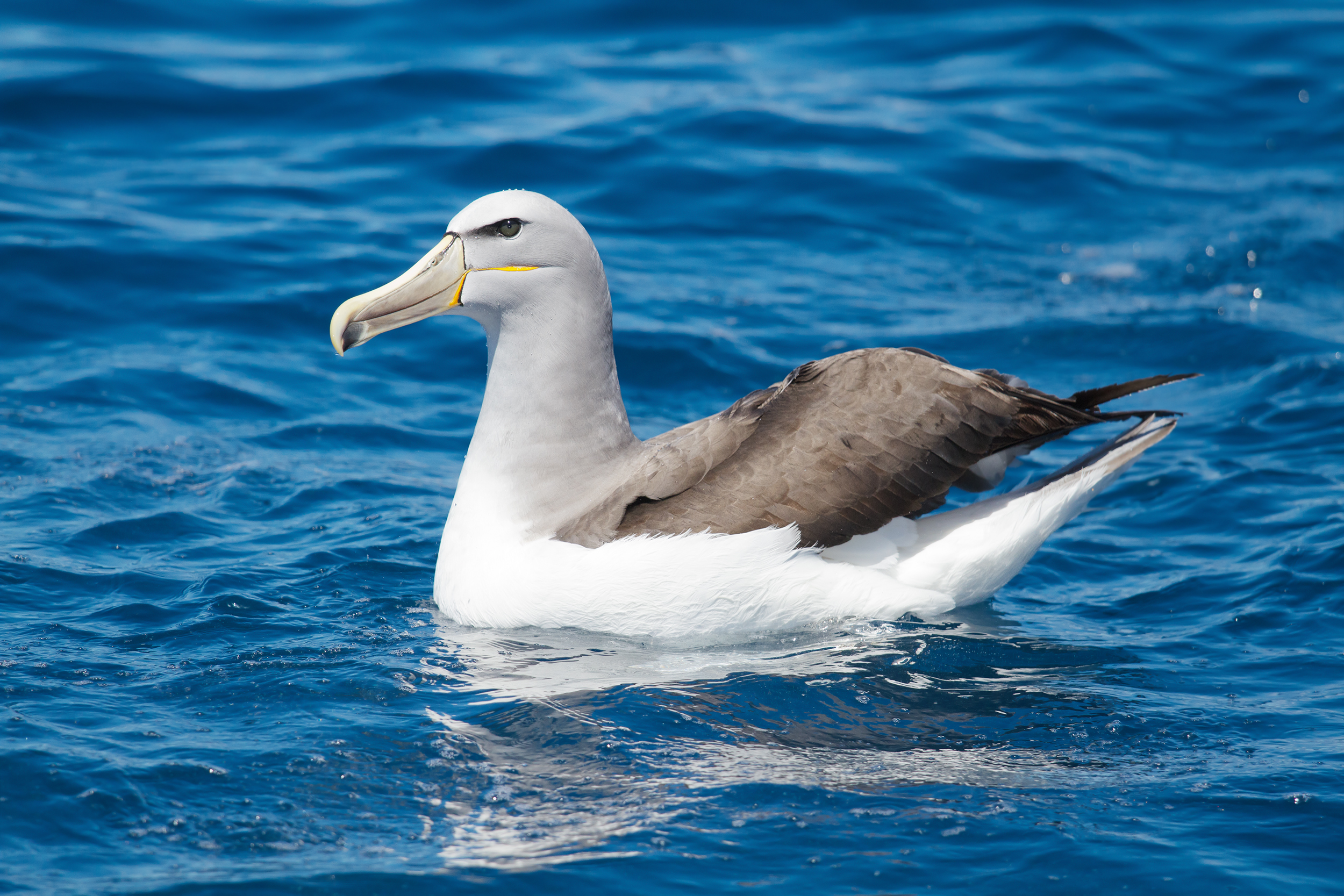

Conservation status
- Vulnerable (IUCN 3.1)

Scientific classification
- Kingdom: Animalia
- Phylum: Chordata
- Class: Aves
- Order: Procellariiformes
- Family: Diomedeidae
- Genus: Thalassarche
- Species: T. salvini

Binomial name
- Thalassarche salvini (Rothschild, 1893)

Synonyms
- Thalassarche cauta salvini

= Salvin's albatross =

Species of bird

Salvin's albatross (Thalassarche salvini) or Salvin's mollymawk is a large seabird that breeds mainly on the Bounty Islands of New Zealand, with scant amounts on islands across the Southern Ocean. A medium-sized mollymawk, it was long considered to be a subspecies of the shy albatross.

== Taxonomy ==
Mollymawks are a type of albatross that belong to the family Diomedeidae in the order Procellariiformes, along with shearwaters, fulmars, storm petrels, and diving petrels. They share certain identifying features. First, they have nasal passages that attach to the upper bill called naricorns. Although the nostrils on the albatross are on the sides of the bill, unlike other tubenosed seabirds. The bills of Procellariiformes are also unique in that they are split into between seven and nine horny plates. They produce a stomach oil made up of wax esters and triglycerides that is stored in the proventriculus. This is used against predators as well as an energy rich food source for chicks and for the adults during their long flights. Finally, they have a salt gland that is situated above the nasal passage and helps desalinate their bodies, due to the high amount of ocean water that they imbibe. It excretes a high saline solution from their nose.

Salvin's albatross, white-capped albatross, shy albatross and Chatham albatross were all considered the same species until a 1998 article by Robertson and Nunn. Other experts followed suit, with BirdLife International in 2000, Brooke in 2004, ACAP in 2006, and SACC in 2008. Some, however, like James Clements (at the time of his death) did not agree, nor has Cornell University since (which is responsible for his book). Molecular analysis has shown that it and the closely related Chatham albatross (also considered to be a subspecies of the shy albatross) are sister taxa, and more distantly related to the shy.

== Etymology ==
The species was named by Lord Lionel Walter Rothschild for the distinguished ornithologist Osbert Salvin.

== Description ==
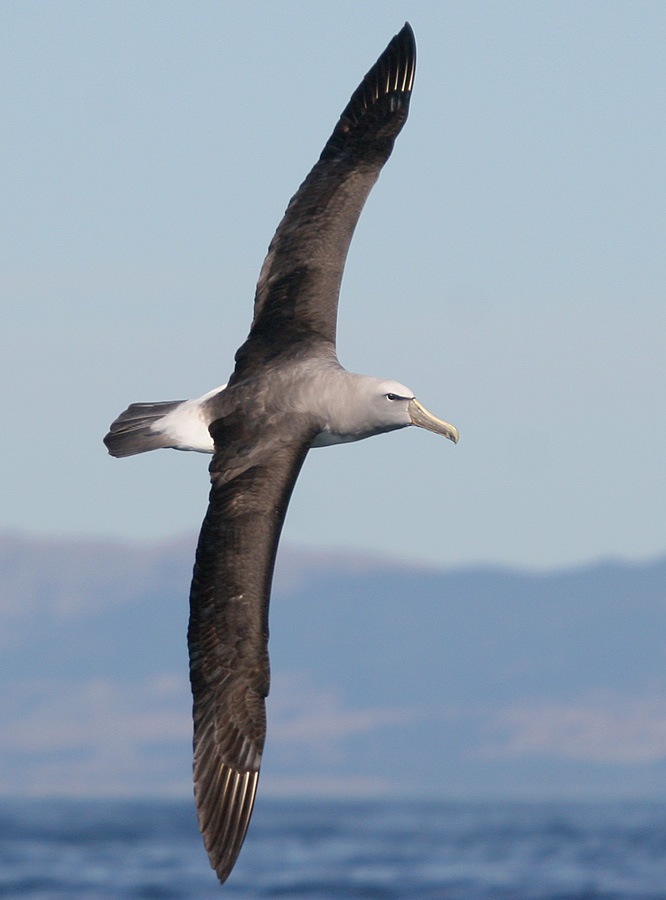
In flight

Salvin's albatross is about 90 cm (35 in) and 2.56 m (8.4 ft) across the wings. It weighs 3.3–4.9 kg (7.3–10.8 lb) and is, alongside the shy albatross, the largest of the mollymawk or small albatross group. The adult bird has a silver-grey crown. Its face, upper throat, and upper mantle are grey, and its back, upperwing, and tail are grey-black. It has a white rump and underparts with a black thumbmark on underwing and black narrow leading and trailing edges on the wing and black wing tips. Its bill is pale grey-green with a pale yellow upper ridge, and a bright yellow tip on the upper mandible, and a dark spot on the tip of the lower mandible. The juveniles have more extensive grey areas and a blue-grey bill with black tips on both mandibles. It can be distinguished from the Chatham albatross by its larger size and grey bill, and from the shy albatross by the greyer head. Such differences can be difficult to pick out at sea, however, and this explains the under-representation of this species in at-sea surveys.

== Behavior ==
=== Feeding ===
Salvin's albatross feeds mainly on fish and cephalopods.

=== Reproduction ===
It breeds mainly on small rocky islands with little vegetation, and the nest is a pedestal made of mud, feathers, and bird bones. A single egg is laid in September, and incubated by both parents until early November. The chicks fledge after about 4 months.

== Range and habitat ==
Breeding Population and Trends
| Location | Population | Date | Trend |
| Bounty Islands | 30,750 pairs | 1998 | Possibly declining |
| Western Chain Islets, Snares Islands | < 650 pairs | 1984 |
| The Pyramid, Chatham Islands | 2 pairs | 2006 |
| Forty-Fours | 1+ pairs | 2007 |
| Île des Pingouins, Crozet Islands | 1—4 pairs | 2002 |
| Total | 62,000 | 1998 | Possibly declining |

Salvin's albatross breed colonially on three disparate island groups in the Southern Ocean, Île des Pingouins in the Crozet Islands in the Indian Ocean and the Bounty Islands and The Snares to the south of New Zealand, as well as The Pyramid and Forty-Fours Island of the Chatham Islands.

At sea they range from South Africa across to Australia and as far east as the coast of South America. In the early 2000s, an adult Salvin's albatross was seen by a fisheries observer 700–800mi north of the Hawaiian islands. This sighting was supported by a photograph.

== Conservation ==
The IUCN classifies this species as vulnerable with longline fisheries and trawlers responsible for small numbers of deaths, although trawlers are responsible for more than half of those killed. The world population is currently estimated to be around 61,500 birds in 1998, which suggests a decline in the species since earlier studies (although differences in methods make direct comparisons difficult). There are 30,750 pairs, in 1998, on the Bounty Islands, compared to 76,000 pairs in 1978. There were 650 pairs on the Snares Islands, and 4 pairs were recorded on Île des Pingouins in the Crozet Islands. Single chicks have been observed on The Pyramid and Forty-fours Island in 2007.

Bird banding and studies are underway, and all of the islands except for The Pyramid, and Forty-fours Island, which are privately owned, are nature preserves. In 1998, the Snares Islands and Bounty Islands were declared World Heritage Sites, and in 2006, the Western and Central Pacific Fisheries Commission adopted a measure to require bird bycatch mitigation measures south of 30°S.
