= Shoemaker Point =

Geographical feature in Antarctica

Shoemaker Point (54°1′S 38°2′W) is a point 0.5 miles (0.8 km) east of Jordan Cove on the south side of Bird Island, South Georgia, just south of Sooty Cove. Surveyed by the SGS in the period 1951-57 and named by the United Kingdom Antarctic Place-Names Committee (UK-APC) in 1963. "Shoemaker" is an old sailors' name for the Cape hen (Procellaria aequinoctialis), a bird which breeds on Bird Island.
