= Stejneger Peak =

Mountain in South Georgia

Stejneger Peak (54°0′S 38°4′W) is a conspicuous rocky peak, 190 m, at the head of Evermann Cove on Bird Island, South Georgia. Surveyed by the South Georgia Biological Expedition, 1958–59. Named by the United Kingdom Antarctic Place-Names Committee (UK-APC) in 1960 for Leonhard Stejneger (1851–1943), American zoologist who made important investigations of fur seals and birds in the islands of the Bering Sea at the end of the 19th century; member of the Joint British-American Commission for Fur Seal Investigation in the Bering Sea, 1896.
