= Wanderer Valley =

Geographical feature in Antarctica

Wanderer Valley (54°0′S 38°3′W) is a valley in central Bird Island, South Georgia. The valley extends northeast for 0.5 nautical miles (0.9 km) from the head of Freshwater Inlet. It was named by the United Kingdom Antarctic Place-Names Committee (UK-APC) after the wandering albatross (Diomedea exulans) whose principal breeding grounds are nearby.

== Sources ==
- Alberts, Fred G., ed. (1995), Geographic Names of the Antarctic (PDF) (2 ed.), United States Board on Geographic Names This article incorporates public domain material from websites or documents of the United States Board on Geographic Names.
