= Milward Patch =

Coordinates: 53°59′S 38°1′W

Milward Patch is a large patch of kelp 1 nautical mile (2 km) north of the eastern part of Bird Island, off the western tip of South Georgia. It was charted in 1930, along with other navigational hazards, by Discovery Investigations personnel on the William Scoresby, and named for C.A. Milward, Chief Officer of the ship at the time of the survey.
