= Owen Shoals =

Owen Shoals (53°58′S 38°7′W) is an area of shoals 2.5 nautical miles (4.6 km) northwest of the northwest extremity of Bird Island, South Georgia. Named by the United Kingdom Antarctic Place-Names Committee (UK-APC) after HMS Owen, which surveyed the feature in 1960–61.
