= Evermann Cove =

Evermann Cove (54°1′S 38°4′W) is a cove 0.2 nautical miles (0.4 km) long, lying just southwest of Jordan Cove along the south side of Bird Island, South Georgia. It was surveyed by the South Georgia Biological Expedition, 1958–59, and was named by the UK Antarctic Place-Names Committee in 1960 for Barton W. Evermann, an American zoologist on the staff of the United States Fish Commission from 1891 to 1903 and its successor, the United States Bureau of Fisheries, from 1903 to 1914, and a specialist in administrative and legal problems relating to the fur seal.
