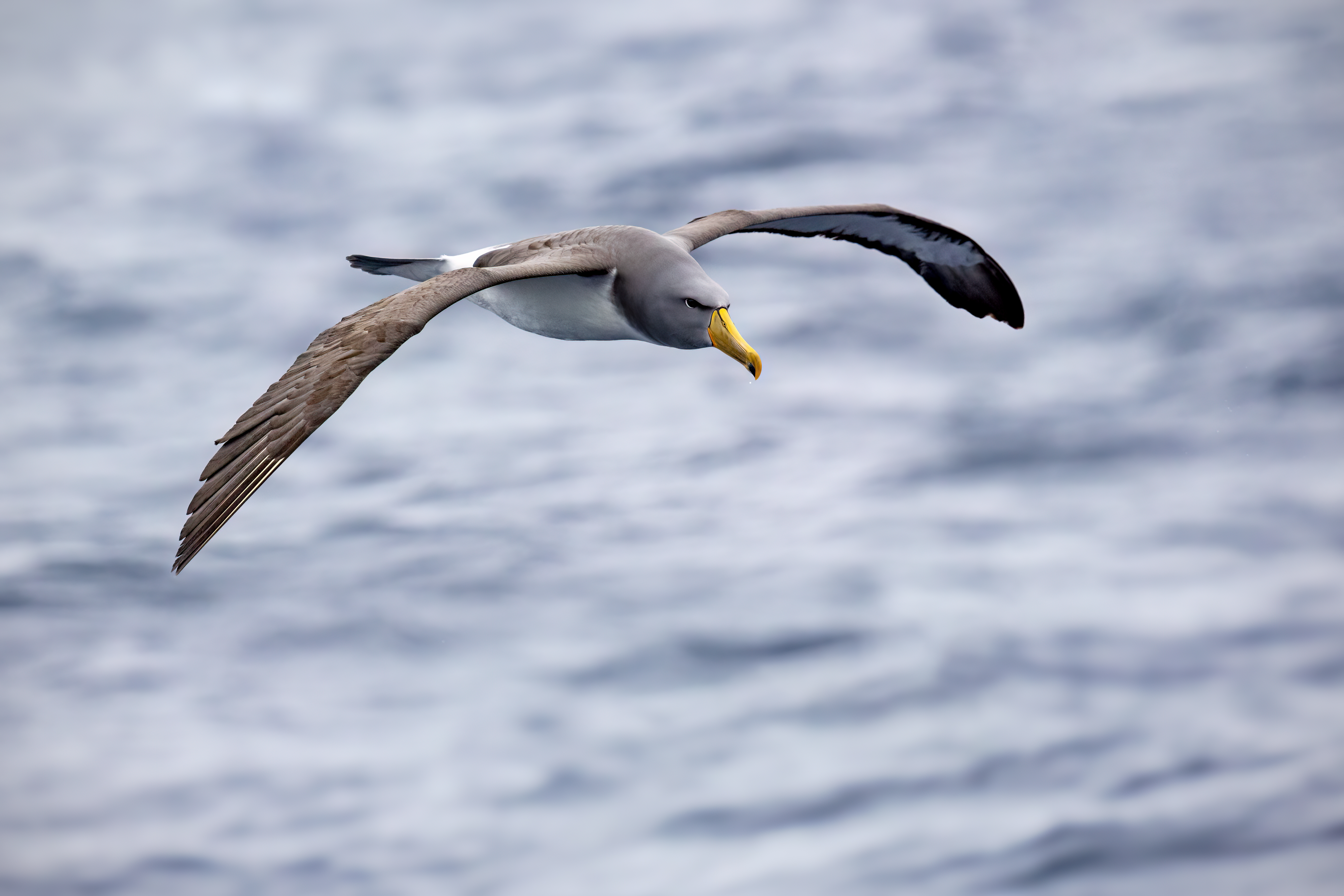

Conservation status
- Vulnerable (IUCN 3.1)

Scientific classification
- Kingdom: Animalia
- Phylum: Chordata
- Class: Aves
- Order: Procellariiformes
- Family: Diomedeidae
- Genus: Thalassarche
- Species: T. eremita

Binomial name
- Thalassarche eremita Murphy, 1930

Synonyms
- Thalassarche cauta eremita; Diomedea cauta eremita

= Chatham albatross =

Species of marine bird

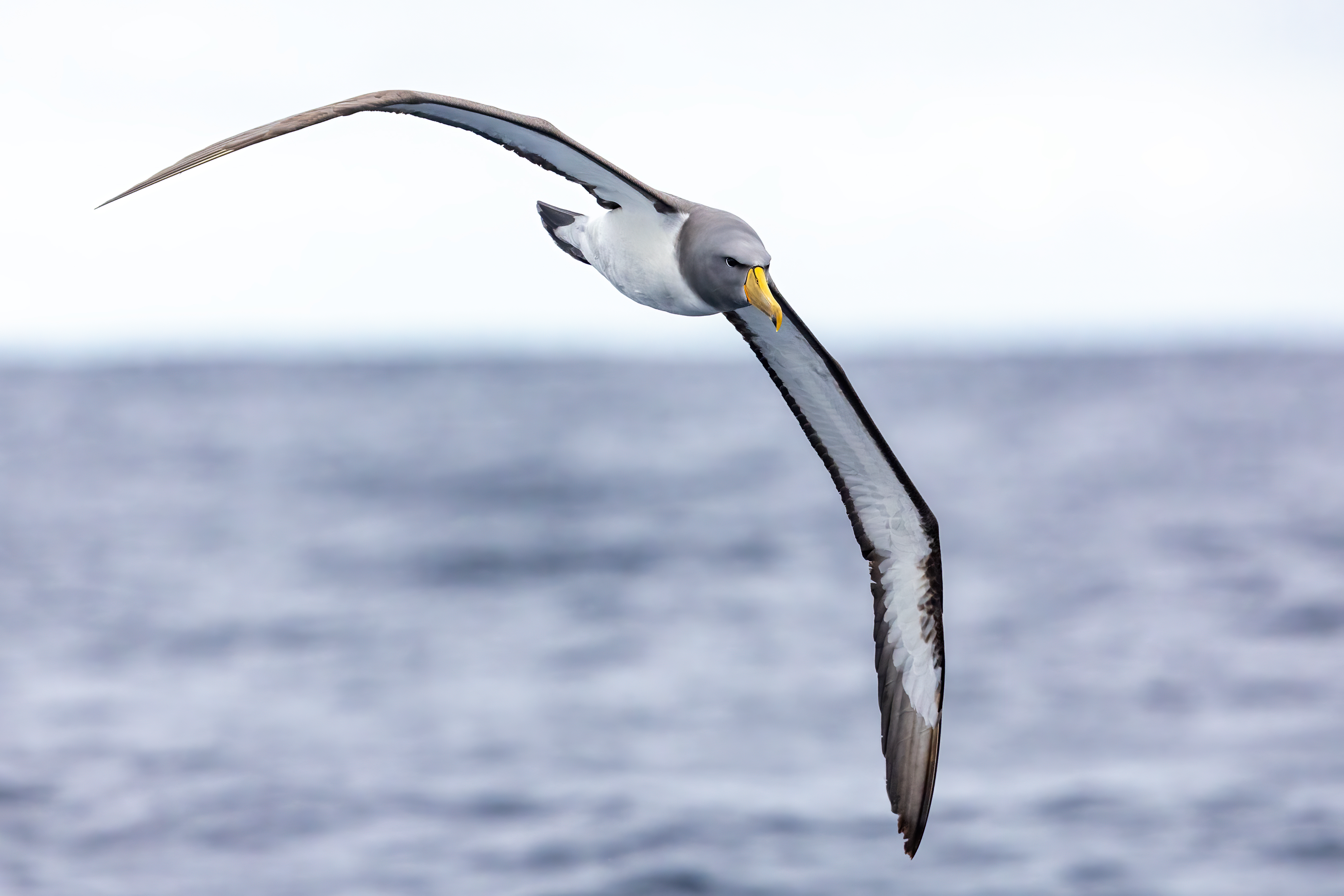
Eaglehawk Neck, Tasmania

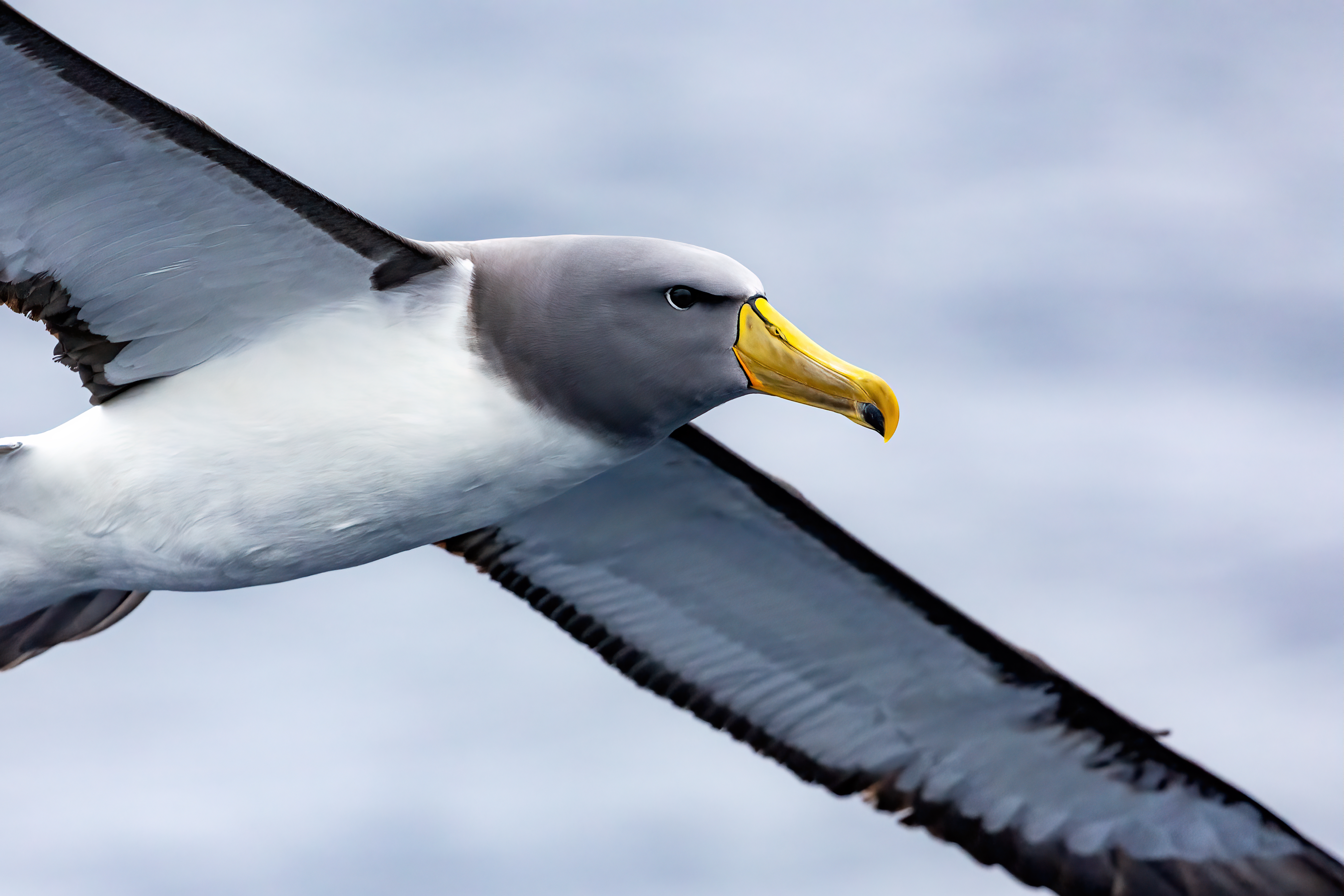
Eaglehawk Neck, Tasmania

The Chatham albatross (Thalassarche eremita), also known as the Chatham mollymawk or Chatham Island mollymawk, is a medium-sized black-and-white albatross which breeds only on The Pyramid, a large rock stack in the Chatham Islands, New Zealand. It is sometimes treated as a subspecies of the shy albatross (Thalassarche cauta). It is the smallest of the shy albatross group.

== Taxonomy ==
Mollymawks are a type of albatross that belong to family Diomedeidae of the order Procellariiformes, along with shearwaters, fulmars, storm petrels, and diving petrels. They share certain identifying features. First, they have nasal passages that attach to the upper bill called naricorns. Although the nostrils on the albatross are on the sides of the bill. The bills of Procellariiformes are also unique in that they are split into between seven and nine horny plates. Finally, they produce a stomach oil made up of wax esters and triglycerides that is stored in the proventriculus. This is used against predators as well as an energy rich food source for chicks and for the adults during their long flights. They also have a salt gland that is situated above the nasal passage and helps desalinate their bodies, due to the high amount of ocean water that they imbibe. It excretes a high saline solution from their nose.

The Chatham albatross, with the white-capped, shy and Salvin's albatrosses, were all considered the same species until a 1998 book by Robertson and Nunn. Other experts followed suit, with BirdLife International in 2000, Brooke in 2004, ACAP in 2006, and SACC in 2008. Though some, such as James Clements, did not agree.

The Chatham albatross was first described as Diomedea cauta eremita by Robert Cushman Murphy, in 1930, based on a specimen from Pyramid Rock.

== Description ==
The Chatham albatross is a mid sized albatross, weighing 3.1 to 4.7 kg (6.8–10.4 lb) and it has a length of 90 cm (35 in). The adult has a dark grey crown, face, upper mantle, back, upperwing, tail, and throat. They have a white rump and underparts. They also have a black thumbmark on the leading edge of the underwings, and a black tip on the wings. Their bill is yellow with a dark spot on the tip of the lower mandible. Finally, they have an orange cheek stripe. The juveniles have more extensive grey and their bill is blue-grey with black tips on both mandibles.

== Behaviour ==
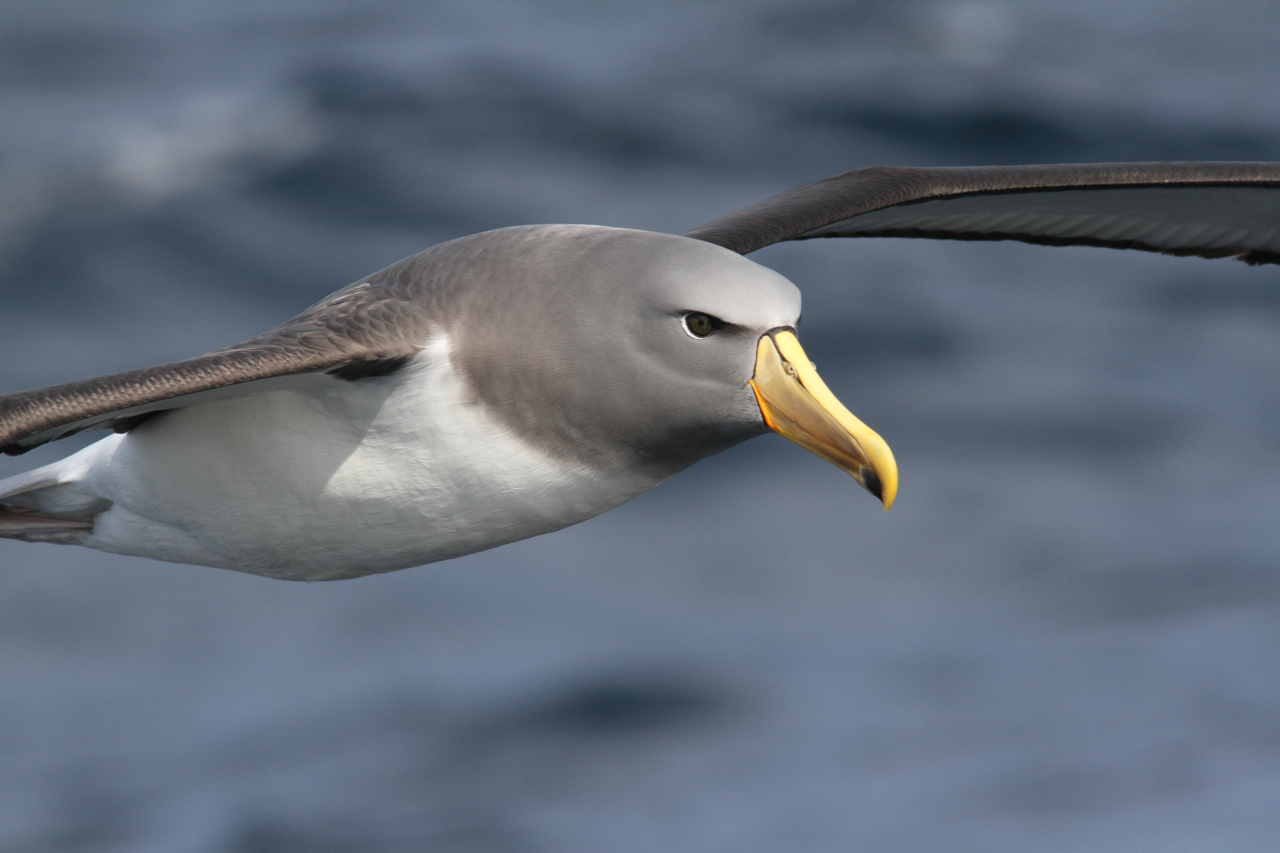

They are normally silent, but will emit a harsh buzzing bray when threatened and also during courtship. Besides the sound they will put on a courtship display which includes fanning of the tail, mutual jousting of bills, and grunting.

=== Feeding ===
The Chatham albatross feeds on fish, cephalopods, krill, and barnacles.

=== Reproduction ===
This species of albatross breeds annually on rocky ledges, steep slopes, and crevices. They build pedestal nests of soil and vegetation. At this time The Pyramid is their only breeding site. They lay their single egg between 20 August and 1 October, with the egg hatching in November or December, after 68–72 days. Eggs of this species measure 10 cm × 6.7 cm (3.9 in × 2.6 in). The chicks fledge by March or April, or 130 to 140 days after hatching. Juveniles return to the colony after four years, but do not breed until their seventh year.

== Range and habitat ==
Breeding Population and Trends
Location	Population	Date	Trend
The Pyramid, Chatham Islands	5,300 pair	2003	Stable
Total	11,000	2003	Stable

The Chatham albatross nests only on The Pyramid in the Chatham Islands. Using aerial photography, in 1998, scientists estimated that there were between 3,200 and 4,200 pairs nesting. Ground counts from 1999 to 2003 increased this number to 5,300 pairs for a total of approximately 11,000 breeding age birds. When not breeding they range in the South Pacific from Tasmania to Chile and Peru. From April to July they will utilize the Humboldt Current and go as far north as 6°S along the South American coast.

== Conservation ==
The IUCN has classified this species as Vulnerable, due to the fact that they nest on one small island, which has undergone significant decline in habitat condition. In 1985 a severe storm impacted the island by reducing the amount of vegetation. The conditions have been improving since 1998. As with other albatrosses, commercial fishing impacts their survival, with longline and the occasional trawl line. Illegal harvesting of chicks occurs occasionally.

In 2014, the Chatham Islands Taiko Trust translocated 50 juvenile albatrosses to a protected breeding site on Main Chatham Island, some 50 km (31 mi) north of the Pyramid. It was hoped that a new colony could be established within five years which would give the species a chance to thrive in less extreme conditions. In total 300 chicks were translocated over the period 2014 to 2018. Each day during the period of the project, 60KG of a squid and fish mixture was prepared, warmed and fed, to the chicks by volunteers of the Chatham Island Taiko Trust. The success or the translocation project is not yet confirmed. The birds, once they depart the colony, spend five to seven years at sea. If the birds return to nest on the new location this will provide an indication of the projects' success.
