= Agreement on the Conservation of Albatrosses and Petrels =

2001 international agreement

- Logo of the Conservation of Albatrosses and Petrels
- Abbreviation: ACAP
- Formation: 1 February 2004 (22 years ago)
- Type: International organization
- Purpose: Conservation
- Location: Hobart, Tasmania, Australia
- Coordinates: 42.883394°S 147.329126°E
- Region served: International
- Members: 13 state members
- Executive Secretary: Jonathon Barrington
- Website: acap.aq

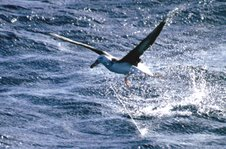
Black-browed Albatross hooked on a long-line.

The Agreement on the Conservation of Albatrosses and Petrels (ACAP) is a legally binding international agreement signed in 2001 and entered into force on 1 February 2004 when South Africa ratified as the fifth Party to the Agreement.

It was created in order to halt the drastic decline of seabird populations in the Southern Hemisphere, particularly of albatrosses and petrels. Albatrosses and petrels are threatened by introduced species on their breeding islands, pollution, and by being taken as bycatch by longline fisheries, as well as by trawl and gillnet fisheries. The Agreement requires that measures be taken by signatory governments to reduce bycatch; protect breeding colonies; and control and remove introduced species from breeding sites, especially on islands.

Currently, ACAP protects all the world's albatross species, seven Southern Hemisphere petrel species and two shearwater species. The ongoing work of the Agreement reflects an increasing international commitment to protect albatrosses and petrels.

== Organization ==
The Executive Secretary of ACAP is Christine Bogle, who is supported by a Science Officer, Wiesława Misiak, and an honorary Information Officer, John Cooper. The Secretariat is located at 119 Macquarie Street, Hobart in the state of Tasmania, Australia.

The Agreement entered into force on 1 February 2004. National representatives of the Parties meet regularly. Six Meetings of the Parties have been held. The seventh will be held in Australia during 2022.

Location	Date
Hobart, Australia	10-12 November 2004
Christchurch, New Zealand	13-17 November 2006
Bergen, Norway	27 April - 1 May 2009
Lima, Peru	23-27 April 2012
Santa Cruz de Tenerife, Spain	4-8 May 2015
Skukuza, South Africa	7-11 May 2018

Eleven meetings of ACAP's Advisory Committee have been held to date, the last in Florianópolis, Brazil from 13 to 17 May 2019. The Advisory Committee is currently supported by three working groups for Taxonomy, Seabird Bycatch, and Population and Conservation Status.

Meeting agendas, final reports and submitted documents and information papers may be downloaded from the Agreement's website at www.acap.aq.

Due to travel restrictions caused by the COVID-19 pandemic ACAP Parties have decided to postpone the next meeting of the Advisory Committee (AC12) and of its Working Groups (SBWG10 and PaCSWG6) to 2021, to be held in Ecuador.

The Agreement's activities are funded from a modest budget stemming mainly from assessed contributions by the Parties. As well as supporting the Secretariat and annual meetings, funds are used to support conservation activities, including the Small Grants and Secondment Programmes.

== Provisions ==
ACAP helps countries to implement species action plans, control the expansion of non-native predators, introduce measures reducing bycatch of seabirds, and support research in the sphere of the effective conservation of petrels and albatrosses. To this end it has published ACAP Species Assessments, booklets, mitigation factsheets, and a number of ACAP Conservation Guidelines, including for biosecurity; eradication of introduced mammals; translocation; and census and survey methods.

One of the Agreement's main activities is to provide expert advice on seabird bycatch mitigation to fisheries managers, both in domestic and high seas fisheries.

In May 2019 the ACAP Advisory Committee declared that a conservation crisis continues to be faced by its 31 listed species, with thousands of albatrosses, petrels and shearwaters dying every year as a result of fisheries operations. To increase awareness of this crisis ACAP has inaugurated a World Albatross Day, to be held annually from 2020 on 19 June, the date the Agreement was signed in 2001.

== Species covered by the Agreement ==
The following 31 species of albatrosses, petrels and shearwaters are listed by the Agreement.

Albatrosses

- Northern Royal Albatross (Diomedea sanfordi)
- Southern Royal Albatross (Diomedea epomophora)
- Wandering Albatross (Diomedea exulans)
- Antipodean Albatross (Diomedea antipodensis)
- Amsterdam Albatross (Diomedea amsterdamensis)
- Tristan Albatross (Diomedea dabbenena)
- Sooty Albatross (Phoebetria fusca)
- Light-mantled Albatross (Phoebetria palpebrata)
- Waved Albatross (Phoebastria irrorata)
- Short-tailed Albatross (Phoebastria albatrus)
- Laysan Albatross (Phoebastria immutabilis)
- Black-footed Albatross (Phoebastria nigripes)
- Atlantic Yellow-nosed Albatross (Thalassarche chlororhynchos)
- Indian Yellow-nosed Albatross (Thalassarche carteri)
- Grey-headed Albatross (Thalassarche chrysostoma)
- Black-browed Albatross (Thalassarche melanophris)
- Campbell Albatross (Thalassarche impavida)
- Buller's Albatross (Thalassarche bulleri)
- Shy Albatross (Thalassarche cauta)
- White-capped Albatross (Thalassarche steadi)
- Chatham Albatross (Thalassarche eremita)
- Salvin's Albatross (Thalassarche salvini)

Petrels and shearwaters

- Southern Giant Petrel (Macronectes giganteus)
- Northern Giant Petrel (Macronectes halli)
- White-chinned Petrel (Procellaria aequinoctialis)
- Spectacled Petrel (Procellaria conspicillata)
- Black Petrel (Procellaria parkinsoni)
- Westland Petrel (Procellaria westlandica)
- Grey Petrel (Procellaria cinerea)
- Balearic Shearwater (Puffinus mauretanicus)
- Pink-footed Shearwater (Ardenna creatopus)

== Member states ==
The following 13 countries are Parties to the Agreement:

- Argentina
- Australia
- Brazil
- Chile
- Ecuador
- France
- New Zealand
- Norway
- Peru
- South Africa
- Spain
- United Kingdom
- Uruguay

Canada, Namibia and the United States of America regularly send observer delegations to ACAP meetings, but have not as yet acceded to the Agreement. Japan and Mexico have sent delegations to meetings in some years. Chinese Taipei has attended as a member economy of the Asia Pacific Economic Forum. Any Range State or regional economic integration organisation may become a Party to the Agreement by accession. The term ‘Range State’ refers to a State with jurisdiction over any part of the range of albatrosses or petrels, or a State whose flag vessels are outside its national jurisdictional limits and either take or have the potential to take albatrosses and petrels.

Both international and national non-governmental organizations (NGOs) may apply to attend ACAP meetings as observers.

== See also ==
- Bonn Convention
