= Goldcrest Point =

Geographical feature in Antarctica

Goldcrest Point (54°0′S 38°5′W) is the northwest point of Bird Island, South Georgia, with Payne Creek just south of it. It was charted by Discovery Investigations personnel on the Discovery in the period 1926–30 and by the South Georgia Survey, 1951–57. The point is the site of a large colony of Macaroni penguins (Eudyptes chrysolophus). The name, given by the UK Antarctic Place-Names Committee in 1963, refers to the golden crests of this species.
