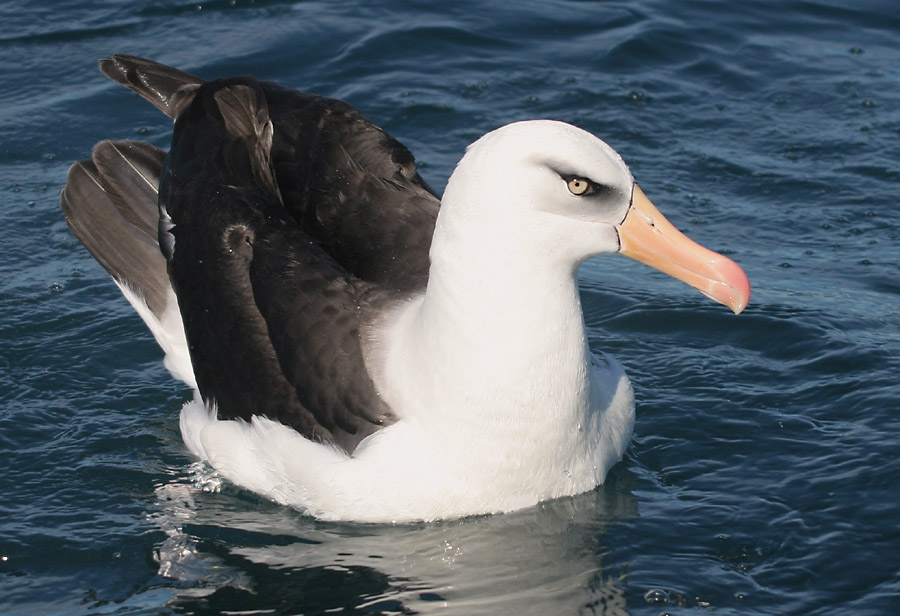

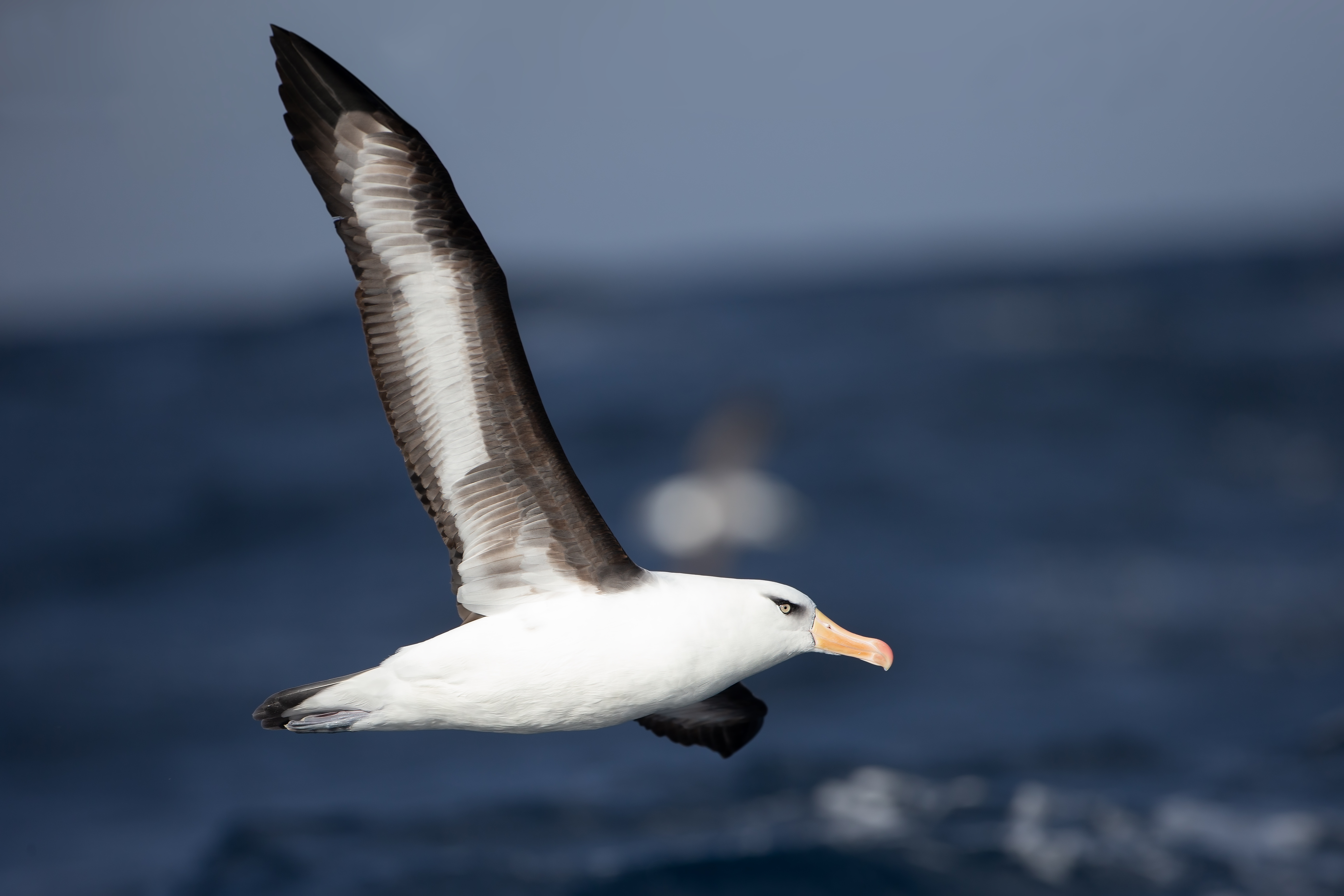

Conservation status
- Vulnerable (IUCN 3.1)

Scientific classification
- Kingdom: Animalia
- Phylum: Chordata
- Class: Aves
- Order: Procellariiformes
- Family: Diomedeidae
- Genus: Thalassarche
- Species: T. impavida

Binomial name
- Thalassarche impavida Mathews, 1912

Synonyms
- Thalassarche melanophris impavida Mahews, 1912

= Campbell albatross =

Species of bird

The Campbell albatross (Thalassarche impavida) or Campbell mollymawk is a medium-sized mollymawk in the albatross family. It breeds only on Campbell Island and the associated islet of Jeanette Marie, in a small New Zealand island group in the South Pacific. It is sometimes considered a subspecies of the black-browed albatross. It is a medium-sized black and white albatross with a pale yellow iris.

== Taxonomy ==
Mollymawks are a type of albatross that belong to family Diomedeidae of the order Procellariiformes, along with shearwaters, fulmars, storm petrels, and diving petrels. They share certain identifying features. First, they have nasal passages that attach to the upper bill called naricorns, although the nostrils on the albatross are on the sides of the bill. The bills of Procellariiformes are also unique in that they are split into between seven and nine horny plates. Finally, they produce a stomach oil made up of wax esters and triglycerides that is stored in the proventriculus. This is used against predators as well as an energy-rich food source for chicks and for the adults during their long flights. They also have a salt gland situated above the nasal passage which helps desalinate their bodies, necessary due to the high amount of ocean water that they imbibe. It excretes a high saline solution from their nose.

In 1998, Robertson and Nunn suggested the species be split off of the black-browed albatross, Thalassarche melanophrys. Over the course of the next few years more experts agreed, starting with BirdLife International in 2000, followed by Brooke in 2004. James Clements did not agree, the ACAP has not agreed yet, and SACC recognizes the need for a proposal.

== Description ==
It weighs 3.21 kg (7.1 lb) and is 88 cm (35 in) long. The adult is very similar to the black-browed albatross, differing in eye color. It has a white head, neck, rump, and underparts, with a black upperwing, back, and tail. The underwing is white with broad black edging. It has a black triangle around the eye that reaches the bill, which is yellow with an orange tip. They also have a pale yellow iris. The juveniles have a brown-grey bill with a black tip, dark eyes and less black on the underwing. The average life expectancy is given as 28 years, though this is likely due to lack of study as most albatross can live to well beyond 50 years.

== Range and habitat ==
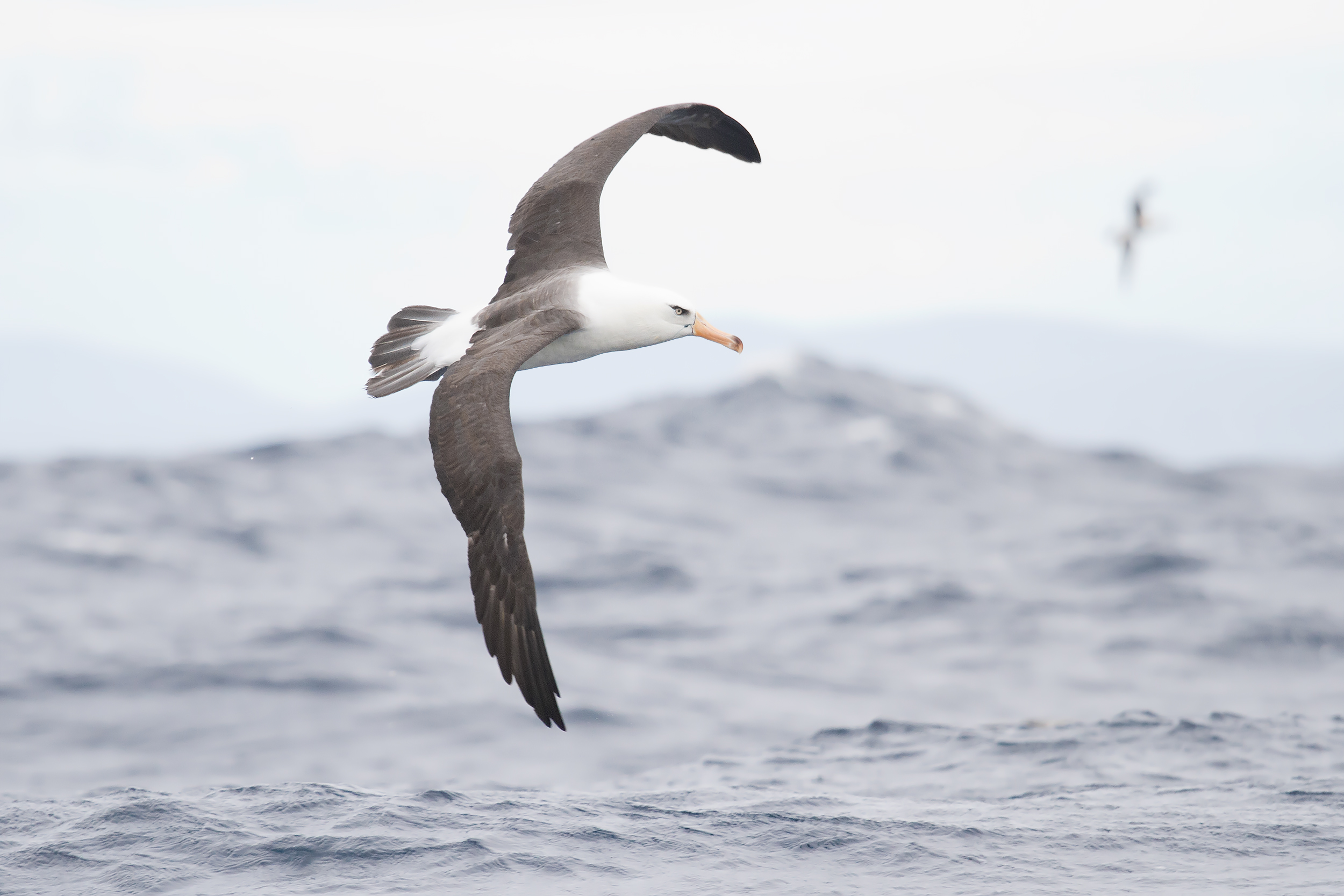
Juvenile

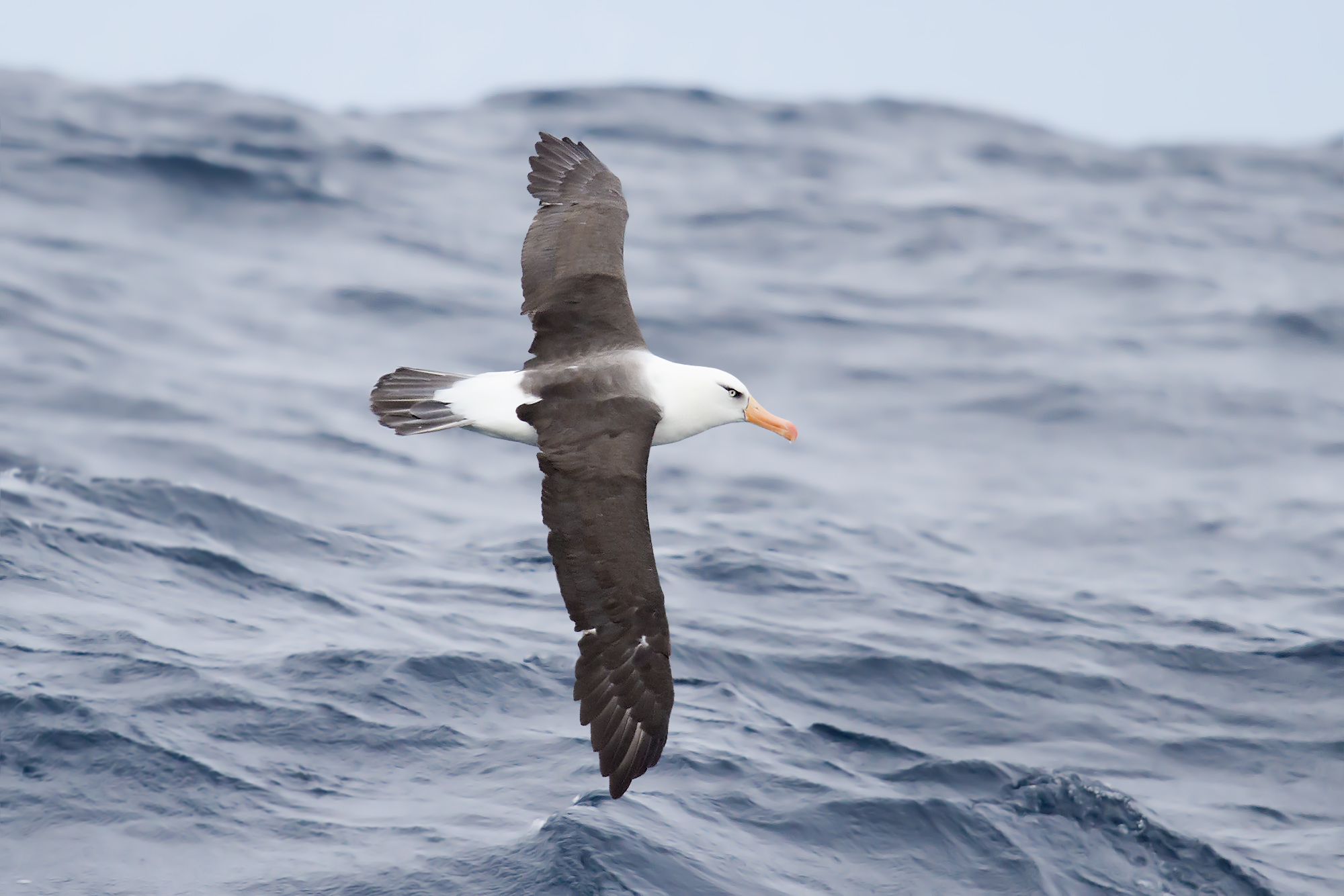
Adult in flight

Breeding population and trends
Location	Population	Date	Trend
Campbell Island & Jeanette Marie, Campbell Islands	24,600 pairs	1997	Increasing 1.8% yr
Total	49,000	1997	Increasing 1.8% per yr

The Campbell albatross breeds on the northern and western coastline of Campbell Island and the islet Jeanette Marie, part of the Campbell Islands group, one of New Zealand's five subantarctic island groups. When breeding they forage from South Island and the Chatham Rise to the Ross Sea. Juveniles and non-breeders will go only through south Australian water, the Tasman Sea, and southwestern Pacific Ocean.

== Behavior ==
=== Feeding ===
The Cambell albatross feeds on fish, squid, crustacea, carrion, and gelatinous organisms.

=== Reproduction ===
Breeding birds like to nest on ledges and steep slopes covered with low grass, tussock, or mud. They start breeding at 10 years and they have a breeding success rate of 66%. Adults return to the breeding colony in early August and begin laying in late September. The single egg is incubated for around 70 days. The chicks fledge after about 130 days after hatching.

== Conservation ==
The IUCN classifies this species as vulnerable due to the limited number of breeding locations. The most recent estimate was in 1997 and counted 24,600 pairs. Between 1992 and 1997 sampled colonies have been increasing at the rate of 1.8%. Adult survival rate is at 94.5%. It has an occurrence range of 31,700,000 km^{2} (12,200,000 sq mi) and a breeding range of 13 km^{2} (5.0 sq mi).

The largest threat to this species are fisheries, both longline and trawlers.

The feral sheep that existed on Campbell Island were fully eradicated by 1991, and rats and cats were eradicated by 2001. Finally, studies are ongoing.
