= Farewell Point =

Farewell Point (54°0′S 38°1′W) is a point which forms the northeast extremity of Bird Island, off the west end of South Georgia. The name appears to have been applied by Discovery Investigations personnel who charted South Georgia in the period 1926–30.
