= Morris Point =

Morris Point (54°1′S 38°4′W) is a point 0.5 nautical miles (1 km) east of Pearson Point on the south side of Bird Island, South Georgia. It was named by the UK Antarctic Place-Names Committee for Lieutenant (later Commander) Roger O. Morris, hydrographic officer in HMS Owen during survey of Stewart Strait and approaches in 1960–61.
