= Sooty Cove =

Body of water in Antarctica

Sooty Cove (54°1′S 38°2′W) is a small cove just north of Shoemaker Point along the south side of Bird Island, South Georgia. The name, applied by United Kingdom Antarctic Place-Names Committee (UK-APC), derives from the light-mantled sooty albatross (Phoebetria palpebrata) which breeds on the island.
