= Johnson Cove =

Johnson Cove (54°1′S 38°5′W) is a cove entered between Pio Point and Pearson Point on the west side of Bird Island, off the west end of South Georgia. The name appears to be first used in a 1948 British Admiralty pilot (navigation guide).
