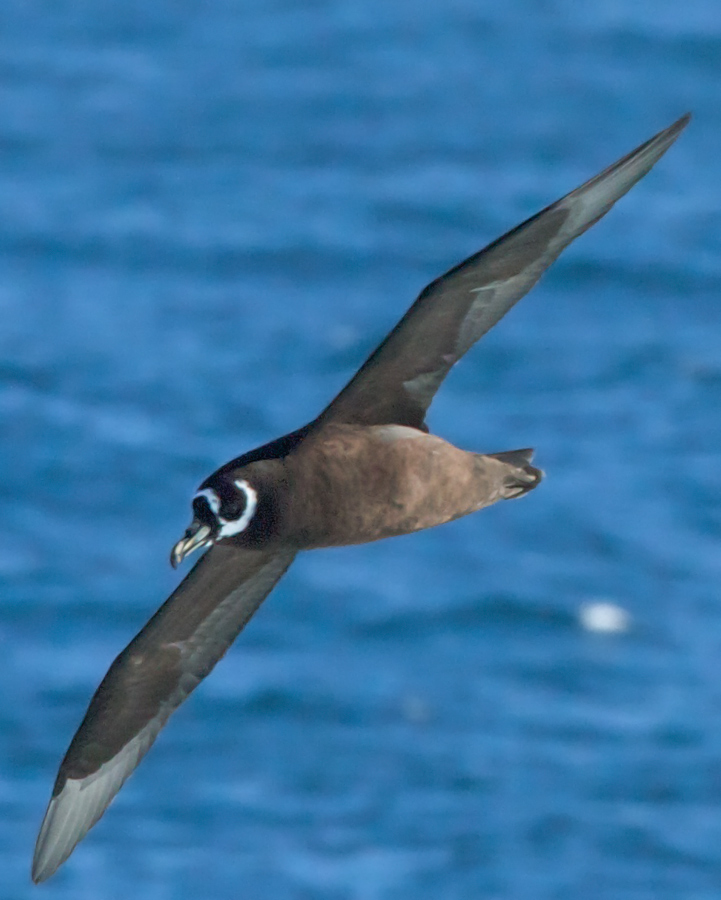

Conservation status
- Vulnerable (IUCN 3.1)

Scientific classification
- Kingdom: Animalia
- Phylum: Chordata
- Class: Aves
- Order: Procellariiformes
- Family: Procellariidae
- Genus: Procellaria
- Species: P. conspicillata

Binomial name
- Procellaria conspicillata Gould, 1844

Synonyms
- Procellaria aequinoctialis conspicillata

= Spectacled petrel =

Species of bird

The spectacled petrel (Procellaria conspicillata) is a rare seabird that nests only on the high western plateau of Inaccessible Island in the South Atlantic Tristan da Cunha group. It is one of the largest petrels that nests in burrows. This species was formerly considered to be a subspecies of the white-chinned petrel (Procellaria aequinoctialis).

== Taxonomy ==
The spectacled petrel was formally described in 1844 by the English ornithologist John Gould and given the binomial name Procellaria conspicillata. The genus Procellaria had been introduced in 1758 by the Swedish naturalist Carl Linnaeus in the tenth edition of his Systema Naturae. The genus name is from the Latin procella meaning "storm" or "gale". The specific epithet conspicillata is from Latin conspicillum meaning "place to look from" and hence "spectacled". The word petrel is derived from St. Peter and the story of his walking on water. This is in reference to the petrel's habit of appearing to run on the water to take off. The species is monotypic: no subspecies are recognised.

The genus Procellaria is a member of the family Procellariidae, and the order Procellariiformes. As a member of the Procellariiformes, they share certain identifying features. First, they have nasal passages that attach to the upper bill called naricorns. Although the nostrils on the petrel are on top of the upper bill. The bills of Procellariiformes are also unique in that they are split into between seven and nine horny plates. They produce a stomach oil made up of wax esters and triglycerides that is stored in the proventriculus. This can be sprayed out of their mouths as a defence against predators and as an energy rich food source for chicks and for the adults during their long flights. Finally, they also have a salt gland that is situated above the nasal passage and helps desalinate their bodies, due to the high amount of ocean water that they imbibe. It excretes a high saline solution from their nose.

The spectacled petrel was formerly often considered as a subspecies of the white-chinned petrel (Procellaria aequinoctialis). In 1998 the South African ornithologist Peter G. Ryan argued that the spectacled petrel should be considered as a separate species as the two taxa not only differed in their plumage but also in their vocalization. The spectacled petrel is slightly smaller, breeds earlier and the breeding site on Inaccessible Island is nearly 10 degrees further north than any breeding site of the white-chinned petrel. Following the publication of this article, the spectacled petrel had been treated as a separate species. Further justification for promoting the spectacled petrel to species status was provided by a molecular phylogenetic study published in 2009 that found significant differences in the DNA sequences of the mitochondrial cytochrome b gene.

== Description ==
The spectacled petrel is a large, approximately 55 cm (22 in) in length, predominately black petrel. It does have white bands around its eyes, and its bill is yellow. Their lifespan averages 26.4 years.

== Distribution and habitat ==
The spectacled petrel is pelagic and forages over a broad band of the south Atlantic Ocean between 30° and 50° south. Its range extends from southern Brazil in the west across to southern Africa in the east. It only breeds on Inaccessible Island which is part of the Tristan da Cunha archipelago in the South Atlantic. The spectacled petrel may have also once bred on Amsterdam Island in the south Indian Ocean.

== Behavior ==
=== Feeding ===
The spectacled petrel eats cephalopods, fish, and crustaceans.

=== Breeding ===
Spectacled petrels breed in burrows on the western plateau of Inaccessible Island. The birds dig the burrows in the banks of streams and in boggy areas. The clutch is a single white egg with an average size of 81 mm × 55 mm (3.2 in × 2.2 in) and a weight of 130 g (4.6 oz).

== Conservation ==
The species was classified as critically endangered by the IUCN in 2000. A subsequent study gave cautious hope for a continuing recovery of the population from an all-time low of merely some dozens of pairs in the 1930s. Indeed, it appears as if the species' numbers have been underestimated in more recent years as an accurate census is difficult due to the rugged terrain of its island home. Consequently, the conservation status of this species was downgraded to vulnerable in the 2007 IUCN Red List. The 2009 assessment maintained their status at vulnerable. This petrel has an occurrence range of 9,670,000 km^{2} (3,730,000 sq mi) and a population estimated at between 31,000 and 45,000. Their population is trending up at between 1% and 9% over 60 years, and possibly 45% over the last five years.

The spectacled petrel is threatened by interactions with longline fisheries which kills hundreds of birds every year as they become entangled in the fishing lines and drown.

The spectacled petrel is listed on CMS Appendix II and ACAP Annex 1. A census was conducted in 2004, and Inaccessible Island is a World Heritage Site, with restricted access. To help the species, other conservation measures have been proposed. Conducting surveys of the breeding population as an ongoing process. Pushing for adoption of the best-practice mitigation measures in fisheries within this bird's range, utilizing organizations such as the Food and Agriculture Organization, Agreement on the Conservation of Albatrosses and Petrels, and International Commission for the Conservation of Atlantic Tunas. Restricting access to prevent colonization of introduced species. Finally, looking for other breeding locations.

== Sources ==
- BirdLife International. "Spectacled Petrel - BirdLife Species Factsheet". Data Zone.
- Double, M. C. (2003). "Procellariiformes (Tubenosed Seabirds)". In Hutchins, Michael; Jackson, Jerome A.; Bock, Walter J.; Olendorf, Donna (eds.). Grzimek's Animal Life Encyclopedia. Vol. 8 Birds I Tinamous and Ratites to Hoatzins. Joseph E. Trumpey, Chief Scientific Illustrator (2nd ed.). Farmington Hills, MI: Gale Group. pp. 107–111. ISBN 0-7876-5784-0.
- Ehrlich, Paul R.; Dobkin, David, S.; Wheye, Darryl (1988). The Birders Handbook (First ed.). New York, NY: Simon & Schuster. pp. 29–31. ISBN 0-671-65989-8.
- Gotch, A. F. (1995) [1979]. "Albatrosses, Fulmars, Shearwaters, and Petrels". Latin Names Explained A Guide to the Scientific Classifications of Reptiles, Birds & Mammals. New York, NY: Facts on File. p. 192. ISBN 0-8160-3377-3.
