= Pio Point =

Coordinates: 54°1′S 38°5′W

Pio Point is a point forming the north side of the entrance to Johnson Cove at the west end of Bird Island, South Georgia. Roughly charted by DI personnel on the Discovery in the period 1926-30 and surveyed by HMS Owen in 1960–61. Named by the United Kingdom Antarctic Place-Names Committee (UK-APC) in 1963. "Pio" is an old sailors' name for the light-mantled sooty albatross (Phoebetria palpebrata), a bird which breeds on Bird Island.

== Prince Creek ==
Prince Creek is a cove north of Pio Point along the west side of Bird Island, South Georgia. The cove was named by United Kingdom Antarctic Place-Names Committee (UK-APC) for Peter A. Prince, assistant in fur seal investigations, Bird Island, 1971–74, and principal investigator on fur seals and birds, 1975–76.
