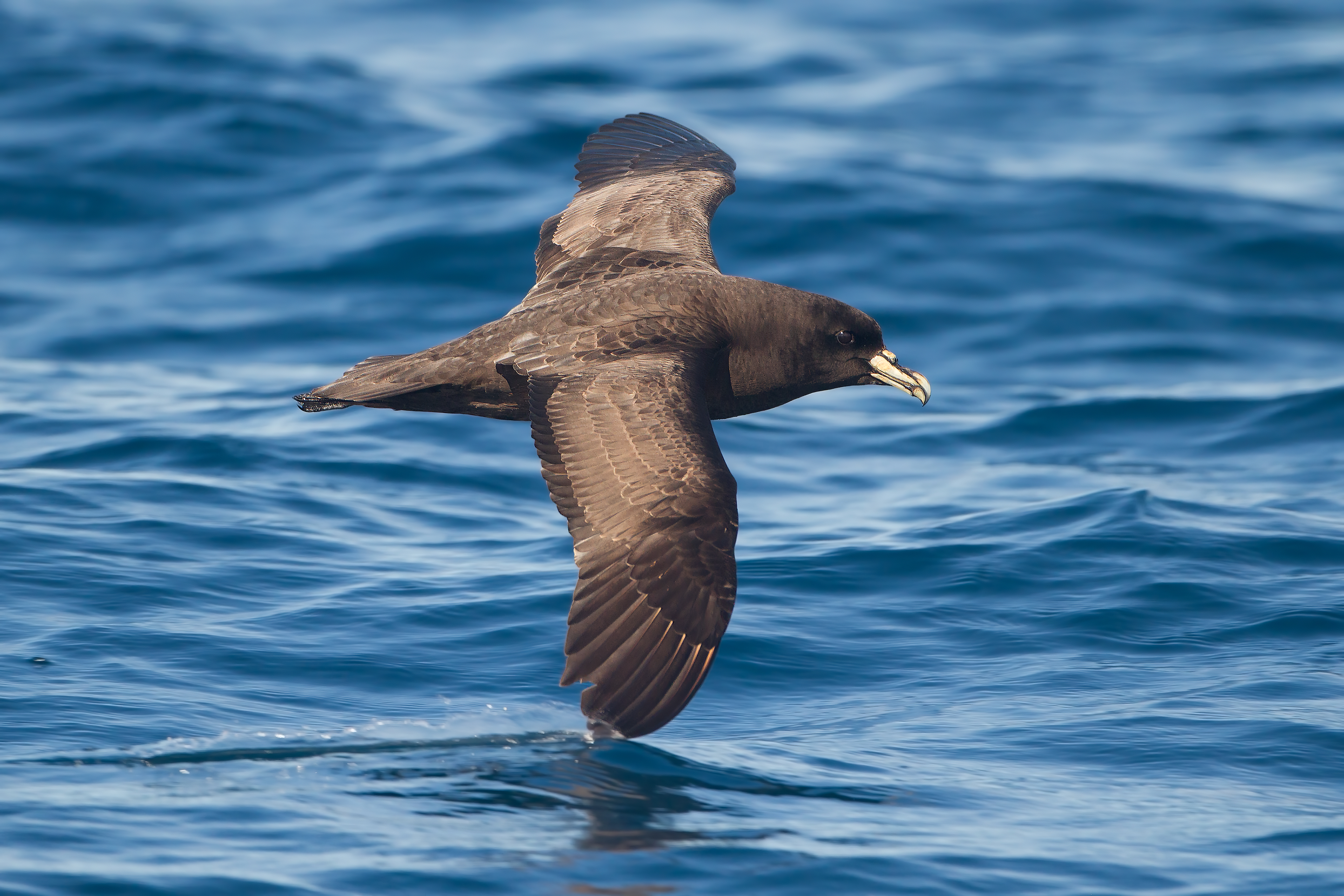

Conservation status
- Vulnerable (IUCN 3.1)

Scientific classification
- Kingdom: Animalia
- Phylum: Chordata
- Class: Aves
- Order: Procellariiformes
- Family: Procellariidae
- Genus: Procellaria
- Species: P. aequinoctialis

Binomial name
- Procellaria aequinoctialis Linnaeus, 1758

Subspecies
- P. a. aequinoctialis Linnaeus, 1758; P. a. steadi Mathews, 1912

= White-chinned petrel =

Species of bird

The white-chinned petrel (Procellaria aequinoctialis) also known as the Cape hen and shoemaker, is a large petrel in the family Procellariidae. It ranges around the Southern Ocean as far north as southern Australia, Peru and Namibia, and breeds colonially on scattered islands. The white-chinned petrel was formerly considered to be conspecific with the spectacled petrel (Procellaria conspicillata).

== Taxonomy ==
In 1747 the English naturalist George Edwards included an illustration and a description of the white-chinned petrel in the second volume of his A Natural History of Uncommon Birds. He used the English name "The great Black Peteril" and based his hand-coloured etching on a preserved specimen that had been brought to London. He believed that it had been collected near the Cape of Good Hope. When in 1758 the Swedish naturalist Carl Linnaeus updated his Systema Naturae for the tenth edition, he placed the white-chinned petrel with the other petrels in the genus Procellaria. Linnaeus included a brief description, coined the binomial name Procellaria aequinoctialis and cited Edwards' work.

There are two subspecies:

- P. a. aequinoctialis - breeds on islets of the temperate and subantarctic South Atlantic and South Indian Oceans, winters throughout them
- P. a. steadi - breeds on the subantarctic islands of New Zealand, winters throughout the South Pacific Ocean

Both subspecies were formerly considered synonymous with each other, but were recognized as distinct by the International Ornithological Congress in 2022 based on strong genetic distinctiveness.

The genus name Procellaria is from the Latin procella meaning "storm" or "gale. The specific epithet aequinoctialis is Latin meaning equinoctial (aequinoctium is the Latin word for "equinox"). The word petrel is derived from Saint Peter and the story of his walking on water, referring to their appearing to run on the water's surface when taking to the air. Other English names for this species are Cape hen and shoemaker.

The white-chinned petrel is a member of the family Procellariidae, and the order Procellariiformes. As a member of the Procellariiformes, they share certain identifying features. First, they have nasal passages that attach to the upper bill called naricorns. Although the nostrils on the petrel are on top of the upper bill. The bills of Procellariiformes are also unique in that they are split into between seven and nine horny plates. They produce a stomach oil made up of wax esters and triglycerides that is stored in the proventriculus. This can be sprayed out of their mouths as a defence against predators and as an energy rich food source for chicks and for the adults during their long flights. Finally, they also have a salt gland that is situated above the nasal passage and helps desalinate their bodies, due to the high amount of ocean water that they imbibe. It excretes a high saline solution from the nose.

== Description ==
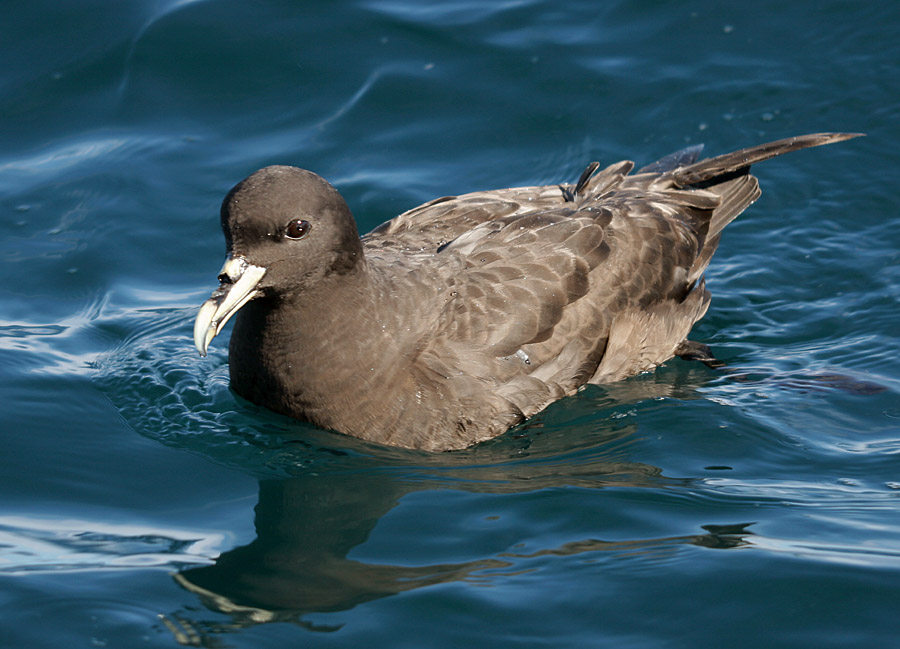
A white-chinned petrel off the coast of Kaikōura

The white-chinned petrel measures 51–58 cm (20–23 in) in length and has a wingspan of 134–147 cm (53–58 in). Males are heavier and average 1,390 g (49 oz) whereas females weigh around 1,280 g (45 oz). Not only is it the largest Procellaria petrel but is also the largest species in its family outside of the giant petrels. This large petrel is sooty-black and has some white on its throat and chin, more so in the Indian Ocean sector than the Atlantic. Its primaries can have a silvery appearance underneath. Its bill may be horn or yellow with some black between the nostrils. It has black legs and feet. When it flies, it mixes slow wing beats with glides. Although normally quiet, it will rattle or groan while at its colony.

== Distribution and habitat ==
The white-chinned petrel utilises many islands during the breeding season. 2,000,000 pairs breed on South Georgia, Between 175,000 and 226,000 pairs are on the Kerguelen Islands, and 100,000 pairs on Disappointment Island. Some also breed on the Crozet Islands, Prince Edward Islands, Campbell Islands, Auckland Islands, Antipodes Islands, and the Falkland Islands. During the non-breeding season, the petrels fly from the Antarctic pack ice to the subtropics.

=== Vagrancy ===
The white-chinned petrel was recorded as a vagrant in Great Britain in May 2020, which was the second record of this species in the North Atlantic.

== Behaviour ==
=== Breeding ===
Both sexes help to build a nest, and will help incubate the egg. Upon hatching, both sexes again will assist in feeding and protecting the young.

=== Feeding ===
Their diet is composed mainly of krill followed by fish. White-chinned petrels feed by surface seizing and by undertaking shallow dives, and they will readily follow ships to collect fisheries discards, making them vulnerable to longline fisheries.

== Conservation ==
A 2004 estimate placed the adult population at 7,000,000 with an occurrence range of 44,800,000 km^{2} (17,300,000 sq mi). Mortality of both adults and chicks due to longline fisheries has caused the IUCN to classify it as vulnerable. An overall decline in population is inferred by a drop in burrow occupancy rates of 28% at Bird Island, and an 86% reduction in population at Prydz Bay. Also, monitoring on Marion Island has shown of 14.5% reduction, and a 37% reduction on the Crozet Islands. Unintentional death at the hands of longline fisheries has proven to be a major contributor to the overall population decline. Nearly all of the bycatch from the Namibian hake are white-chinned petrels. 10% of the South African pelagic longline bycatch and 55% of the demersal. Also, the white-chinned petrel has suffered at the hands of invasive species such as the brown rat, Rattus novegicus, and the black rat, Rattus rattus.

Several of the breeding islands are protected areas. Ongoing studies and population monitoring are occurring at South Georgia, the Prince Edward Islands, Kerguelen Islands, and Crozet Islands. Finally, they are a part of ACAP Annex I, and CMS Appendix II.

To assist in reversing the decline in population it has been proposed to continue and extend monitoring studies, trying to eliminate most invasive species, promote adoption of best practice mitigation measures at all fisheries within the range via ACAP, FAO, CCAMLR.

Breeding population and trends
Location	Population	Date	Trend
South Georgia	< 2,000,000 pairs	2004	Decreasing 28% per 20 years
Antipodes Island	100,000+ pairs	2000	
Disappointment Island	100,000+ pairs	2000	
Kerguelen Islands	175,000-226,000 pairs	1989	
Crozet Islands	23,600 pairs	1989	Decreasing 37% per 21 years
Campbell Islands exc. Campbell Island	10,000+ pairs		
Falkland Islands	55 pairs		
Prince Edward Island			Decreasing 14.5% per year
Auckland Islands			
Total	7,000,000	2004	Decreasing 30% to 49% per 60 yr

== Sources ==
- Berrow, S.; Croxall, J. (1999). "The Diet of white-chinned petrels Procellaria aequinoctialis, Linnaeus 1758, in years of contrasting prey availability at South Georgia" (PDF). Antarctic Science. 11 (3): 283–292. Bibcode:1999AntSc..11..283B. doi:10.1017/s0954102099000371. S2CID 85912122.
- BirdLife International (2009). "White-chinned Petrel - BirdLife Species Factsheet". Data Zone.
- Cherel, Y.; Weimerskirch, H.; Duhamel, G. (1996). "Interactions between longline vessels and seabirds in Kerguelen waters and a method to reduce seabird mortality". Biological Conservation. 75 (1): 63–70. Bibcode:1996BCons..75...63C. doi:10.1016/0006-3207(95)00037-2.
- Double, M. C. (2003). "Procellariiformes (Tubenosed Seabirds)". In Hutchins, Michael; Jackson, Jerome A.; Bock, Walter J.; Olendorf, Donna (eds.). Grzimek's Animal Life Encyclopedia. Vol. 8 Birds I Tinamous and Ratites to Hoatzins. Joseph E. Trumpey, Chief Scientific Illustrator (2nd ed.). Farmington Hills, MI: Gale Group. pp. 107–111. ISBN 0-7876-5784-0.
- Ehrlich, Paul R.; Dobkin, David, S.; Wheye, Darryl (1988). The Birders Handbook (First ed.). New York, NY: Simon & Schuster. pp. 29–31. ISBN 0-671-65989-8.
- Gotch, A. F. (1995) [1979]. "Albatrosses, Fulmars, Shearwaters, and Petrels". Latin Names Explained A Guide to the Scientific Classifications of Reptiles, Birds & Mammals. New York, NY: Facts on File. p. 192. ISBN 0-8160-3377-3.
- Huin, N. (1994). "Diving Depths of White-Chinned Petrels". Condor. 96 (4): 1111–1113. doi:10.2307/1369125. JSTOR 1369125.
- Maynard, B. J. (2003). "Shearwaters, petrels, and fulmars (Procellariidae)". In Hutchins, Michael; Jackson, Jerome A.; Bock, Walter J.; Olendorf, Donna (eds.). Grzimek's Animal Life Encyclopedia. Vol. 8 Birds I Tinamous and Ratites to Hoatzins. Joseph E. Trumpey, Chief Scientific Illustrator (2nd ed.). Farmington Hills, MI: Gale Group. pp. 123–133. ISBN 0-7876-5784-0.
