= Payne Creek (Antarctica) =

Body of water in Antarctica

Payne Creek (54°0′S 38°4′W) is a narrow cove just south of Goldcrest Point along the west side of Bird Island, South Georgia. Named by United Kingdom Antarctic Place-Names Committee (UK-APC) for Michael R. Payne, British Antarctic Survey (BAS) principal investigator on fur seals, Bird Island, 1971–74.
