= The Pyramid (Chatham Islands) =

Island in the Chatham Islands, New Zealand

Coordinates: 44°25′56″S 176°14′27″W

The Pyramid (Tarakoikoia)
Tcharako (Moriori)
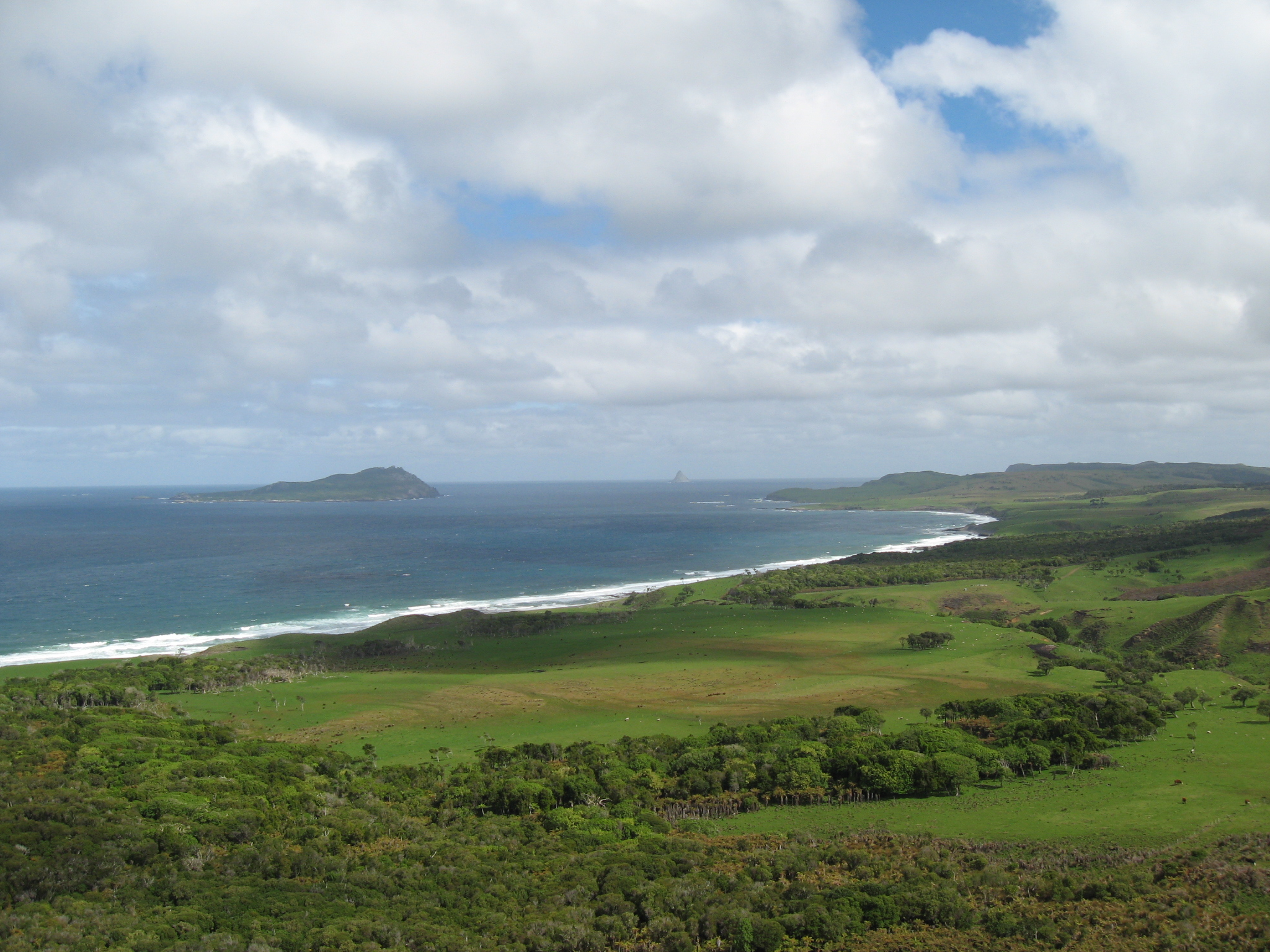
- On the LHS South East Island (Rangatira) and in the distance in the middle of photograph "The Pyramid"(Tarakoikoia)

- Map showing location of The Pyramid

Geography
- Archipelago: Chatham Islands

Administration
- New Zealand

Demographics
- Population: 0

The Pyramid (Moriori: Tcharako; Māori: Te Tara Koi Koia; officially The Pyramid (Tarakoikoia)) is a small island south of Pitt Island in the Chatham Islands group of New Zealand. The site has been identified as an Important Bird Area by BirdLife International because it supports the only known breeding colony of Chatham albatrosses, with 4575 pairs recorded in 2001.

Based on the 180th meridian, it is the southwesternmost point of land in the world outside of Antarctica; if the International Date Line is used instead, however, Niue has that honour.

== See also ==
- List of islands of New Zealand
- List of islands
- Desert island
