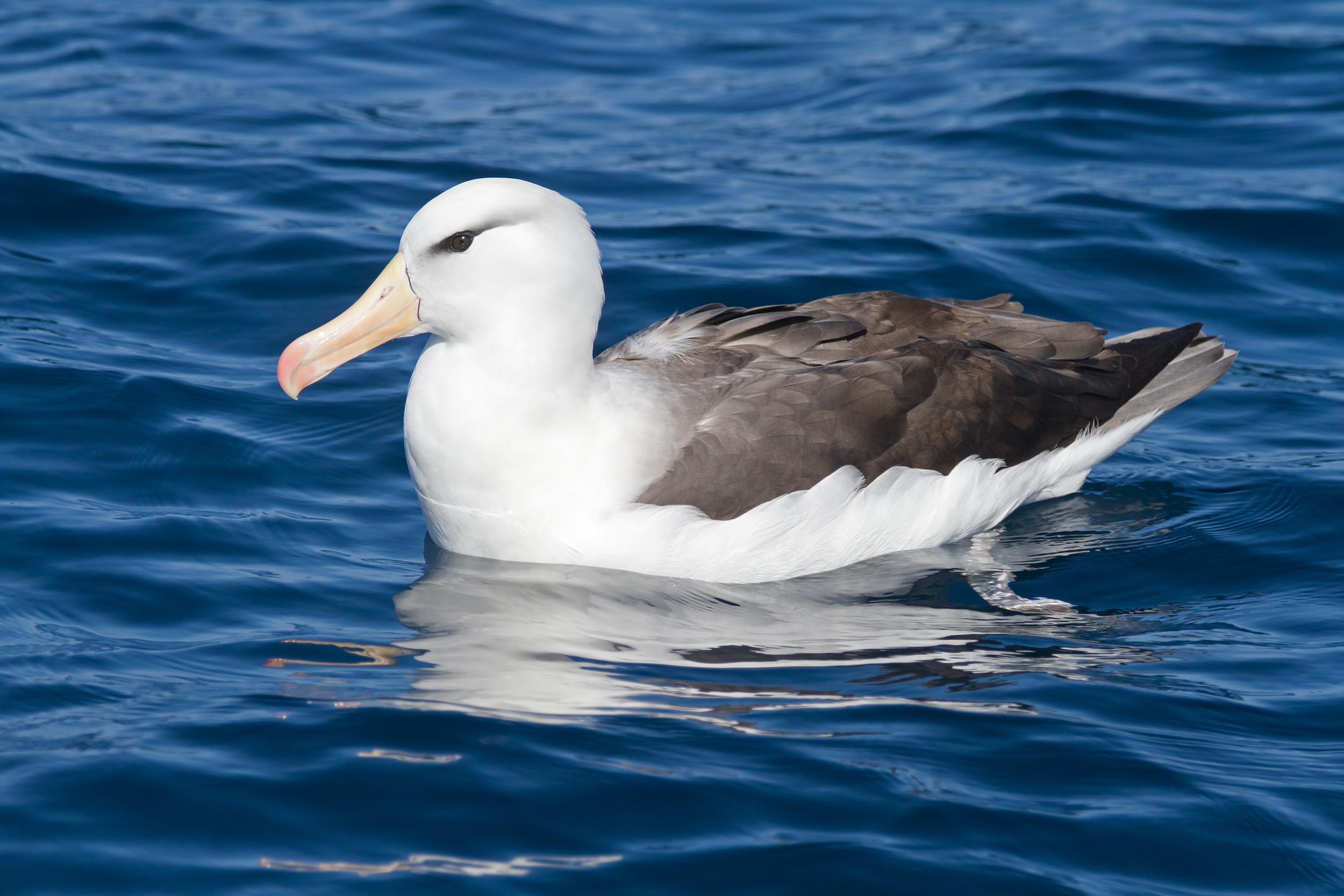

Conservation status
- Least Concern (IUCN 3.1)

Scientific classification
- Kingdom: Animalia
- Phylum: Chordata
- Class: Aves
- Order: Procellariiformes
- Family: Diomedeidae
- Genus: Thalassarche
- Species: T. melanophris

Binomial name
- Thalassarche melanophris (Temminck, 1828)
- Black-browed albatross range

Synonyms
- Diomedea melanophris

= Black-browed albatross =

Species of bird in the albatross family

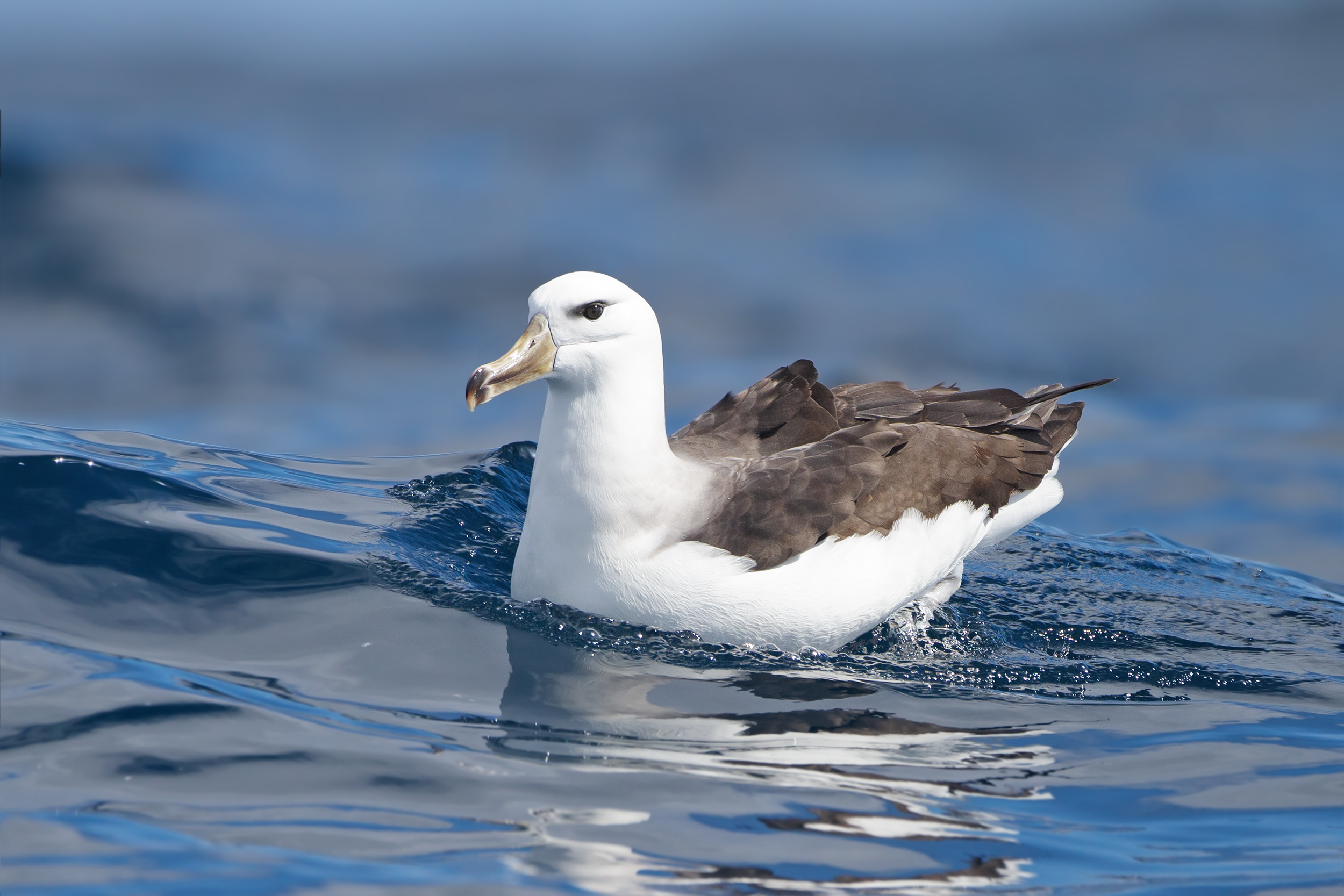
Sub-adult plumage

The black-browed albatross (Thalassarche melanophris), also known as the black-browed mollymawk, is a large seabird of the albatross family Diomedeidae; it is the most widespread and common member of its family.

== Taxonomy ==
Mollymawks are albatrosses in the family Diomedeidae and order Procellariiformes, which also includes shearwaters, fulmars, storm petrels, and diving petrels. These birds share certain identifying features. They have nasal passages that attach to the upper bill called naricorns, although the nostrils on the albatross are on the sides of the bill. The bills of Procellariiformes are also unique in that they are split into between seven and nine horny plates. They produce a stomach oil made up of wax esters and triglycerides that is stored in the proventriculus. This is used against predators as well as being an energy-rich food source for chicks and also for the adults during their long flights. The albatross also has a salt gland above the nasal passage which helps to remove salt from the ocean water that they imbibe. The gland excretes a high saline solution through the bird's nose.

In 1998, Robertson and Nunn published their view that the Campbell albatross (Thalassarche impavida), should be split from this species (T. melanophris). Over the course of the next few years, others agreed, including BirdLife International in 2000, and Brooke in 2004. James Clements did not adopt the split, the ACAP has not yet adopted the split, and the SACC recognizes the need for a proposal.

The black-browed albatross was first described as Diomedea melanophris by Coenraad Jacob Temminck, in 1828, based on a specimen from the Cape of Good Hope.

== Etymology ==
The origin of the name melanophris comes from two Greek words melas or melanos, meaning "black", and ophris, meaning "eyebrow", referring to dark feathering around the eyes.

== Description ==
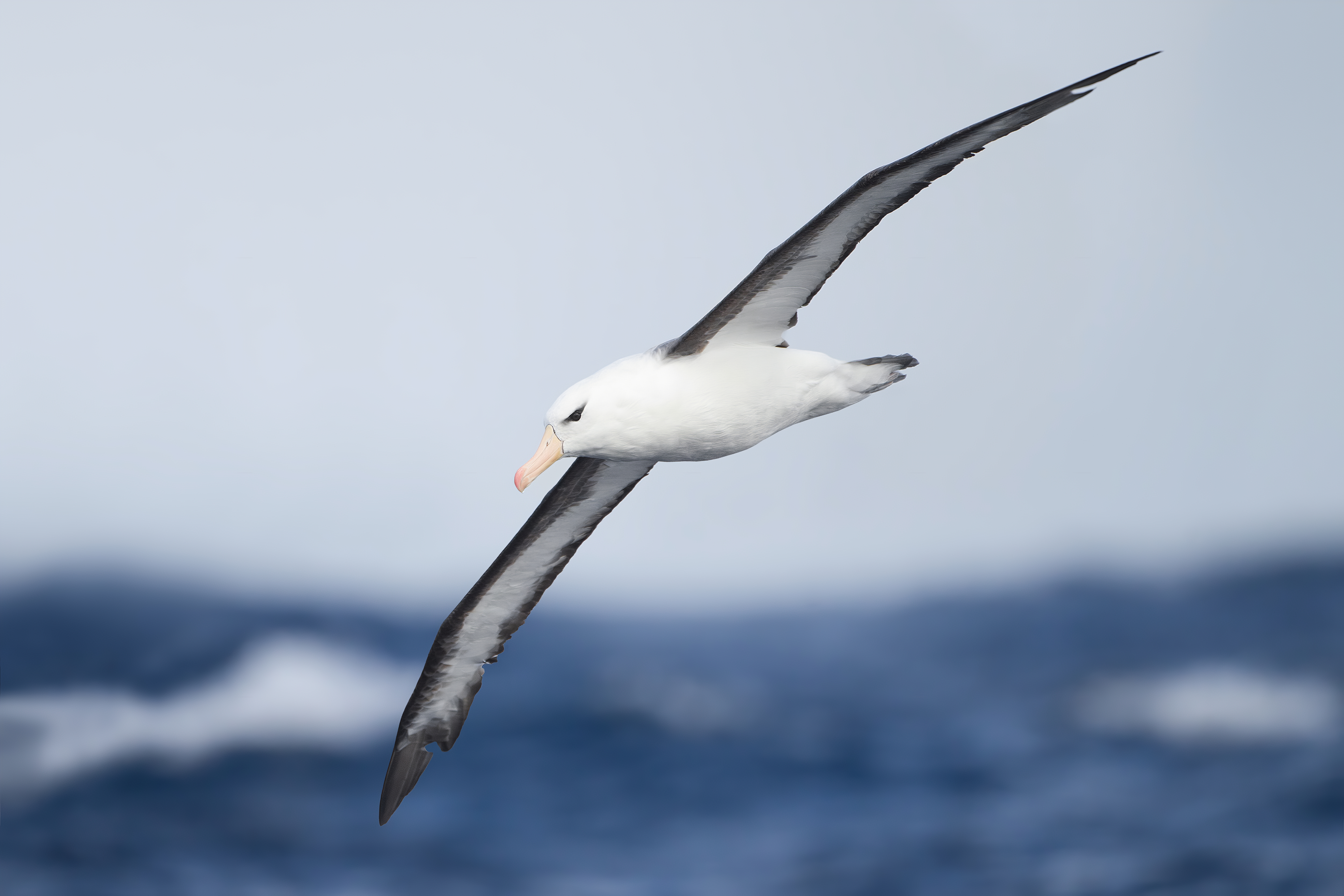
East of Tasmania, Southern Ocean

The black-browed albatross is a medium-sized albatross, at 80 to 95 cm (31–37 in) long with a 200 to 240 cm (79–94 in) wingspan and an average weight of 2.9 to 4.7 kg (6.4–10.4 lb). It can have a natural lifespan of over 70 years. It has a dark grey saddle and upperwings that contrast with the white rump, and underparts. The underwing is predominantly white with broad, irregular, black margins. It has a dark eyebrow and a yellow-orange bill with a darker reddish-orange tip. Juveniles have dark horn-colored bills with dark tips, and a grey head and collar. They also have dark underwings. The features that distinguish it from other mollymawks (except the closely related Campbell albatross) are the dark eyestripe which gives it its name, a broad black edging to the white underside of its wings, white head and orange bill, tipped darker orange. The Campbell albatross is very similar but with a pale eye. Immature birds are similar to grey-headed albatrosses but the latter have wholly dark bills and more complete dark head markings.

== Range and habitat ==
Breeding population and trends
Location	Population	Date	Trend
Falkland Islands	399,416 pairs	2007	Decreasing 0.7% yr
South Georgia Island	74,296 pairs	2006	Decreasing
Chile	122,000 pairs	2007	
Antipodes Island	?	1998	
Campbell Island	?	1998	
Heard Island	600 pairs	1998	Increasing
McDonald Island	?	1998	
Crozet Islands	?	1998	
Kerguelen Islands	?	1998	Decreasing
Macquarie Island	?	1998	
Snares Islands	?	1998	
Total	600,000 pairs	2005	Decreasing

The black-browed albatross is circumpolar in the southern oceans, and it breeds on 12 islands throughout that range. In the Atlantic Ocean, it breeds on the Falkland Islands, South Georgia and the South Sandwich Islands, and the Cape Horn Islands. In the Pacific Ocean it breeds on Islas Ildefonso, Diego de Almagro, Islas Evangelistas, Campbell Island, Antipodes Islands, Snares Islands, and Macquarie Island. In the Indian Ocean it breeds on the Crozet Islands, Kerguelen Islands, Heard Island, and McDonald Island.

There are an estimated 1,220,000 birds alive with 600,853 breeding pairs, as estimated by a 2005 count. Of these birds, 402,571 breed in the Falklands, 72,102 breed on South Georgia Island, 120,171 breed on the Chilean islands of Islas Ildefonso, Diego de Almagro, Islas Evangelistas, and Islas Diego Ramírez. 600 pairs breed on Heard Island, Finally, the remaining 5,409 pairs breed on the remaining islands. This particular species of albatross prefers to forage over shelf and shelf-break areas. Falkland Island birds winter near the Patagonian Shelf, and birds from South Georgia forage in South African waters, using the Benguela Current, and the Chilean birds forage over the Patagonian Shelf, the Chilean Shelf, and even make it as far as New Zealand. It is the most likely albatross to be found in the North Atlantic due to a northerly migratory tendency. There have been 20 possible sightings in the Continental United States.

== Behaviour ==
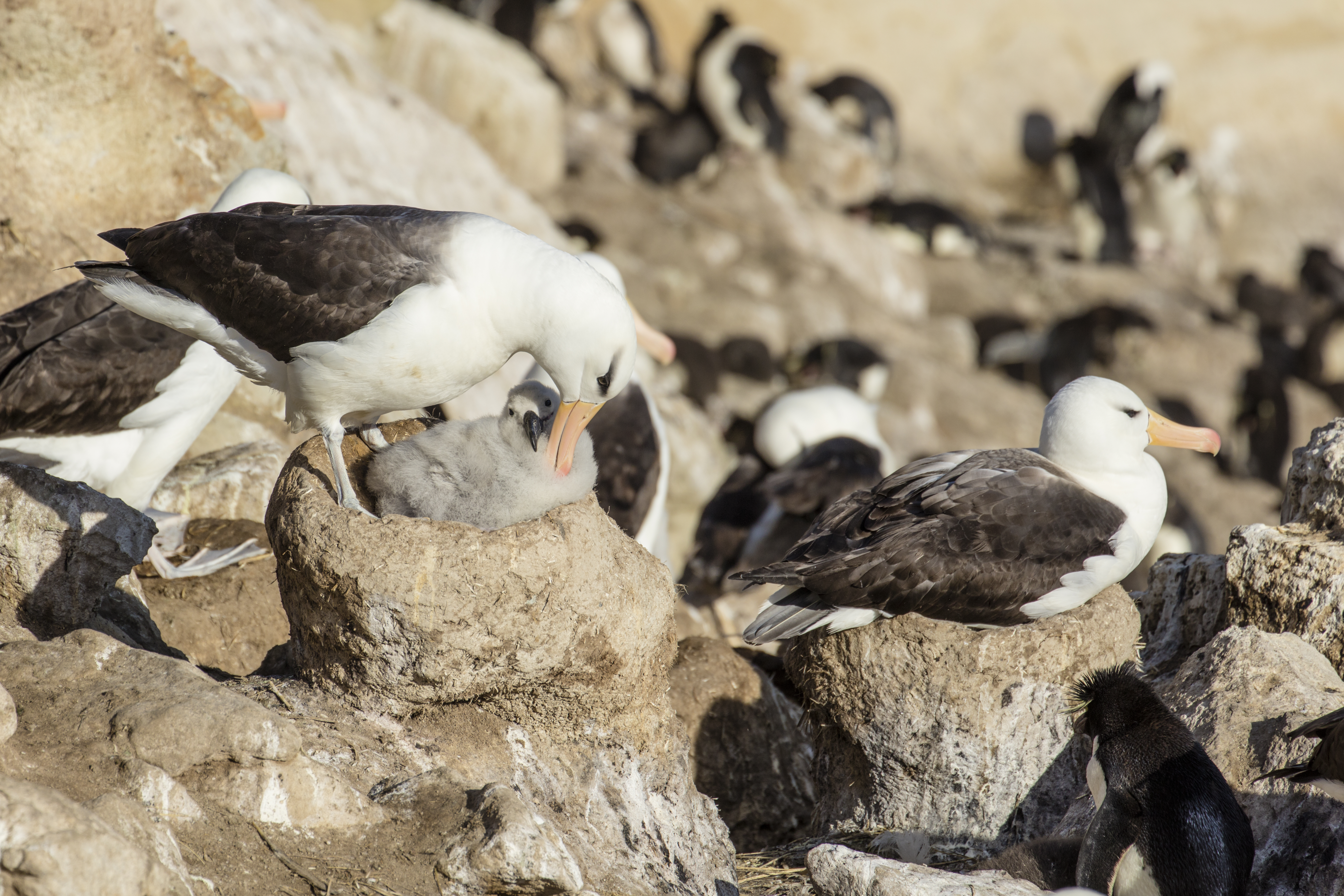
Black-browed albatross preening its newborn (New Island, Falkland Islands)

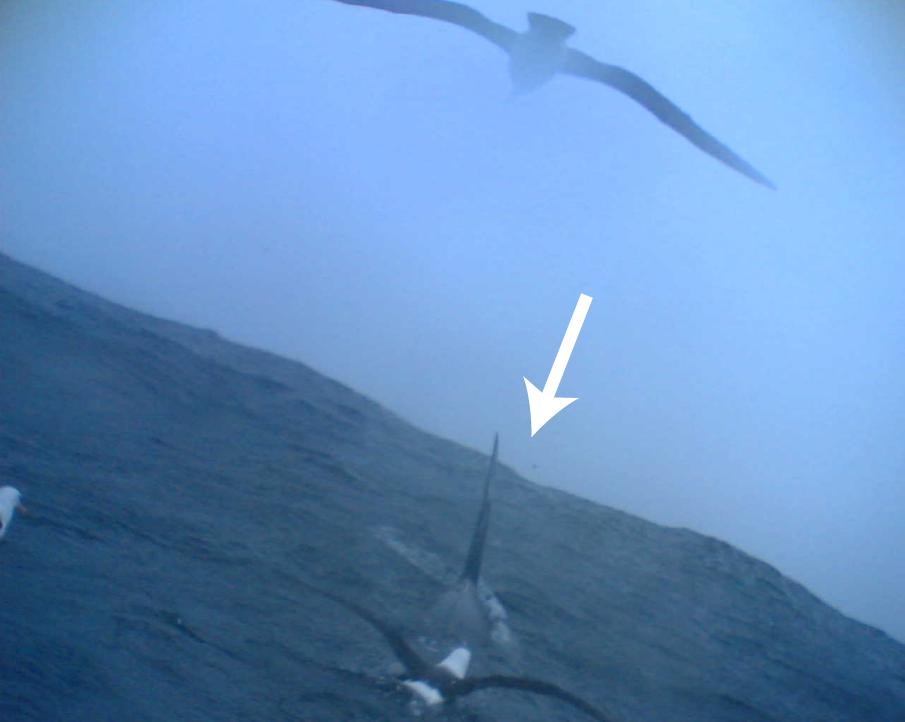
Associating with a killer whale. Picture taken by an albatross-borne camera.

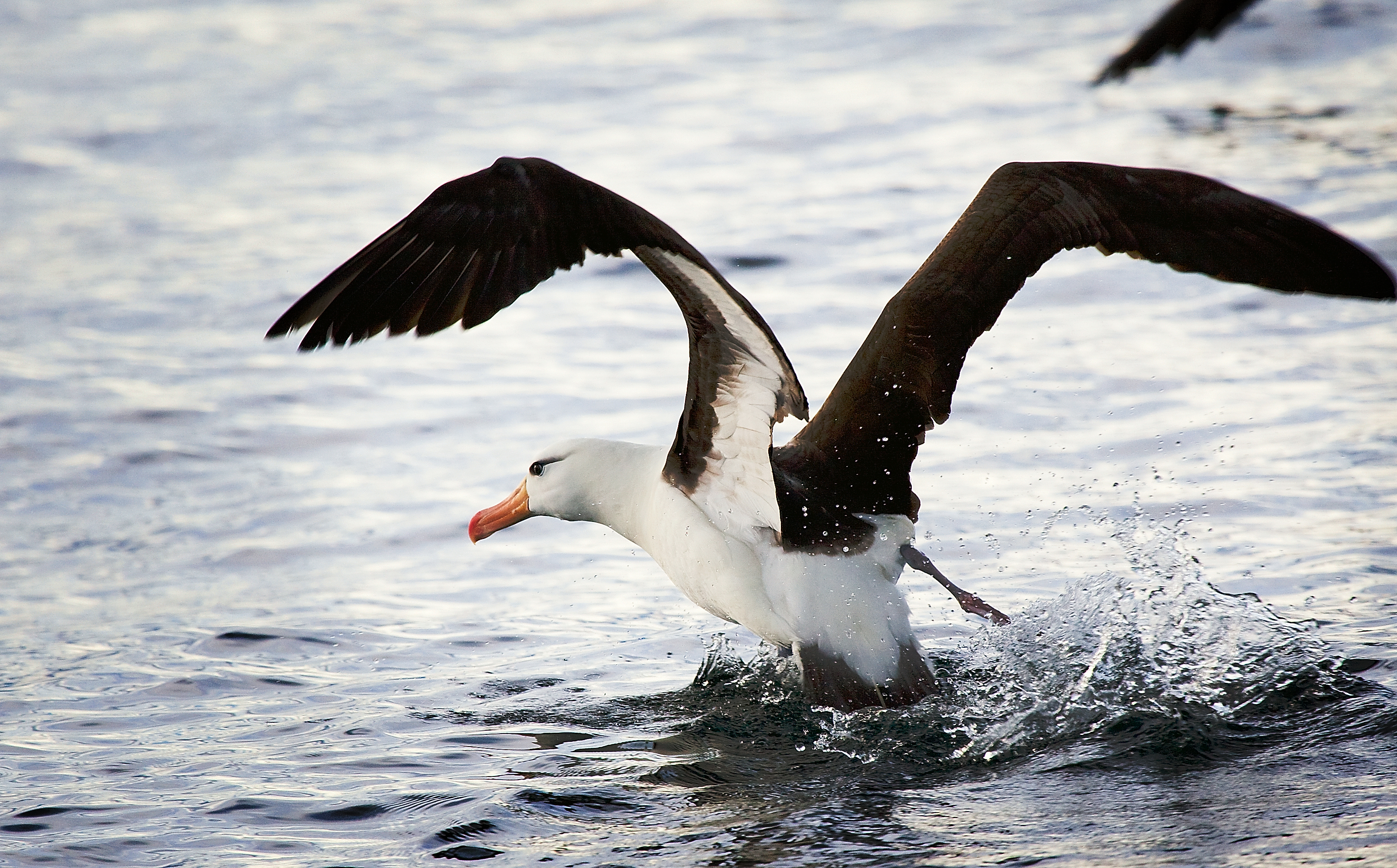
Taking off

Colonies are very noisy as they bray to mark their territory, and also cackle harshly. They use their fanned tail in courting displays.

=== Feeding ===
The black-browed albatross feeds on fish, squid, crustaceans, carrion, and fishery discards. This species has been observed stealing food from other species.

=== Reproduction ===
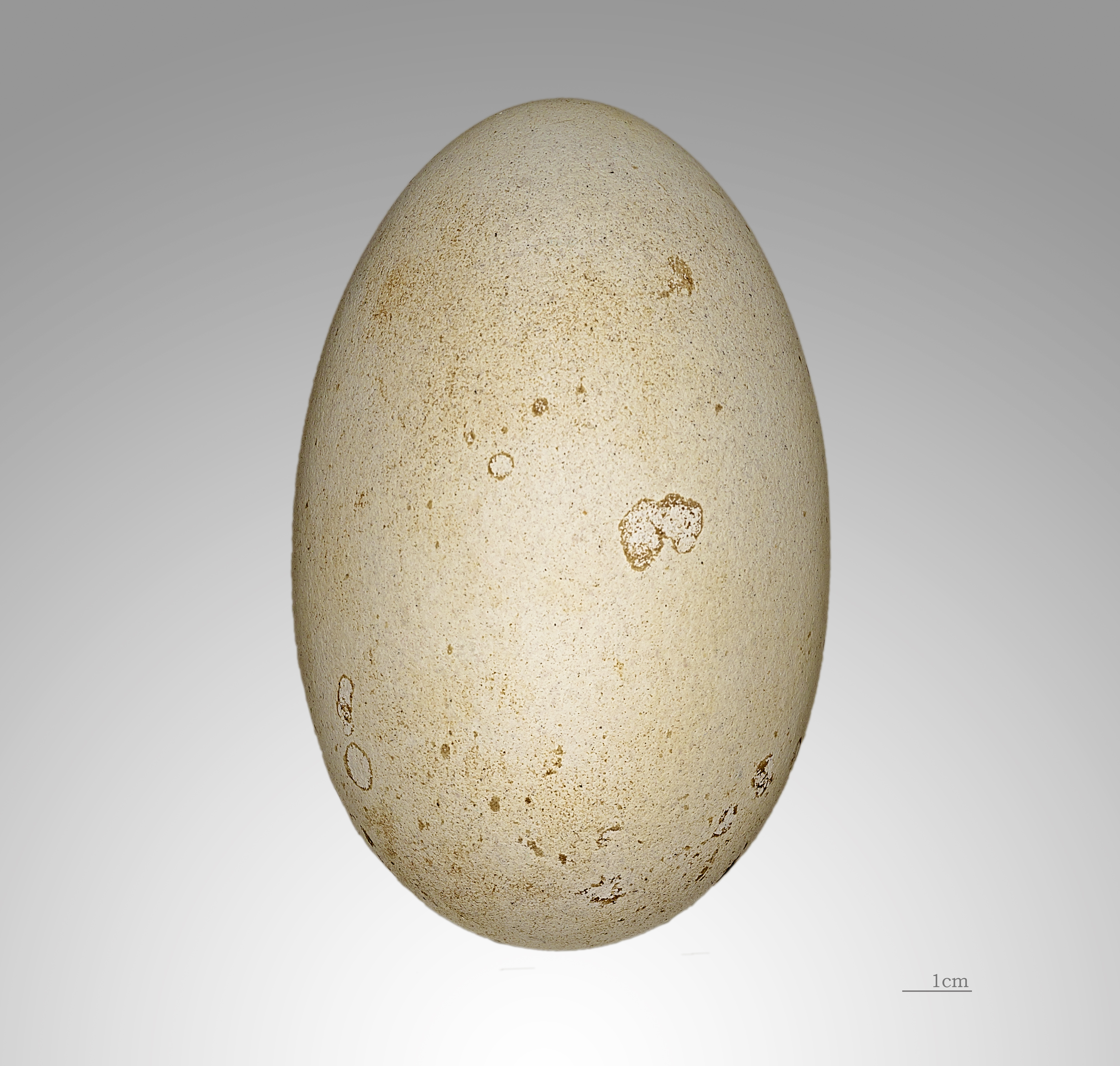
Egg - MHNT

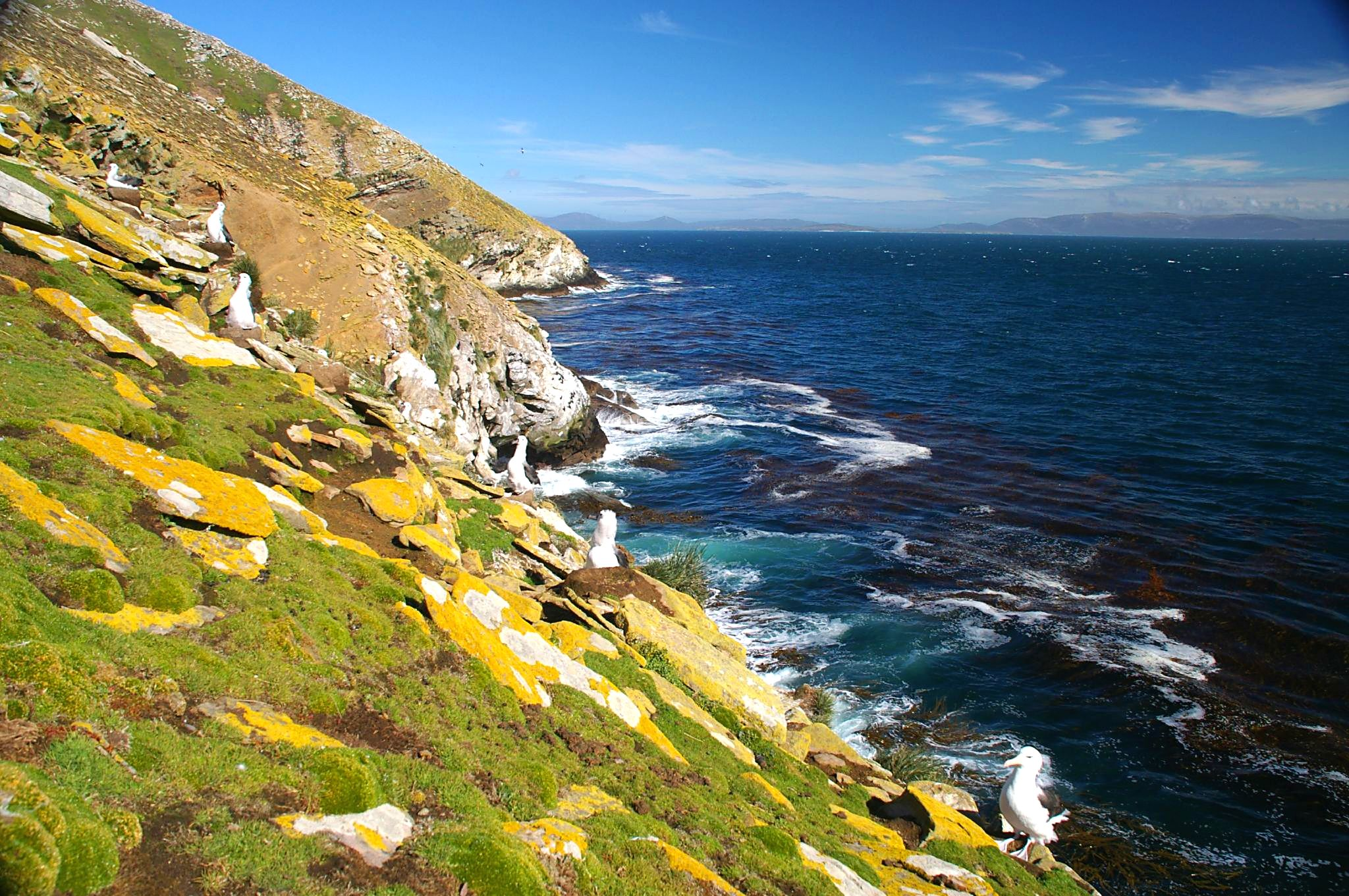
Colony on Saunders Island, Falkland Islands

This species normally nests on steep slopes covered with tussock grass and sometimes on cliffs; however, on the Falklands it nests on flat grassland on the coast. They are an annual breeder laying one egg from between 20 September and 1 November, although the Falklands, Crozet, and Kerguelen breeders lay about three weeks earlier. Eggs of this species measure 10.2–10.4 cm (4.0–4.1 in) in length and 6.6 cm (2.6 in) in width, weighing 257 g (9.1 oz). Incubation is done by both sexes and lasts 68 to 71 days. After hatching, the chicks take 120 to 130 days to fledge. Juveniles will return to the colony after two to three years but only to practice courtship rituals, as they start breeding around the 10th year.

== Conservation ==
Until 2013, the IUCN classified this species as endangered due to a drastic reduction in population. Bird Island near South Georgia Island had a 4% per year loss of nesting pairs, and the Kerguelen Island population had a 17% reduction from 1979 to 1995. Diego Ramírez decreased in the 1980s but has rebounded recently, and the Falklands had a surge in the 1980s probably due to abundant fish waste from trawlers; however, recent censuses have shown drastic reduction in the majority of the nesting sites there. There has been a 67% decline in the population over 64 years.

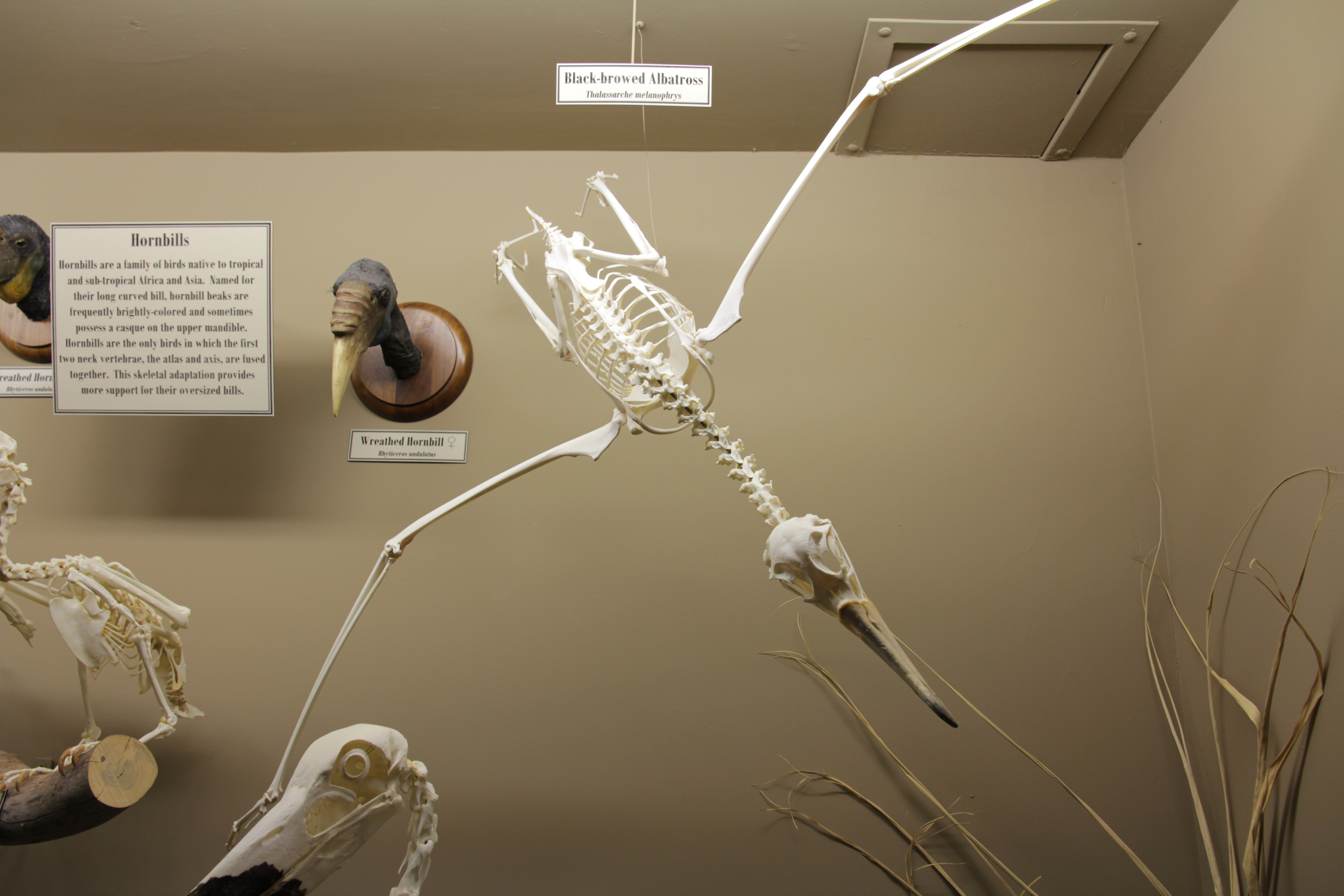
Skeleton of a black-browed albatross (Museum of Osteology)

Increased longline fishing in the southern oceans, especially around the Patagonian Shelf and around South Georgia has been attributed as a major cause of the decline of this bird, The black-browed albatross has been found to be the most common bird killed by fisheries. Trawl fishing, especially around the Patagonian Shelf and near South Africa, is also a large cause of deaths.

Conservation efforts underway start with this species being placed on Convention on Migratory Species Appendix II, and Agreement on the Conservation of Albatrosses and Petrels Annex 1. It is being monitored on half of the islands, and most of the breeding sites are reserves. Heard Island, McDonald Island, Macquarie Island, and the New Zealand islands are World Heritage Sites. An initial Chilean census has also been completed.

== Vagrancy ==
Although this is a rare occurrence, on several occasions a black-browed albatross has summered in Scottish gannet colonies (Bass Rock, Hermaness and now Sula Sgeir) for a number of years. Ornithologists believe that it was the same bird, known as Albert, who lives in north Scotland. It is believed that the bird was blown off course into the North Atlantic in 1967. A similar incident took place in the gannet colony in the Faroe Islands island of Mykines, where a black-browed albatross lived among the gannets for over 30 years. This incident is the reason why an albatross is referred to as a "gannet king" (Faroese: súlukongur). In July 2013 the first recorded sighting of a black-browed albatross in the Bahamas was made from the Bahamas Marine Mammal Research Organisation's research vessel, off Sandy Point, Abaco. For four consecutive years from 2014 on, a bird—probably the same individual named Albert—has been sighted over Heligoland, and on the east coast of England, spending much time at Bempton Cliffs. The individual spent lots of time at Bempton over the summers of 2021 and 2022, but failed to return subsequently.

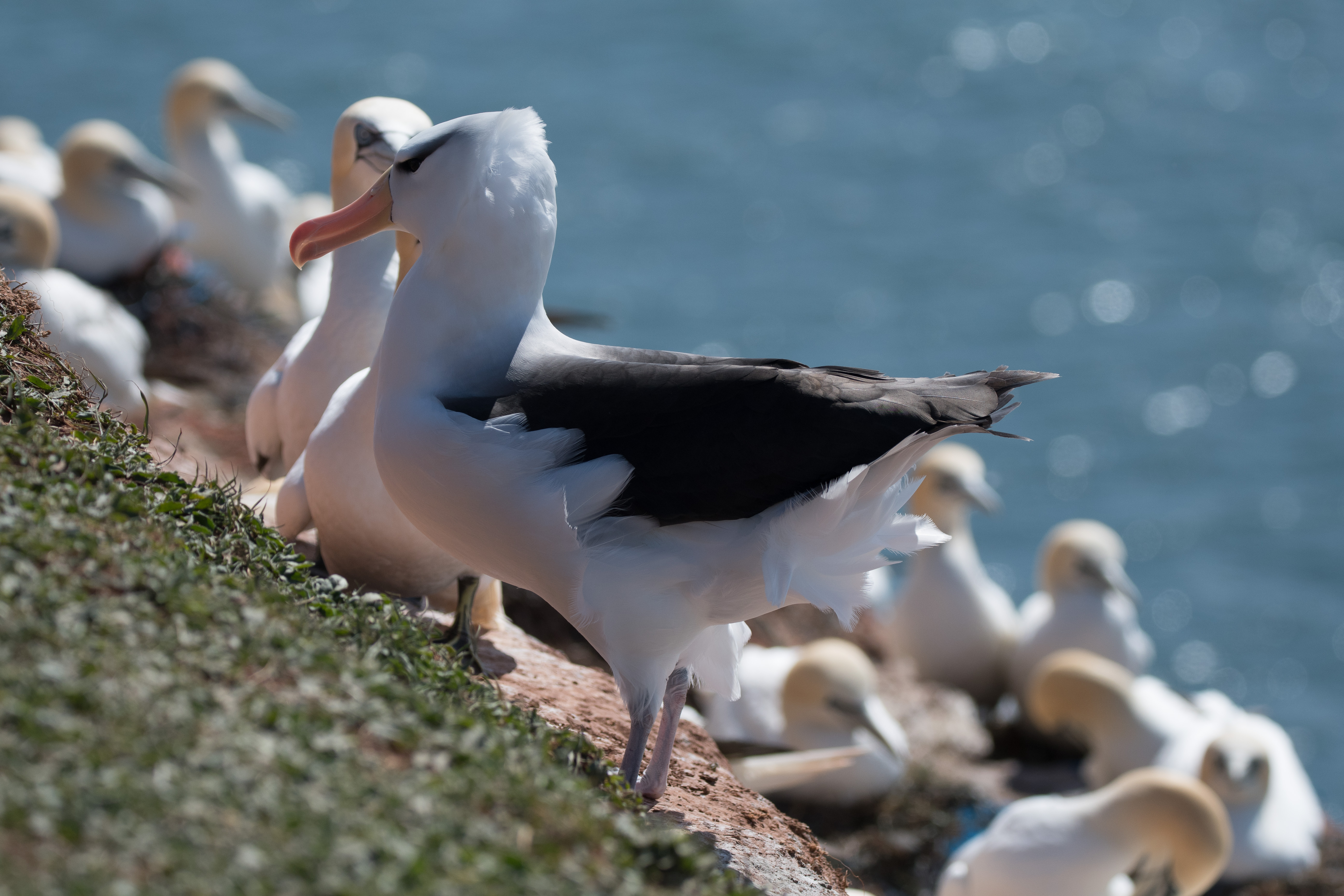
Black-browed albatross on Heligoland (April 2017)
