= Jordan Cove =

Jordan Cove (54°0′S 38°3′W) is a small cove which is the principal indentation in the south side of Bird Island, off the west end of South Georgia, near Antarctica.

It was surveyed by the South Georgia Survey in the period of 1951–57. The UK Antarctic Place-Names Committee (UKAPC) named the cove for David Starr Jordan, an American naturalist and the first president of Stanford University from 1891 to 1913. From 1896–97 Jordan was commissioner in charge of fur seal investigations in the North Pacific, and subsequently, a powerful advocate of fur seal protection by international agreement. Fur seals breed on Bird Island, particularly in the vicinity of this cove.

The western arm of Jordan Cove is called Main Bay. UKAPC has found that this descriptive name has been in local use at least since 1957.

Barracouta Rock lies submerged 0.4 nautical miles (0.7 km) south of the entrance to Jordan Cove. It was first charted by personnel on HMS Owen in 1961, and named by the UKAPC for one of Owen's survey motor boats.
