= Bird Island, South Georgia =

Bird Island
- Bird Island is to the west of South Georgia Island

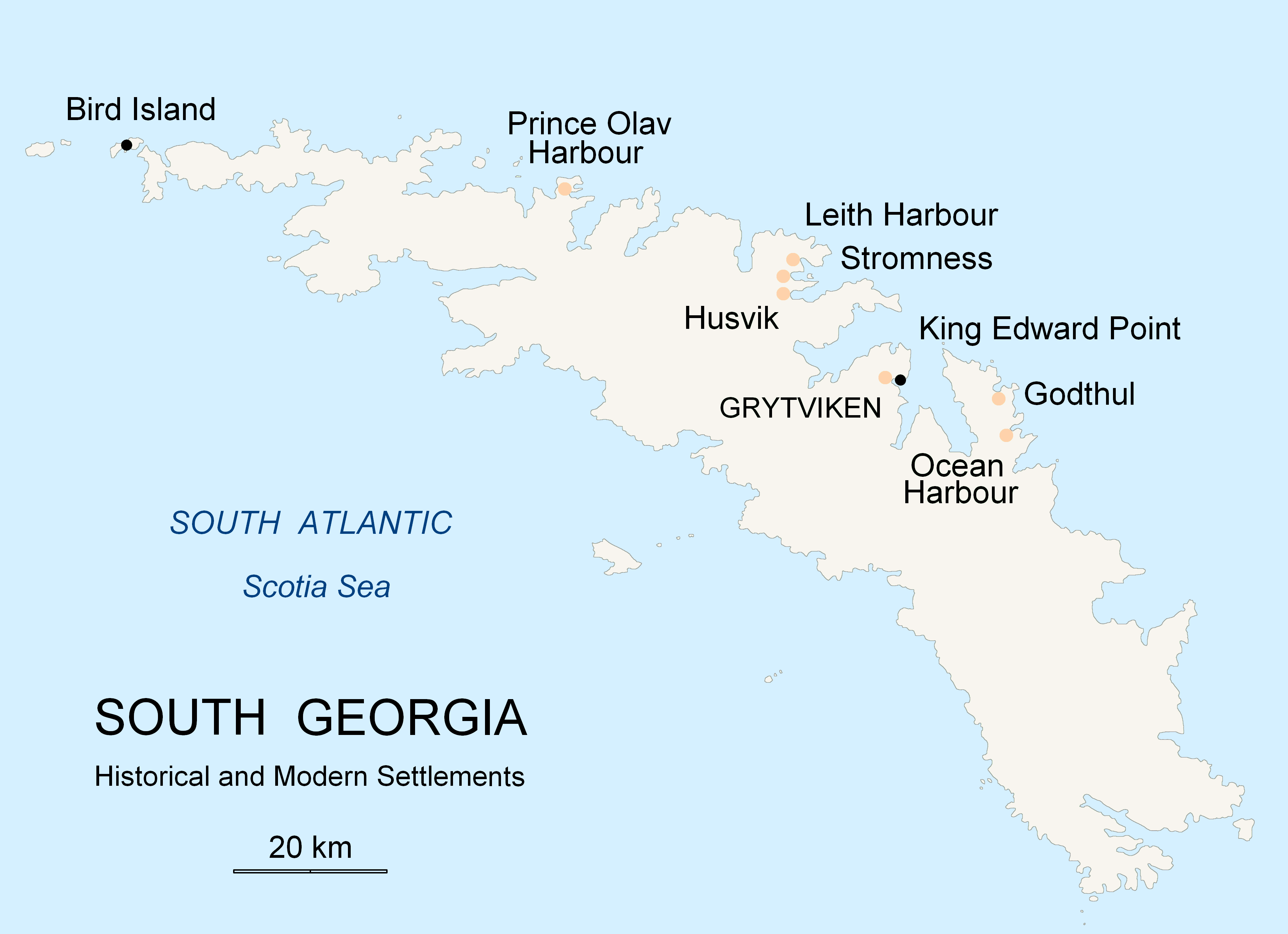
- South Georgia settlements

- Location in the Atlantic Ocean

Geography
- Location: Atlantic Ocean
- Coordinates: 54°0′20″S 38°3′0″W
- Highest elevation: 365 m (1198 ft)
- Highest point: Roché Peak

Administration
- United Kingdom
- Overseas Territory: SGSSI

Additional information
- Time zone: GST (UTC−2)

Bird Island (Spanish: Isla Pájaro) is 4.8 kilometres (3 mi) long and 800 metres (875 yd) wide, separated from the western end of South Georgia by Bird Sound. It is part of the British overseas territory of South Georgia and the South Sandwich Islands, also claimed by Argentina as part of Tierra del Fuego province.

== History ==
It was discovered in 1775 by a British expedition under James Cook, who so named it "on account of the vast numbers [of birds] that were upon it".

In the late 1950s, the island was the subject of a number of US-funded projects. Between 1959–62, a great number of the island's wandering albatross were ringed, which gave startling data about their range. One bird was found in Australia.

The island is currently a Site of Special Scientific Interest, and so there are no landings allowed without permission.

The summit of the island, Roché Peak, is named after the Englishman Anthony de la Roché who discovered South Georgia in 1675. Farewell Point forms the northeast extremity of Bird Island.

The second highest peak on the island (at 290 m) is named Tickell Peak, after the Englishman Lance Tickell. He assisted in some of the first science on Bird Island in 1958/59. He returned twice more before the mid 1960s working on seals and albatrosses, and was one of the first to overwinter there.

2008 marked the 50th anniversary of biological research on Bird Island. Among the notable events in that year was the return of the Grey-headed albatross which was ringed as a chick by Tickell in 1958.

== Research station ==
Bird Island
- Antarctic base
- Interactive map of Bird Island
- Coordinates: 54°00′31″S 38°03′06″W
- Country: United Kingdom
- Territory: SGSSI
- Operator: British Antarctic Survey
- Established: 1957

Population (2018)
  - Summer: 10
  - Winter: 4
- UN/LOCODE: GS
- Active times: All year-round
- Status: Operational
- Activities: Bird and seal research

The island has been a station for Antarctic research since 1963 and is currently a biological research station of the British Antarctic Survey (BAS) at Jordan Cove, with three resident biologists and one technician. The main focus of the research is the ecology and population of the island's seabirds and seals.

While the British Magistrate and other civilians and military present in Grytviken were removed from South Georgia during the Argentine occupation of South Georgia in 1982, another 15 Britons remained beyond Argentine reach. The losses suffered at Grytviken prevented Argentina from occupying the rest of the island, with Bird Island Station, and field camps at Schlieper Bay, Lyell Glacier and St. Andrews Bay remaining under British control.

== Wildlife ==
The island is home to:

- 65,000 Antarctic fur seals (around 1 for every 6 m^{2} (65 sq ft) of the island)
- 50,000 macaroni penguins
- 15,000 pairs of black-browed albatross
- 12,000 pairs of grey-headed albatross
- 1,700 pairs of wandering albatross
- 500 pairs of southern giant petrels (10% of South Georgia's total)

This is in addition to several hundred thousand other birds, including gentoo penguins, South Georgia pintails and South Georgia pipits. Of South Georgia's 31 breeding species, 27 are found here. Cetaceans such as southern right whales can be seen on their feeding season in Subantarctic regions.

The island has always been rat-free, unlike the main island of South Georgia where introduced rats were eradicated between 2010 and 2015.

== Climate ==
Climate data for Bird Island, South Georgia, 1961–1990
Month	Jan	Feb	Mar	Apr	May	Jun	Jul	Aug	Sep	Oct	Nov	Dec	Year
Record high °C (°F)	11.2 (52.2)	10.7 (51.3)	10.5 (50.9)	10.2 (50.4)	6.9 (44.4)	6.0 (42.8)	5.9 (42.6)	4.8 (40.6)	7.5 (45.5)	10.4 (50.7)	9.1 (48.4)	9.4 (48.9)	11.2 (52.2)
Mean daily maximum °C (°F)	5.5 (41.9)	5.6 (42.1)	4.4 (39.9)	1.9 (35.4)	−0.5 (31.1)	−1.8 (28.8)	−2.4 (27.7)	−1.9 (28.6)	−0.2 (31.6)	1.6 (34.9)	3.4 (38.1)	4.5 (40.1)	1.7 (35.0)
Daily mean °C (°F)	3.1 (37.6)	3.5 (38.3)	2.5 (36.5)	0.4 (32.7)	−2.1 (28.2)	−3.2 (26.2)	−3.9 (25.0)	−3.3 (26.1)	−1.8 (28.8)	−0.2 (31.6)	1.0 (33.8)	2.0 (35.6)	−0.2 (31.7)
Mean daily minimum °C (°F)	0.7 (33.3)	1.4 (34.5)	0.6 (33.1)	−1 (30)	−3.8 (25.2)	−4.6 (23.7)	−5.4 (22.3)	−4.8 (23.4)	−3.4 (25.9)	−1.9 (28.6)	−1.5 (29.3)	−0.6 (30.9)	−2.0 (28.4)
Record low °C (°F)	−2 (28)	−1.7 (28.9)	−3.2 (26.2)	−4.6 (23.7)	−7.3 (18.9)	−8.5 (16.7)	−11.4 (11.5)	−10.6 (12.9)	−8.5 (16.7)	−6.6 (20.1)	−4.3 (24.3)	−2.8 (27.0)	−11.4 (11.5)
Average precipitation mm (inches)	84 (3.3)	80 (3.1)	95 (3.7)	123 (4.8)	108 (4.3)	108 (4.3)	120 (4.7)	114 (4.5)	107 (4.2)	98 (3.9)	88 (3.5)	77 (3.0)	1,204 (47.4)
Source 1: Climatic Research Unit, UEA
Source 2: Météo Climat

== See also ==
- Composite Antarctic Gazetteer
- Goldcrest Point
- History of South Georgia and the South Sandwich Islands
- List of Antarctic and sub-Antarctic islands
- List of Antarctic islands north of 60° S
- Milward Patch
- Molly Hill
- Morris Point
- Owen Shoals
- Payne Creek
- Prince Creek
- SCAR
- Shoemaker Point
- Sooty Cove
