= Amsterdam and Saint-Paul Islands temperate grasslands =

Ecological region in the southern Indian Ocean

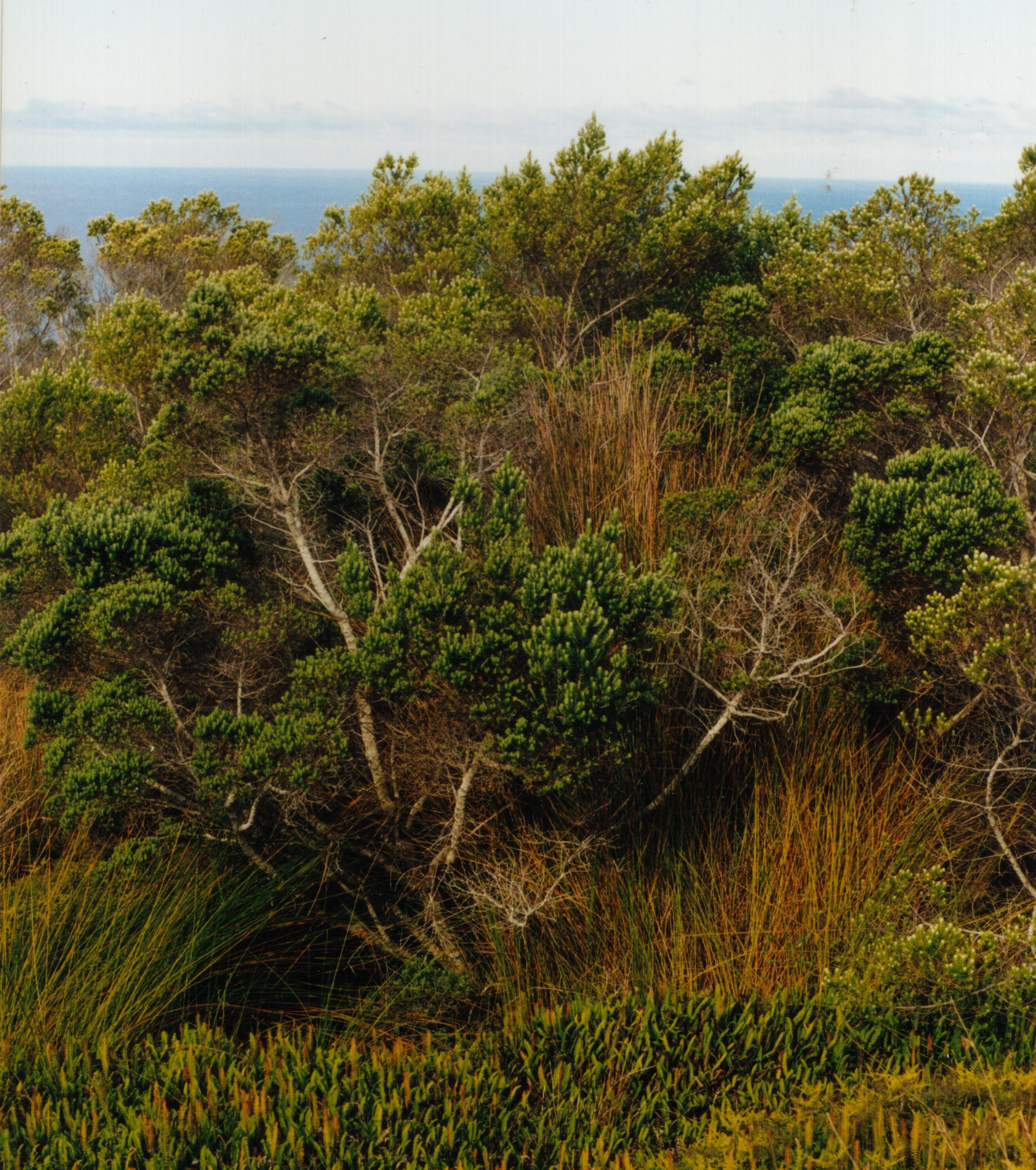
- Phylica arborea tree

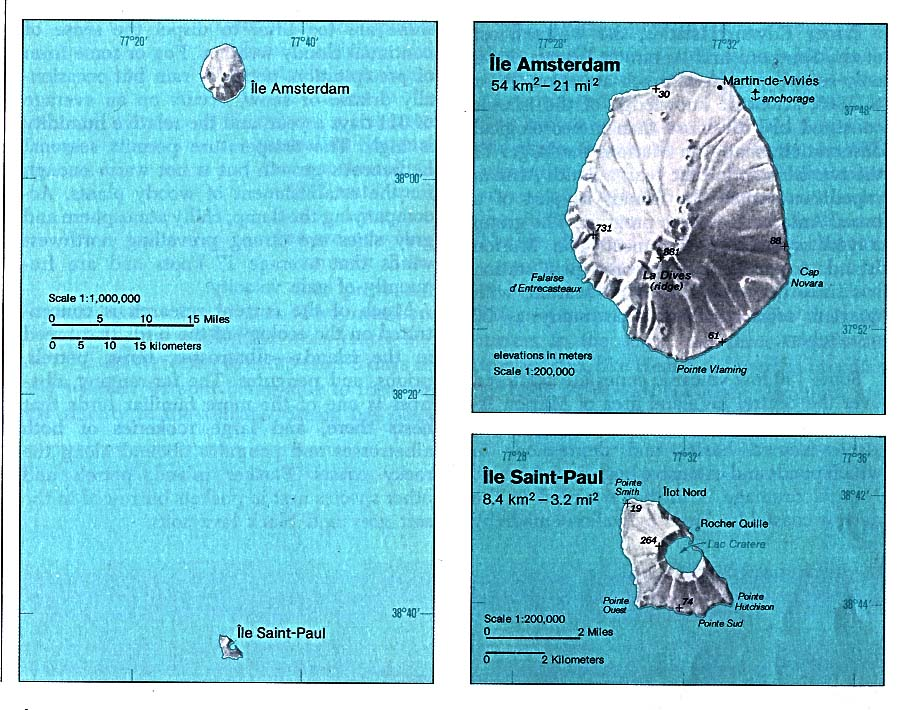
- Map of the islands

Ecology
- Realm: Afrotropical
- Biome: temperate grasslands, savannas, and shrublands

Geography
- Area: 69 km^{2} (27 sq mi)
- Country: France
- Overseas territory: French Southern and Antarctic Lands

Conservation
- Protected: 0 km^{2} (0%)

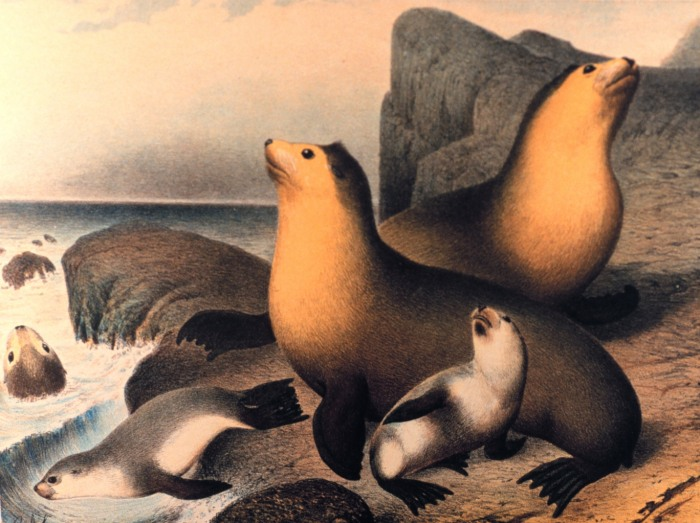
Southern fur seals on Amsterdam Island

The Amsterdam and Saint-Paul Islands temperate grasslands is a temperate grasslands, savannas, and shrublands ecoregion comprising Île Amsterdam and Île Saint-Paul, two volcanic islands in the southern Indian Ocean.

== Setting ==
Île Amsterdam and Île Saint-Paul are two volcanoes 83 km from each other lying in the centre of a triangle between Australia, Antarctica and southern Africa. The islands are remote, situated about 3000 km (1860 mi) from each neighbouring continent. They have cool oceanic climates with temperatures ranging from 13 °C (55 °F) in August to 17 °C (63 °F) in February, rainfall of 1,100 mm (43 in), persistent westerly winds, and high humidity levels. The only way to visit the islands is on the French research vessel Marion Dufresne II which services the Martin-de-Viviès research station on Île Amsterdam.

== Flora ==
Plant life changes with elevation; at lower levels the volcanoes are covered with grass and tussock grasslands and sedge meadows and, on Amsterdam, the tree Phylica arborea mixed with ferns. Higher up, on the Plateau des Tourbières, there are shrubs, bogs, and mosses.

== Fauna ==
These isolated islands are not rich in wildlife diversity but are home to a large population of subantarctic fur seal. They are an important breeding ground for the Indian yellow-nosed albatross, flesh-footed shearwater, gentoo penguin, northern rockhopper penguin, great skua, Antarctic tern and the endemic Amsterdam albatross. They were formerly home to two endemic ducks: the Amsterdam wigeon and an undescribed species on Île Saint-Paul.

== Threats and conservation ==
Although the islands are remote and therefore safe from most human activity and pollution, several introduced species of flora and fauna have damaged the environment.

Amsterdam Island cattle, in particular, grazed on young and regenerating plants and trampled on bird eggs. Five cattle had been brought to Amsterdam in January 1871. They were abandoned later that year and subsequently increased to a wild population of 2,000. As part of the French Southern and Antarctic Lands the islands are home to a research base which is working to preserve the original plant and animal life. Initially, they restricted the cattle to the northern half of Amsterdam. When the discovery was made in 2007 that the native flora and fauna had returned to the areas no longer grazed by the cattle, a plan to cull the remaining cattle on the island was launched in 2008. By 2010, the eradication program was complete, and no cattle remain on the island. The cattle population itself had become of scientific interest as it was a rare example of a completely feral herd of cattle.

Humans have caused other damage to the islands' ecosystems, as much of Amsterdam's woodland was cleared in the 18th and 19th centuries by whalers, sealers, and visitors from passing ships and is struggling to recover. Seal populations have recovered from commercial seal hunting and are no longer threatened.
