= Visser Hill =

Visser Hill (66°45′S 67°44′W) is a hill 2.5 nautical miles (4.6 km) south of Mount Velain in northern Adelaide Island. Mapped from air photos taken by Ronne Antarctic Research Expedition (RARE) (1947–48) and Falkland Islands and Dependencies Aerial Survey Expedition (FIDASE) (1956–57). Named by United Kingdom Antarctic Place-Names Committee (UK-APC) for Philipp C. Visser (1882–1955), Dutch diplomat and mountaineer who made classic investigations of glaciers in the Karakoram (1921–35).
