= Plateau des Tourbières =

Upland region of Amsterdam Island, Indian Ocean

Coordinates: 37°51′S 77°33′E

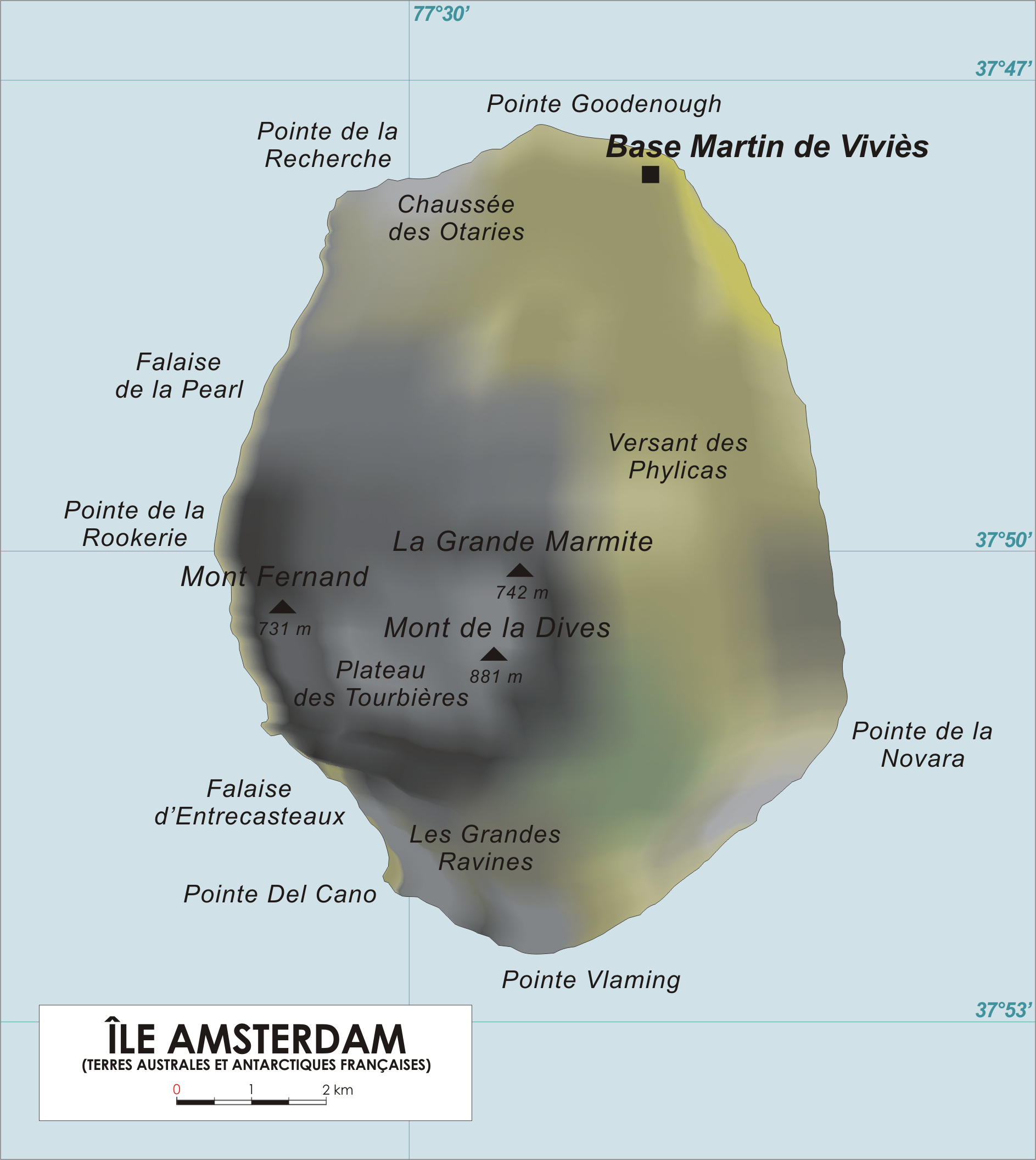
Amsterdam Island, showing the Plateau des Tourbières taking up much of the western (left-hand) side of the island

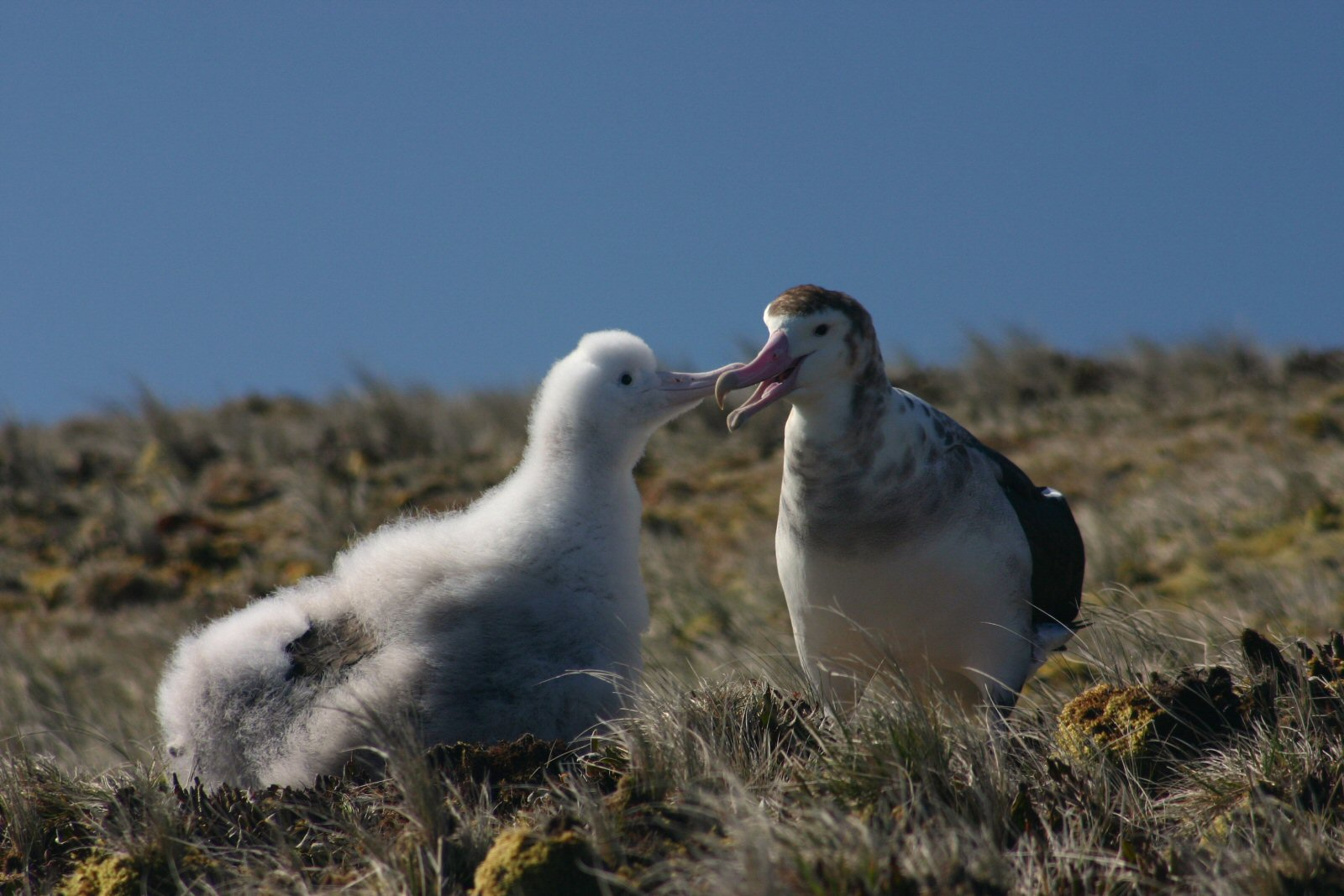
Amsterdam albatross feeding its chick

The Plateau of Bogs (French: Plateau des Tourbières [plato de tuʁbjɛʁ]) comprises the highest upland region of Amsterdam Island, a small French territory in the southern Indian Ocean. Over 500 metres (1,600 ft) above sea level, it contains the island's highest peaks: Mont de la Dives (881 metres or 2,890 feet), Grande Marmite (742 metres or 2,434 feet) and Mont Fernand (731 metres or 2,398 feet).

== Environment ==
The lower-lying areas of the island were mainly covered by a woodland of Phylica arborea trees mixed with ferns before the vegetation was reduced by a combination of wood-cutting, anthropogenic wildfire and grazing by feral cattle, and became replaced by exotic grassland, except about 10 ha of residual woodlands in 1988. The vegetation of the plateau, however, was not grazed by the cattle and remains in a largely natural state, consisting mainly of sphagnum bogs and mosses, with the dwarf shrub Acaena magellanica.

=== Important Bird Area ===
The plateau has been identified as an 800-hectare (2,000-acre) Important Bird Area (IBA) by BirdLife International because it is the only breeding site in the world for the critically endangered Amsterdam albatross. The species has a biennial breeding system with an average of 20 pairs breeding each year in a loose colony on the plateau. The total population of the albatross is about 150 individuals. The only other bird present is the brown skua, with some 40 breeding pairs.

== Sources ==
- Berteaux, D.; Micol, T. (1992). "Population studies and reproduction of the feral cattle (Bos taurus) of Amsterdam Island, Indian Ocean" (PDF). Journal of Zoology. 228 (2): 265–276. doi:10.1111/j.1469-7998.1992.tb04607.x. Archived from the original (PDF) on 13 August 2011.
- "Important Bird Areas factsheet: Plateau des Tourbières". BirdLife International. 2012.
- "Diomedea amsterdamensis". IUCN Red List of Threatened Species. Version 2010. IUCN. 2010.
