= Blümcke Knoll =

Blümcke Knoll (66°50′S 68°0′W) is a small steep-sided feature protruding through the ice of northern Adelaide Island, off the Antarctic Peninsula. It is about 11 nautical miles (20 km) southwest of Mount Velain.

It was mapped from air photos taken by the Ronne Antarctic Research Expedition (1947–48) and the Falkland Islands and Dependencies Aerial Survey Expedition (1956–57),

It was named by the UK Antarctic Place-Names Committee after Adolf Blümcke (1854–1914), a German glaciologist who was a professor in the Oberrealschule at Augsburg.
