= Yellow-nosed albatross =

Yellow-nosed albatross may refer to:

Birds of genus Thalassarche:

- Atlantic yellow-nosed albatross, T. chlororhynchos
- Indian yellow-nosed albatross, T. carteri
