= Falaises d'Entrecasteaux =

Cliffs on Amsterdam Island, Indian Ocean

Coordinates: 37°51′S 77°31′E

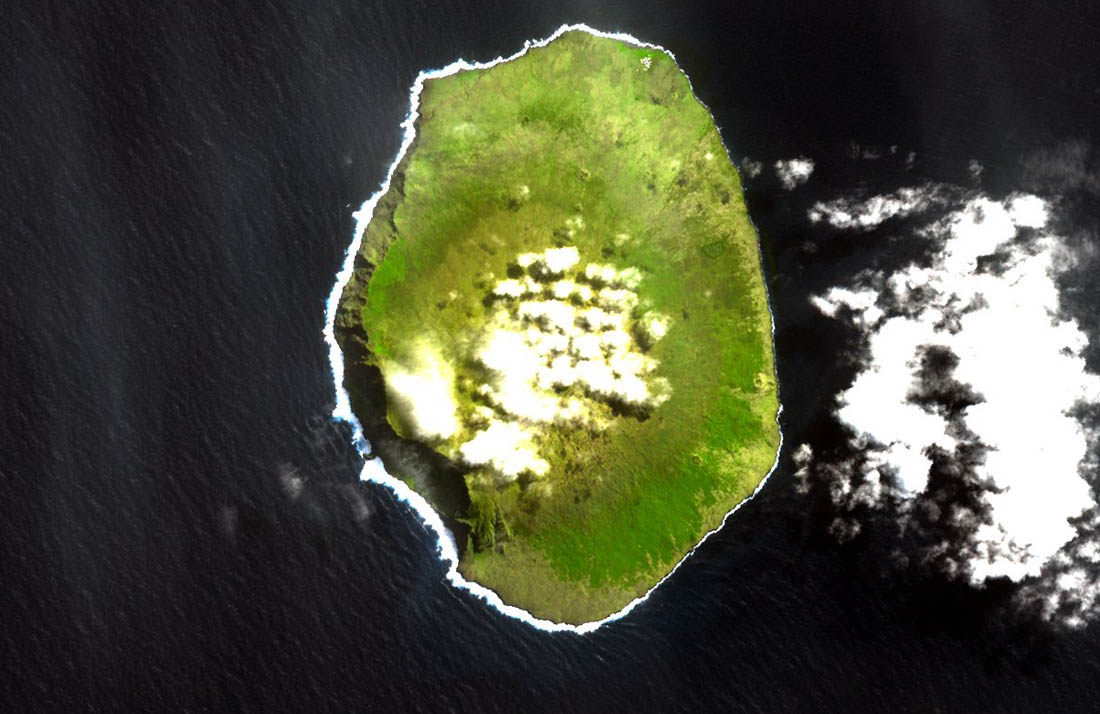
Satellite image of Amsterdam Island, showing the Falaises d'Entrecasteaux along the western (left-hand) coast of the island

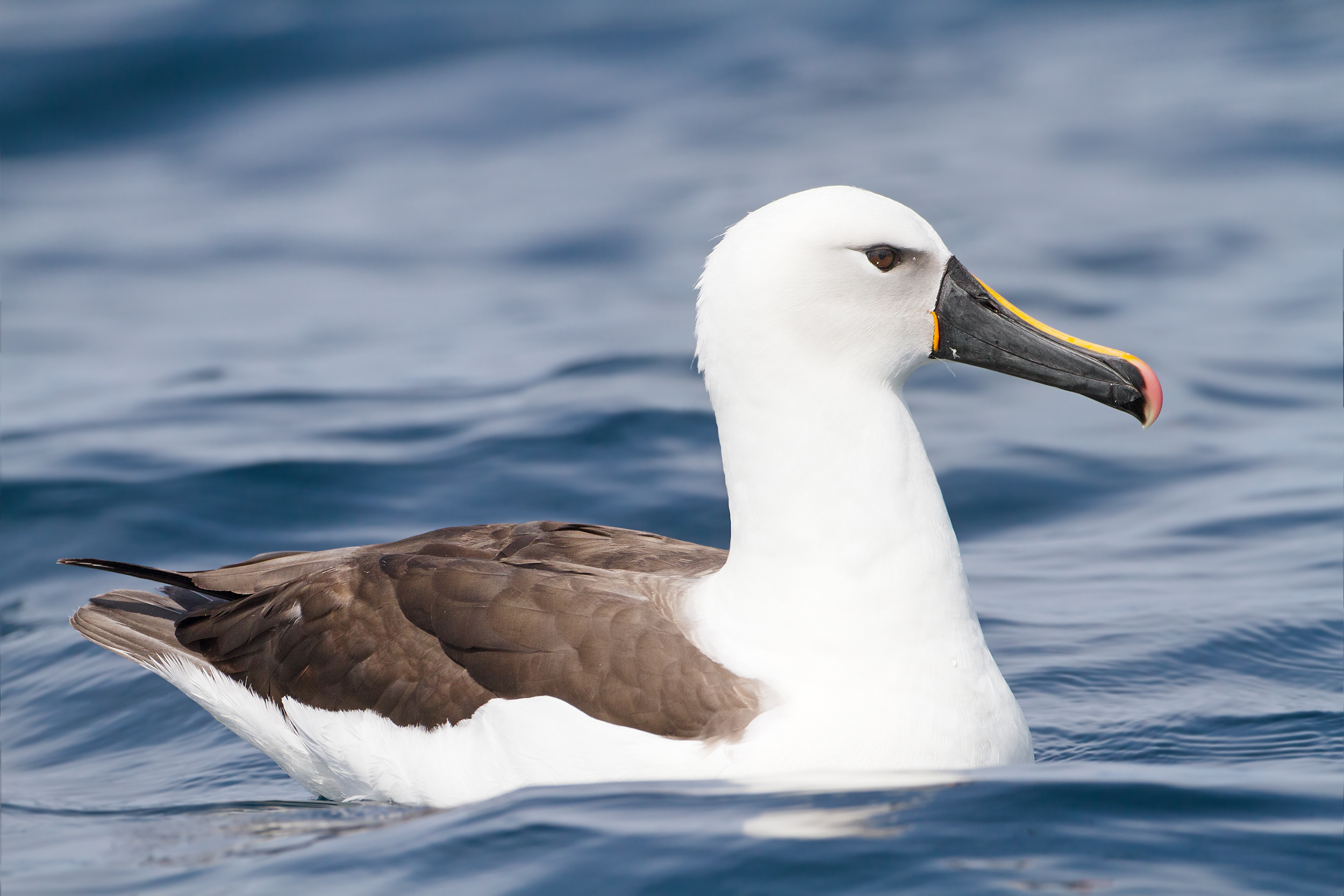
The cliffs are an important breeding site for Indian yellow-nosed albatrosses

The Cliffs of Entrecasteaux (French: Falaises d'Entrecasteaux [falɛz dɑ̃tʁəkasto]), named after 18th century French navigator Bruni d'Entrecasteaux, comprise the cliffs, which reach heights of over 700 metres (2,300 ft), along the west coast of Amsterdam Island, a small French territory in the southern Indian Ocean.

== Important Bird Area ==
The western coastline of the island, including the cliffs, has been identified as a 360-hectare (890-acre) Important Bird Area (IBA) by BirdLife International because it is home to one of the largest colonies of Indian yellow-nosed albatrosses in the world, with about 19,000 pairs constituting some 20% of the world population, and about 240 pairs of sooty albatrosses. There is also a large colony of northern rockhopper penguins, with 25,000 pairs. Two species, grey and soft-plumaged petrels, which have become rare on the island due to predation by rats and cats, are thought to breed in the IBA. There is a large rookery of subantarctic fur seals in the IBA. Ten endemic arthropods have been recorded.

The vegetation, which includes three endemic plant species, is dominated by tussock-grasses and rushes which are densest towards the foot of the cliffs. Because of the inaccessibility of the cliffs, the vegetation of the cliff-ledges was never grazed by the feral cattle that used to inhabit the island.

== Sources ==
- "BirdLife International - conserving the world's birds". Archived from the original on 10 July 2007.
- "Important Bird Areas factsheet: Falaises d'Entrecasteaux". BirdLife International. 2012.
