= Mount Machatschek =

Mountain in Graham Land, Antarctica

Mount Machatschek (66°52′S 68°4′W) is a prominent, mainly snow-covered mountain in northern Adelaide Island, Antarctica, about 14 nautical miles (26 km) southwest of Mount Velain. It was mapped from air photos taken by the Ronne Antarctic Research Expedition (1947–48) and the Falkland Islands and Dependencies Aerial Survey Expedition (1956–57), and was named by the UK Antarctic Place-Names Committee after Austrian geomorphologist Fritz Machatschek (1876–1957), who was the joint author with Erich von Drygalski of Gletscherkunde, 1942.
