= Île Amsterdam =

Island in the southern Indian Ocean

Nickname: Nouvelle Amsterdam ('New Amsterdam')
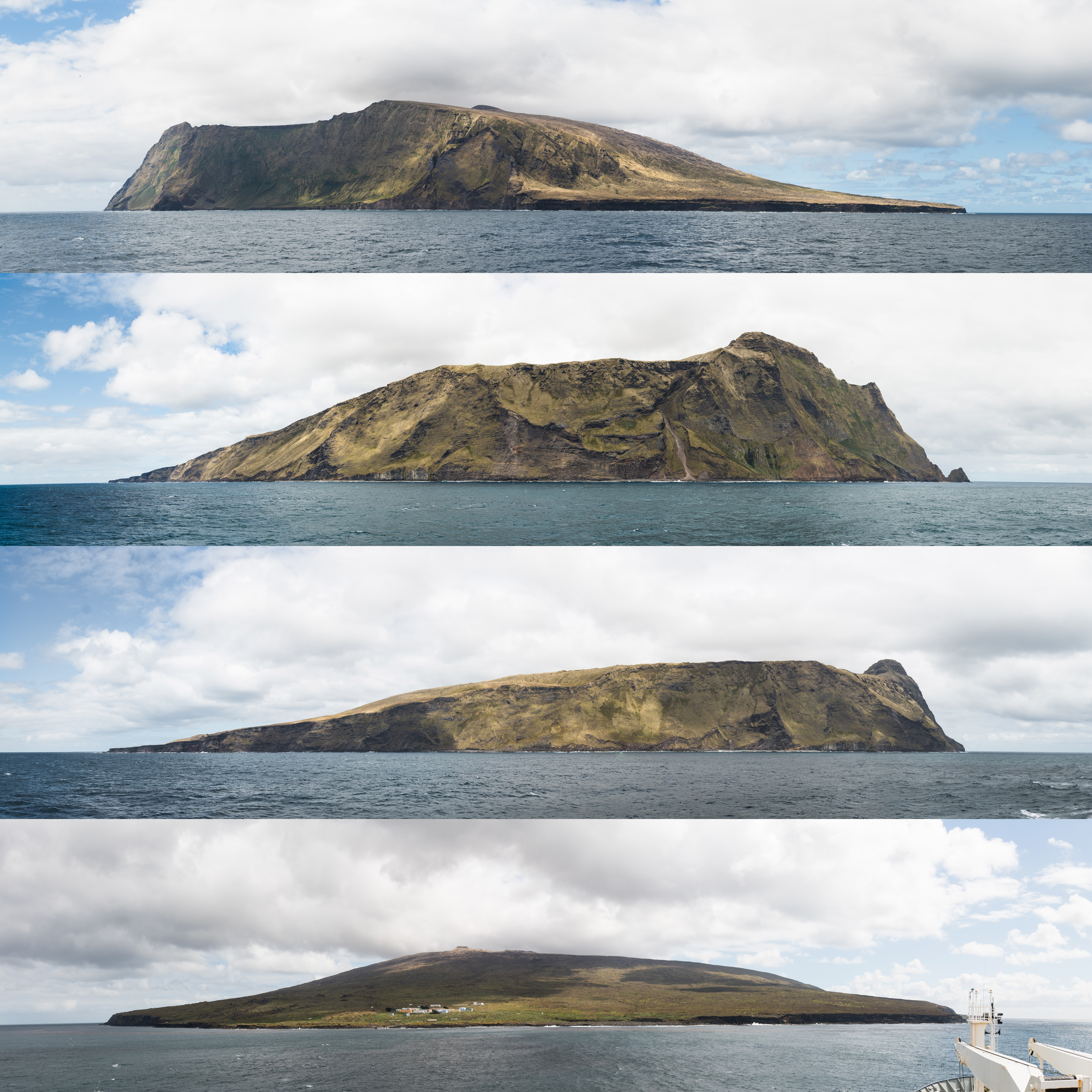
- South, west, northwest and north coasts of Île Amsterdam

- Location within Indian Ocean
- Other name: Amsterdam Island

Geography
- Location: Indian Ocean
- Coordinates: 37°50′S 77°33′E
- Area: 56.6 km^{2} (21.9 sq mi)
- Length: 10 km (6 mi)
- Width: 7 km (4.3 mi)
- Highest elevation: 867 m (2844 ft)
- Highest point: Mont de la Dives

Administration
- France
- Overseas territory: French Southern and Antarctic Lands
- District: Saint Paul and Amsterdam Islands

Demographics
- Population: 28

UNESCO World Heritage Site
- Part of: French Austral Lands and Seas
- Criteria: Natural: vii, ix, x
- Reference: 1603bis-003
- Inscription: 2019 (43rd Session)

Île Amsterdam (French pronunciation: [ilamstɛʁdam]), also known as Amsterdam Island or New Amsterdam (French: Nouvelle-Amsterdam), is an island of the French Southern and Antarctic Lands in the southern Indian Ocean that together with neighbouring Île Saint-Paul 90 kilometres (56 mi) to the south forms one of the five districts of the territory.

The island is roughly equidistant to the land masses of Madagascar, Australia, and Antarctica – as well as the British Indian Ocean Territory and the Cocos (Keeling) Islands (about 3,200 kilometres (2,000 mi) from each). It is the northernmost volcanic island within the Antarctic Plate.

The research station at Martin-de-Viviès, first called Camp Heurtin and then La Roche Godon, is the only settlement on the island and is the seasonal home to about thirty researchers and staff studying biology, meteorology, and geomagnetics.

== History ==
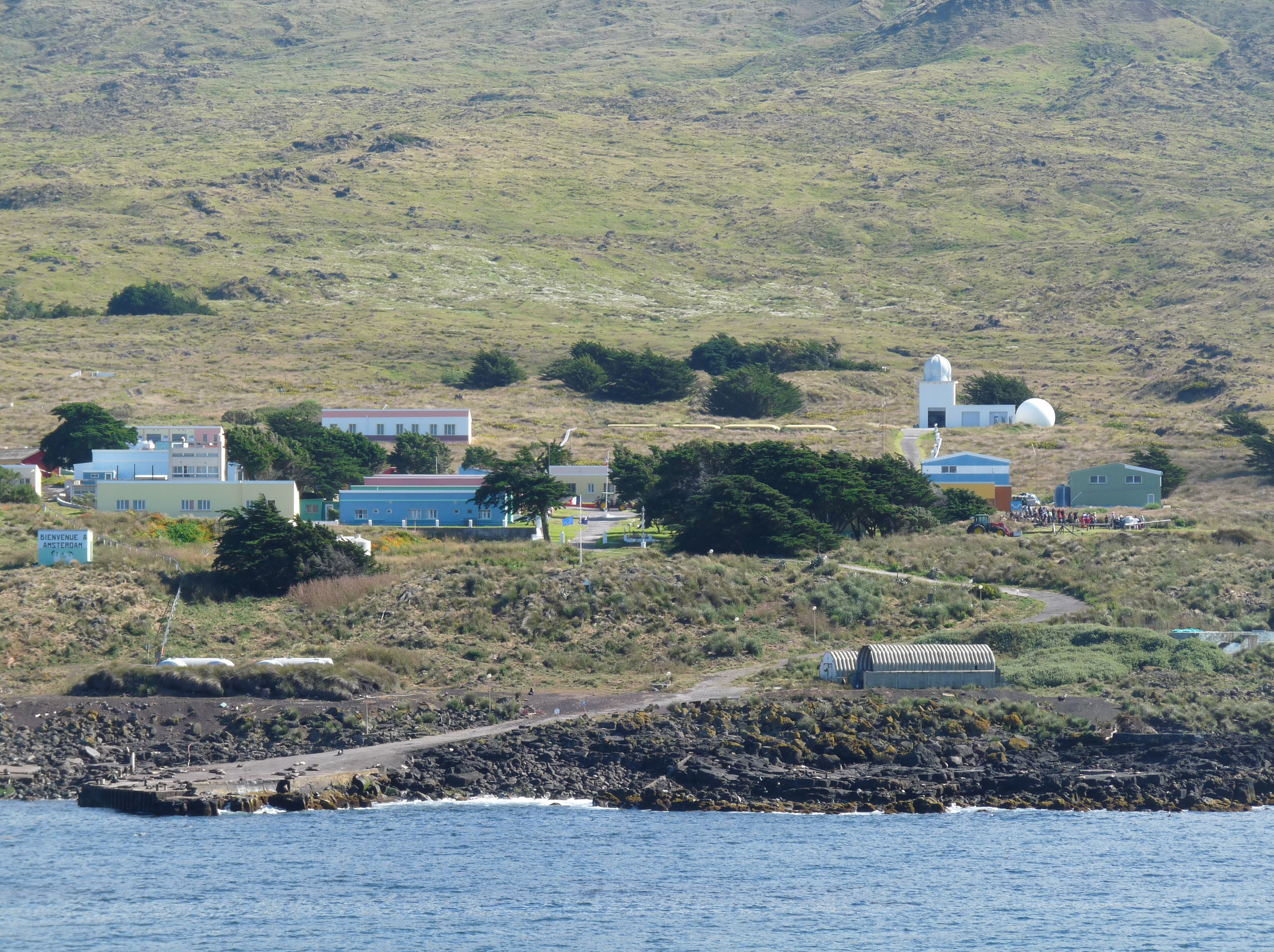
Martin-de-Viviès in 2008

The first person known to have sighted the island was the Spanish explorer Juan Sebastián Elcano, on 18 March 1522, during his circumnavigation of the world. Elcano called it Desesperanza (lit. 'Despair'), because he couldn't find a safe place to land and his crew was desperate for water after 40 days of sailing from Timor. On 17 June 1633, Dutch colonial governor and mariner Anthonie van Diemen sighted the island, and named it after his ship, Nieuw Amsterdam. The first recorded landing on the island occurred in December 1696, led by the Dutch explorer Willem de Vlamingh.

French mariner Pierre François Péron wrote that he was marooned on the island between 1792 and 1795. Péron's Memoires, in which he describes his experiences, were published in a limited edition, now an expensive collector's item. However, Île Amsterdam and Île Saint-Paul were often confused at the time, and Péron may have been marooned on Saint-Paul.

Amsterdam and St. Paul islands were recommended in 1786 for a convict settlement by Alexander Dalrymple, the Examiner of Sea-Journals for the East India Company, when the British government was considering New South Wales and Norfolk Island for such a settlement. An investigation of those islands was subsequently undertaken in December 1792 and January 1793 by George Lord Macartney, Britain's first ambassador to China, during his voyage to that country, and he concluded that they were not suitable for settlement.

Sealers are said to have landed on the island, for the first time, in 1789. Between that date and 1876, 47 sealing vessels are recorded at the island, 9 of which were wrecked. Relics of the sealing era can still be found.

The island was a stop on the British Macartney Embassy on its voyage to China in 1793.

On 11 October 1833, the British barque Lady Munro was wrecked at the island. Of the 97 persons aboard, 21 survivors were picked up two weeks later by a US sealing schooner, General Jackson.

John Balleny in command of the exploration and sealing vessel Eliza Scott visited the island in November 1838 in search of seals. He returned with a few fish and reported having seen the remains of a hut and the carcass of a whale.

The islands of Île Amsterdam and Île Saint-Paul were first claimed by France in June 1843. A decree of 8 June 1843 mandated the Polish captain Adam Mieroslawski to take into possession and administer in the name of France both islands. The decree as well as the ship's log from Olympe from 1 and 3 July 1843, stating that the islands had been taken into possession by Mieroslawski, are still preserved.

However, the French government renounced its possession of the islands in 1853.

In January 1871 an attempt to settle the island was made by a party led by Heurtin, a French resident of Réunion. After seven months, their attempts to raise cattle and grow crops were fruitless, and they returned to Réunion, abandoning the cattle on the island.

In May 1880 HMS Raleigh circumnavigated the island searching for missing ship Knowsley Hall. A cutter and gig were despatched to the island to search for signs of habitation. There was a flagpole on Hoskin Point and 45–65 m (50–70 yards) north were two huts, one of which had an intact roof and contained three bunks, empty casks, an iron pot and the eggshells and feathers of sea-birds. There was also an upturned serviceable boat in the other hut, believed to belong to the fishermen who visited the island.

In 1892, the crew of the French sloop Bourdonnais, followed by the ship L'Eure in 1893, again took possession of Saint-Paul and Amsterdam Island in the name of the French government.

The island was attached to the French colony of Madagascar from 21 November 1924 until 6 August 1955 when the French Southern and Antarctic Lands was formed. (Madagascar gained independence in 1958.)

The first French base on Île Amsterdam was established in 1949, and was originally called Camp Heurtin. It is now the Martin-de-Viviès research station, named after Paul de Martin de Viviès who, with twenty-three others, spent the winter of 1949 on the island. The station was originally named Camp Heurtin and has been in operation since 1 January 1981, superseding the first station, La Roche Godon.

The Global Atmosphere Watch still maintains a presence on Île Amsterdam.

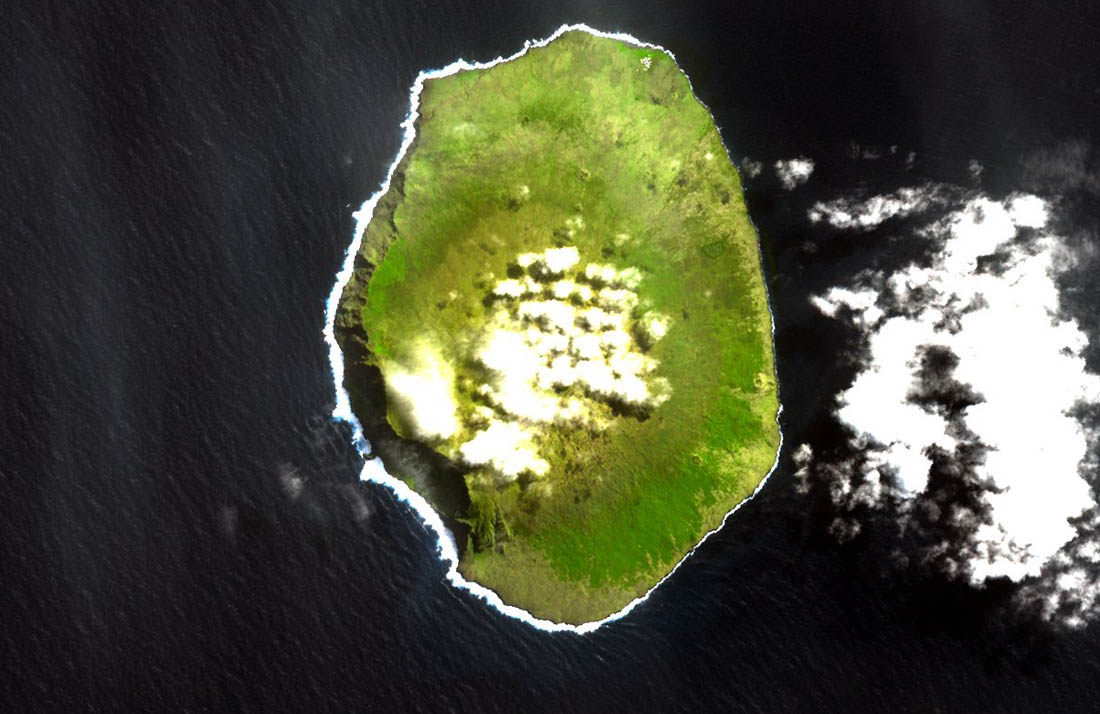
Satellite image of the island.

On 15 January 2025, a wildfire broke out on the island, forcing the evacuation of all 31 residents by boat to Réunion. Due to the island's remote location, the fire spread unchecked. By 10 February 45% of the island's area had been affected, while water supply and telecommunications infrastructure at the Martin-de-Viviès research station was damaged.

== Amateur radio ==
From 1987 to 1998, there were frequent amateur radio operations from Amsterdam Island. There was a resident radio amateur operator in the 1950s, using callsign FB8ZZ.

In January 2014 Clublog listed Amsterdam and St Paul Islands as the seventh most-wanted DXCC entity. On 25 January 2014 a DX-pedition landed on Amsterdam Island using MV Braveheart and began amateur radio operations from two separate locations using callsign FT5ZM. The DX-pedition remained active until 12 February and achieved over 170,000 two-way contacts with amateur radio stations worldwide.

== Environment ==
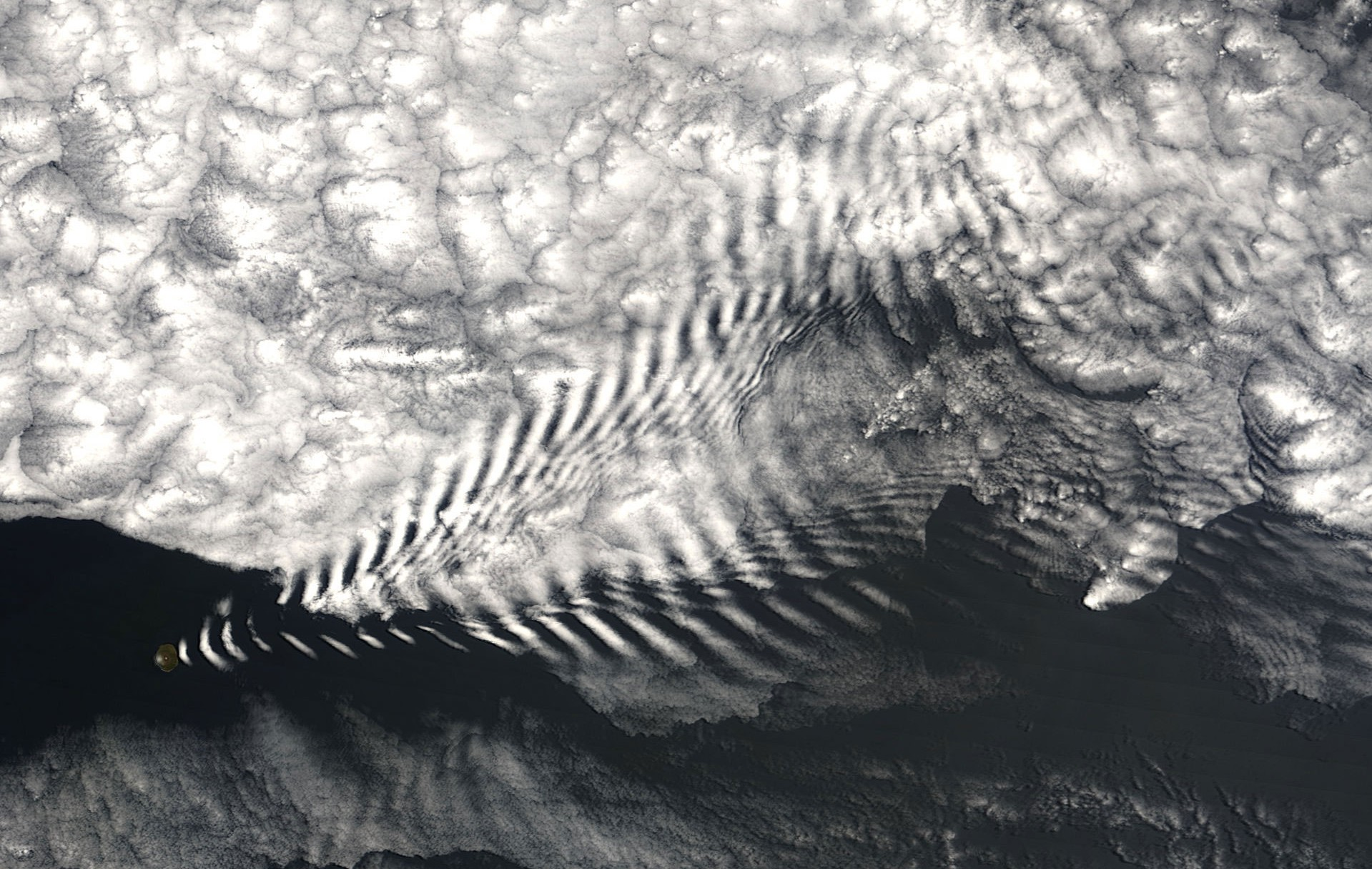
A large Kelvin wake cloud formation, caused by lee waves from Île Amsterdam (lower left).

=== Geography ===
The island is a potentially active volcano. It has an area of 56.6 km^{2} (21.9 mi^{2}), measuring about 10 km (6 mi) on its longest side, and reaches as high as 867 m (2,844 ft) at the Mont de la Dives. The high central area of the island, at an elevation of over 500 metres (1,600 ft), containing its peaks and caldera, is known as the Plateau des Tourbières (transl. Plateau of Bogs). The cliffs that characterise the western coastline of the island, rising to over 700 metres (2,300 ft), are known as the Falaises d'Entrecasteaux after the 18th-century French navigator Antoine Bruni d'Entrecasteaux.

There are no lakes nor rivers on the island; the only freshwater bodies are small ponds on the plateau. The low altitude areas are dry and fires have happened repeatedly.

==== Geology ====
Île Amsterdam vent, crater and caldera structures. Click on map to enlarge it where upon mouse over is enabled so selected structures can be identified. Zoom out accesses approximate surface projections of nearby submarine structures.

No historical eruptions are known, although the fresh morphology of the latest volcanism at Dumas Craters on the northeastern flank suggests it may have occurred as recently as the late 19th century. All the rocks are tholeiitic basalt and the oldest basalt sampled is no more than 720,000 years old.

There are two stratovolcanoes being Mont De La Dives which dominates and is younger and Le Mount du Fernand. Vents manifest as either cones or craters include Cratere Antonelli, Le Brulot, Le Chaudron, Le Cyclope, Crateres Dumas, Le Forneau, Cratere Inferieur, Grande Marmite, Cratere Hebert, Museau De Tanche, Cratere de l'Olympe, Cratere Superieur, Crateres Venus, and Cratere Vulcain (see map on this page).

The island is located on the mainly undersea Amsterdam–Saint Paul Plateau which is of volcanic hotspot origin. There is a magma chamber located at between 20–36 km (12–22 mi) depth below Amsterdam Island. The plateau which extends north west towards the Nieuw Amsterdam Fracture Zone (Amsterdam Fracture Zone) and south to beyond the island of St Paul with its presently known active area being delimited by the St. Paul Fracture Zone, is a 250 by 200 km (160 by 120 mi) feature of the sea floor near the Southeast Indian Ridge, which is an active spreading center between the Antarctic plate that the island lies on, and the Australian Plate. Helium isotopic compositional studies are consistent with its formation from the combined effects of accretion at the mid-ocean ridge ridge and mantle plume activity of a hot spot. This is either the Kerguelen hotspot or a potentially separate Amsterdam-Saint Paul hotspot but resolution of this issue is complicated by the recent volcanism on the island due to it being adjacent to the Southeast Indian Ridge. Recent authors have favoured a separate Amsterdam and St. Paul hotspot. There has been evidence at Boomerang Seamount to the north east of the island that Kerguelen-type source mantle exists beneath the Amsterdam and St. Paul Plateau. Whichever hot spot is responsible is moving south as Île Amsterdam rocks are older than St. Paul rocks. The Amsterdam–St. Paul Plateau while formed in the last 10 million years, started this formation beneath the Australian Plate so the island is built on the components of two tectonic plates.

=== Climate ===
Île Amsterdam has a mild, oceanic climate, Cfb under the Köppen climate classification, with a mean annual temperature of 14 °C (57.2 °F), annual rainfall of 1,100 mm (43 in), persistent westerly winds and high levels of humidity. Under the Trewartha climate classification the island is well inside the maritime subtropical zone due to its very low diurnal temperature variation keeping means high.

Climate data for Amsterdam Island (Martin-de-Vivies, 1991–2020 normals, extremes 1950–present)
Month	Jan	Feb	Mar	Apr	May	Jun	Jul	Aug	Sep	Oct	Nov	Dec	Year
Record high °C (°F)	26.1 (79.0)	26.2 (79.2)	24.8 (76.6)	23.4 (74.1)	21.0 (69.8)	20.3 (68.5)	18.2 (64.8)	17.7 (63.9)	23.9 (75.0)	19.2 (66.6)	22.4 (72.3)	24.8 (76.6)	26.2 (79.2)
Mean daily maximum °C (°F)	20.6 (69.1)	20.9 (69.6)	20.0 (68.0)	18.1 (64.6)	16.2 (61.2)	14.6 (58.3)	13.8 (56.8)	13.6 (56.5)	14.3 (57.7)	15.0 (59.0)	16.6 (61.9)	19.0 (66.2)	16.9 (62.4)
Daily mean °C (°F)	17.6 (63.7)	17.9 (64.2)	17.2 (63.0)	15.7 (60.3)	13.8 (56.8)	12.3 (54.1)	11.5 (52.7)	11.3 (52.3)	11.9 (53.4)	12.5 (54.5)	14.0 (57.2)	16.1 (61.0)	14.3 (57.7)
Mean daily minimum °C (°F)	14.5 (58.1)	15.0 (59.0)	14.5 (58.1)	13.2 (55.8)	11.5 (52.7)	10.1 (50.2)	9.2 (48.6)	8.9 (48.0)	9.5 (49.1)	10.0 (50.0)	11.3 (52.3)	13.2 (55.8)	11.7 (53.1)
Record low °C (°F)	6.1 (43.0)	4.5 (40.1)	6.0 (42.8)	4.3 (39.7)	3.8 (38.8)	3.0 (37.4)	1.8 (35.2)	1.9 (35.4)	2.1 (35.8)	3.1 (37.6)	4.7 (40.5)	1.7 (35.1)	1.7 (35.1)
Average precipitation mm (inches)	68.3 (2.69)	62.7 (2.47)	100.0 (3.94)	93.3 (3.67)	121.5 (4.78)	114.8 (4.52)	112.1 (4.41)	87.8 (3.46)	74.8 (2.94)	75.7 (2.98)	77.0 (3.03)	70.0 (2.76)	1,058 (41.65)
Average precipitation days (≥ 1.0 mm)	9.3	9.1	11.1	12.4	16.8	17.9	18.3	16.9	14.7	13.8	11.7	10.1	161.9
Average dew point °C (°F)	13 (55)	13 (55)	13 (55)	11 (52)	10 (50)	8 (46)	8 (46)	7 (45)	6 (43)	7 (45)	9 (48)	11 (52)	10 (49)
Mean monthly sunshine hours	177	145	134	110	107	99	104	121	123	141	150	170	1,581
Source 1: Météo France
Source 2: NOAA (sun 1961–1990), Meteo Climat (record highs and lows) Time and Date (dewpoints 2005–2015)

=== Flora and fauna ===
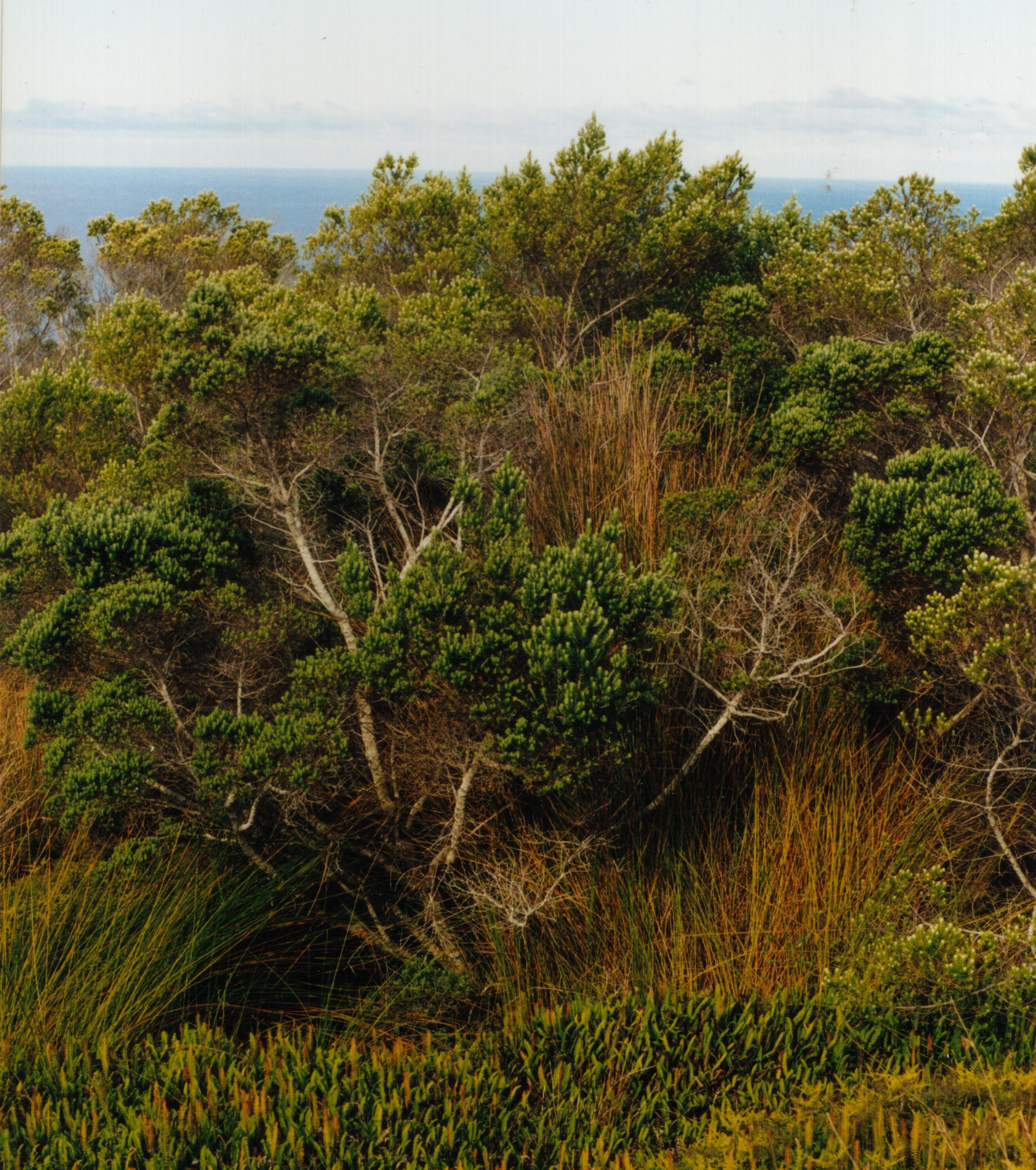
Phylica arborea grove

==== Vegetation ====
The main plant living on the slopes below 250 metres (820 ft) of altitude is the tussock grass species Poa novarae. Up to 600 metres (2,000 ft), sedges such as Scirpus nodosus and Spartina arundinacea build up thick grasslands. Beyond that altitude moss, sphagnum and Acaena magellanica dominate the vegetation.

Phylica arborea (Thouars) trees occur on Amsterdam, which is the only place where they form a low forest, although the trees are also found on Tristan da Cunha and Gough Island. It is called the Great Forest (Grand Bois). Before human presence, it covered the lowlands of the island, until forest fires set by sealers cleared much of it in 1825. The Phylica of Île Amsterdam were previously assigned to Phylica nitida (Lam.), but phylogenetic studies showed they do not belong to the same species as the Phylica nitida from highlands of Réunion and Mauritius.

From 1696 to 1988, the botanical composition of the coastal areas was deeply impacted by wildfires, wood-cutting, and by the introduction of alien plants and animals, especially cattle. Sailors from HMS Raleigh, who visit the island on 27 May 1880, describe the vegetation as:

Rough ground, grass several feet high, myrtle 10–15 feet [3–5 m] high in sheltered ravines, sedge, ferns (principally polypodium) and cabbages, grown into bushes with stumps several inches thick in the garden [...].

In the beginning of the 1980s, the population of Phylica is limited to a forest of about 5 ha and a few fragments; in 1988, it occupies 10 ha. From 1988 on, however, restoration interventions erect fences and later cattle is removed, while over 7000 Phylica arborea are planted.

==== Birds ====
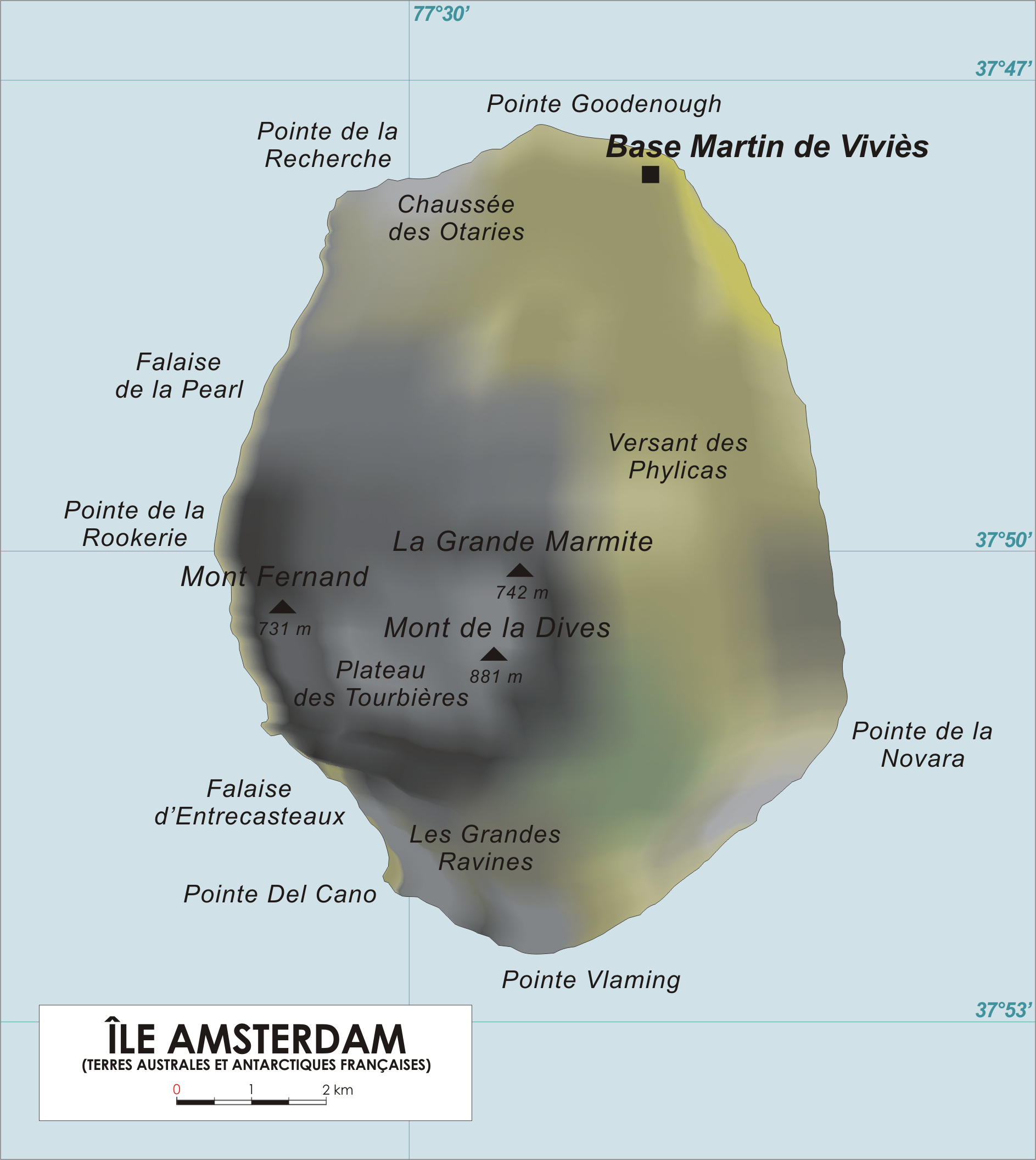
Terrain map of the island showing the research base.

The island is home to the endemic Amsterdam albatross, which breeds only on the Plateau des Tourbières. Other rare species are the brown skua, Antarctic tern and western rockhopper penguin. The Amsterdam duck is now extinct, as are the local breeding populations of several petrels. There was once possibly a species of rail inhabiting the island, as a specimen was taken in the 1790s (which has been lost), but this was either extinct by 1800 or was a straggler of an extant species. The common waxbill has been introduced. Both the Plateau des Tourbières and Falaises d'Entrecasteaux have been identified as Important Bird Areas by BirdLife International, the latter for its large breeding colony of Indian yellow-nosed albatrosses.

==== Mammals ====
There are no native land mammals. Subantarctic fur seals and southern elephant seals breed on the island. Introduced mammals include the house mouse, brown rat and feral cats.

A distinct breed of wild cattle, Amsterdam Island cattle, also inhabited the island from 1871 to 2010. They originate from the introduction of five animals by Heurtin during his brief attempt at settlement of the island in 1871 and increase to an estimated 2,000 in both 1952 and 1988. Following recognition that the cattle were damaging the island ecosystems, a fence was built restricting them to the northern part of the island in 1988. In 2007 it was decided to eradicate the population of cattle entirely, resulting in the slaughter of the cattle between 2008 and 2010. Subsequently, native plants gradually recolonized the lowlands, and the population of Amsterdam Island albatrosses recovered from 5 breeding pairs in 1983 to 51 in 2018.

Since the 18th century on, rodents and feral cats introduced by humans have been significant threats to native wildlife. Rats prey on invertebrates and on the eggs and chicks of seabirds, they are vectors of disease, such as outbreaks of fowl cholera among Indian yellow-nosed albatross chicks, and they damage saplings, while mice eat seeds.

An eradication campaign of these invasive species was started in 2020. Cats were removed between 2020 and 2022. Rodents were trapped from December 2021 on. Poisoned bait was spread in 2024.

With this campaign, the survival rate of Indian yellow-nosed albatross chicks in the end of March 2023 amounts to 52%, while it was 4% in 2019 and 2020. The population of Amsterdam Island albatrosses recovered from 51 breeding pairs in 2018 to 80 in 2025.

== See also ==
- List of volcanoes in French Southern and Antarctic Lands
- French overseas departments and territories
- Administrative divisions of France
- List of French islands in the Indian and Pacific oceans
