= Mont de la Dives =

Mountain in France

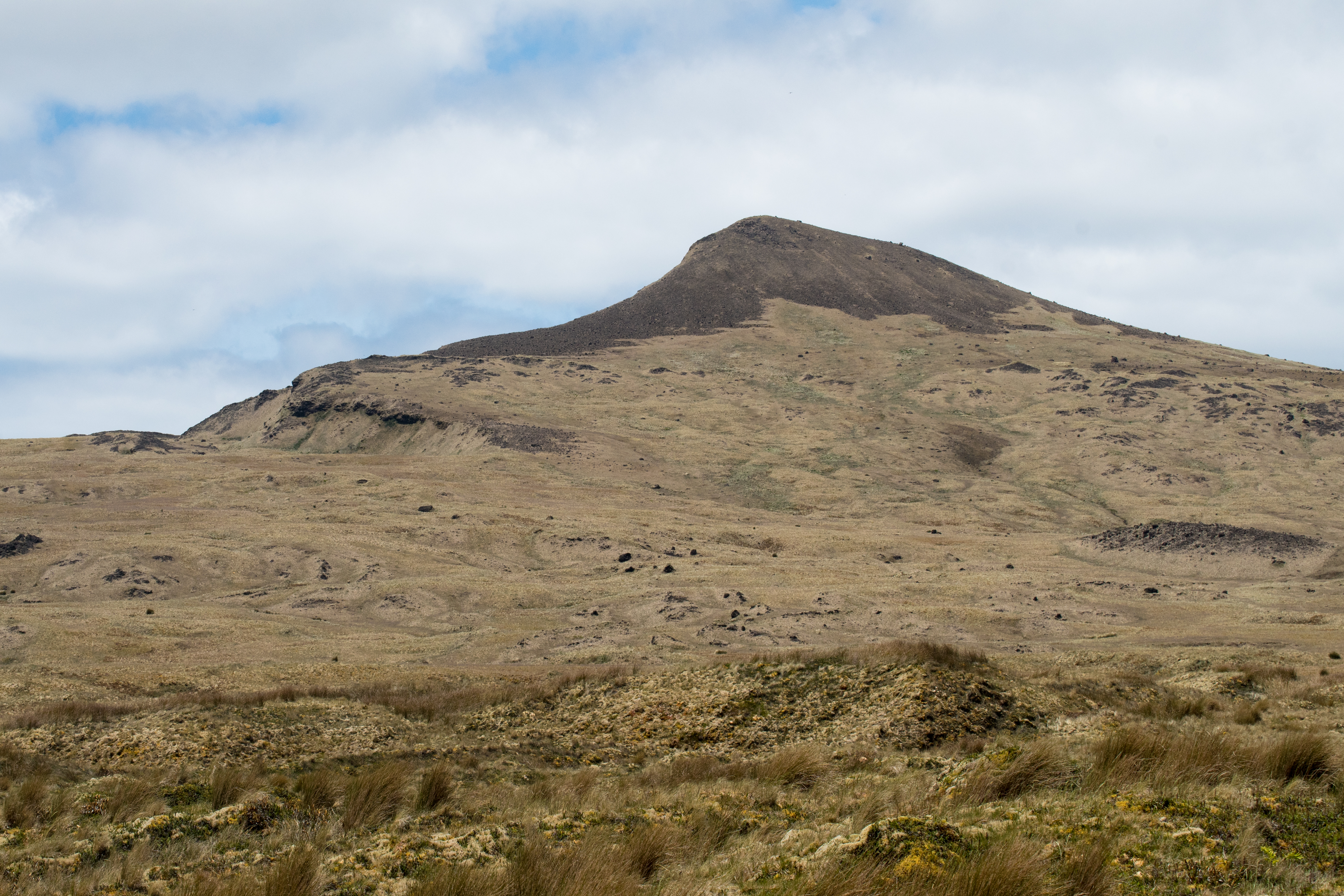
- View of the Mont de la Dives from the Plateau des Tourbières

Highest point
- Elevation: 881 m (2,890 ft)
- Prominence: 881 m (2,890 ft)
- Isolation: 1,408.72 km (875.34 mi)
- Coordinates: 37°50′56″S 77°32′55″E

Geography
- Location within Indian Ocean
- Location: Amsterdam Island, French Southern and Antarctic Lands
- Parent range: Plateau des Tourbières

Geology
- Mountain type: Rift volcano

Climbing
- First ascent: unknown

Mont de la Dives is the highest mountain in Amsterdam Island, French Southern and Antarctic Lands, Indian Ocean.

== Geography ==
This 881 m (2,890 ft) high peak rises in the Plateau des Tourbières above the western shore of Amsterdam Island. The mountain has a cliff dropping steeply to the waters of the Indian Ocean off its western side less than 2 kilometers (1.2 mi) from the peak.

== See also ==
- List of islands by highest point
- Topographic isolation
