= Charles Vélain =

French geologist and geographer

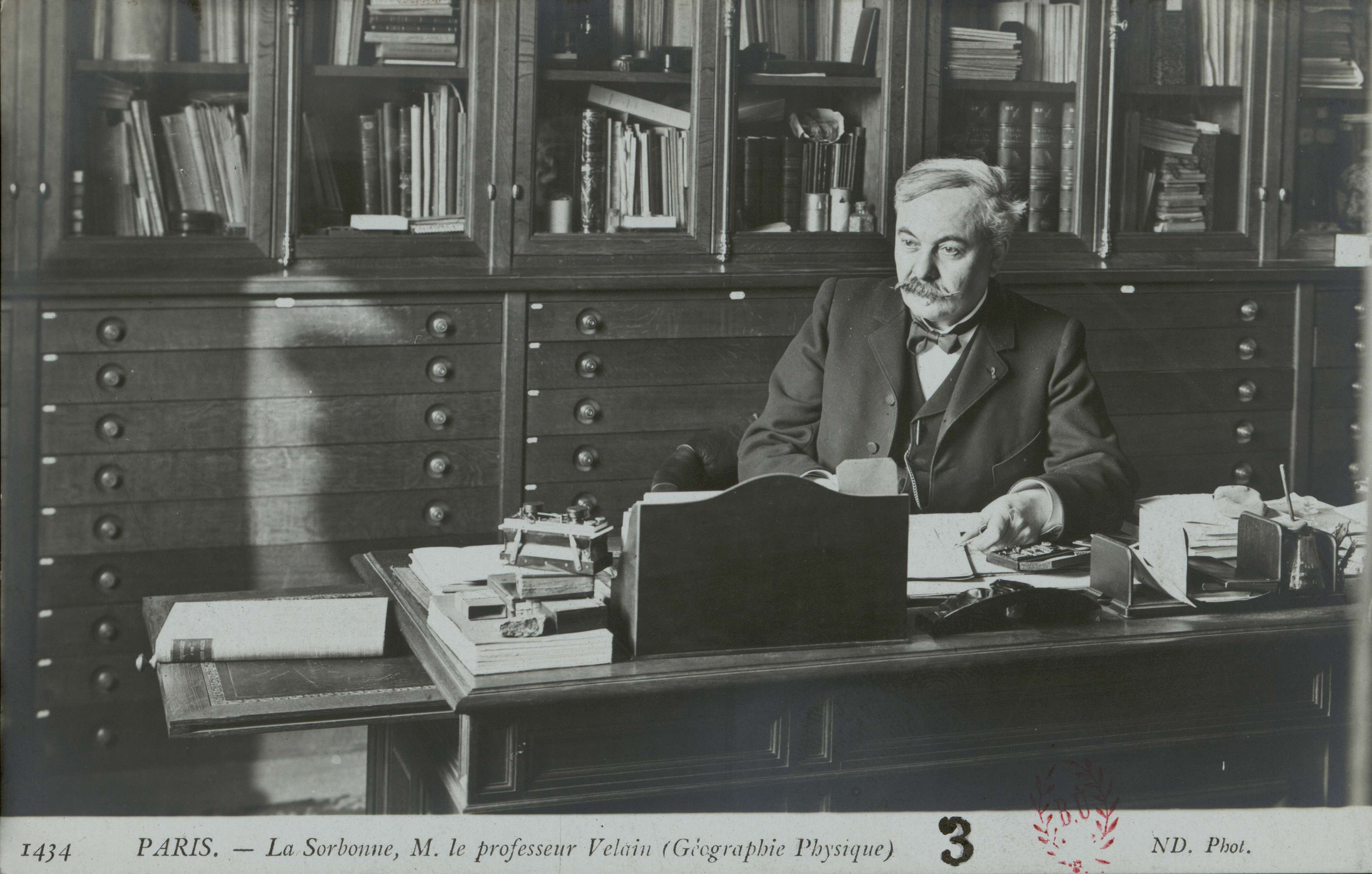
The Sorbonne. Professor Vélain - Physical geography (Bibliothèque de la Sorbonne, NuBIS)

Charles Vélain (16 May 1845 – 6 June 1925) was a French geologist and geographer. He was born in Château-Thierry.

Charles Vélain's route to the field of geology was an unusual one. He was a student of pharmacy. He studied geology later at the Sorbonne. He was part of several explorations, during which he studied various geological factors that would later bring him fame. Vélain's major contributions in the field of geology were in petrography and physical geography. He was an authority on volcanism. His works in this particular field earned him numerous accolades such as the Delalande Guérineau prize of the French Academy of Sciences in 1877.

Charles Vélain also enjoyed a successful career as a scholar. He worked as a lecturer for several years. He also authored several scientific papers and articles. He wrote mostly on geology, petrology and physical geography, with volcanoes remaining his subject of interest and expertise. Some of his works include 'Volcanoes' (Paris, 1884), 'The Earthquakes' (Paris, 1887), and 'Petrology Conferences' (Paris, 1889).

The contributions of Charles Vélain were commemorated in 1963 by naming a peak in the Rally du Baty Peninsula as Mount Velain.

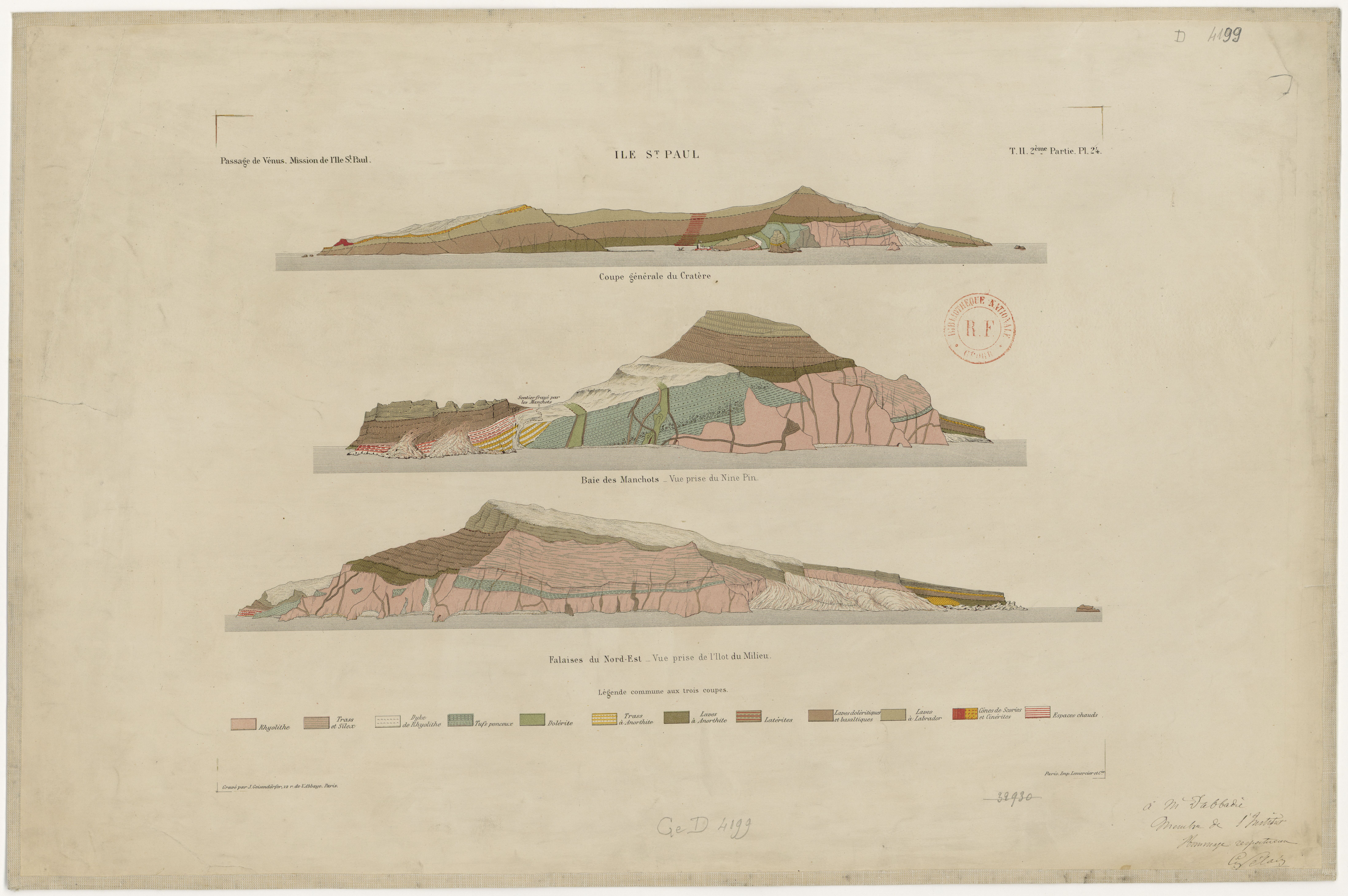
Geology of l'île St Paul. From Vélain (1878a)

== Selected publications ==
- Vélain, Charles (1878a). Description géologique de la Presqu'île d'Aden, de l'île de la Réunion, des îles Saint-Paul et Amsterdam. Paris: Typographie A. Hennuyer.
- Vélain, Charles (1878b). Remarques sur la faune des îles Saint-Paul et Amsterdam, suivies d'une description des mollusques testacés de ces deux îles. Paris: Typographie A. Hennuyer.
