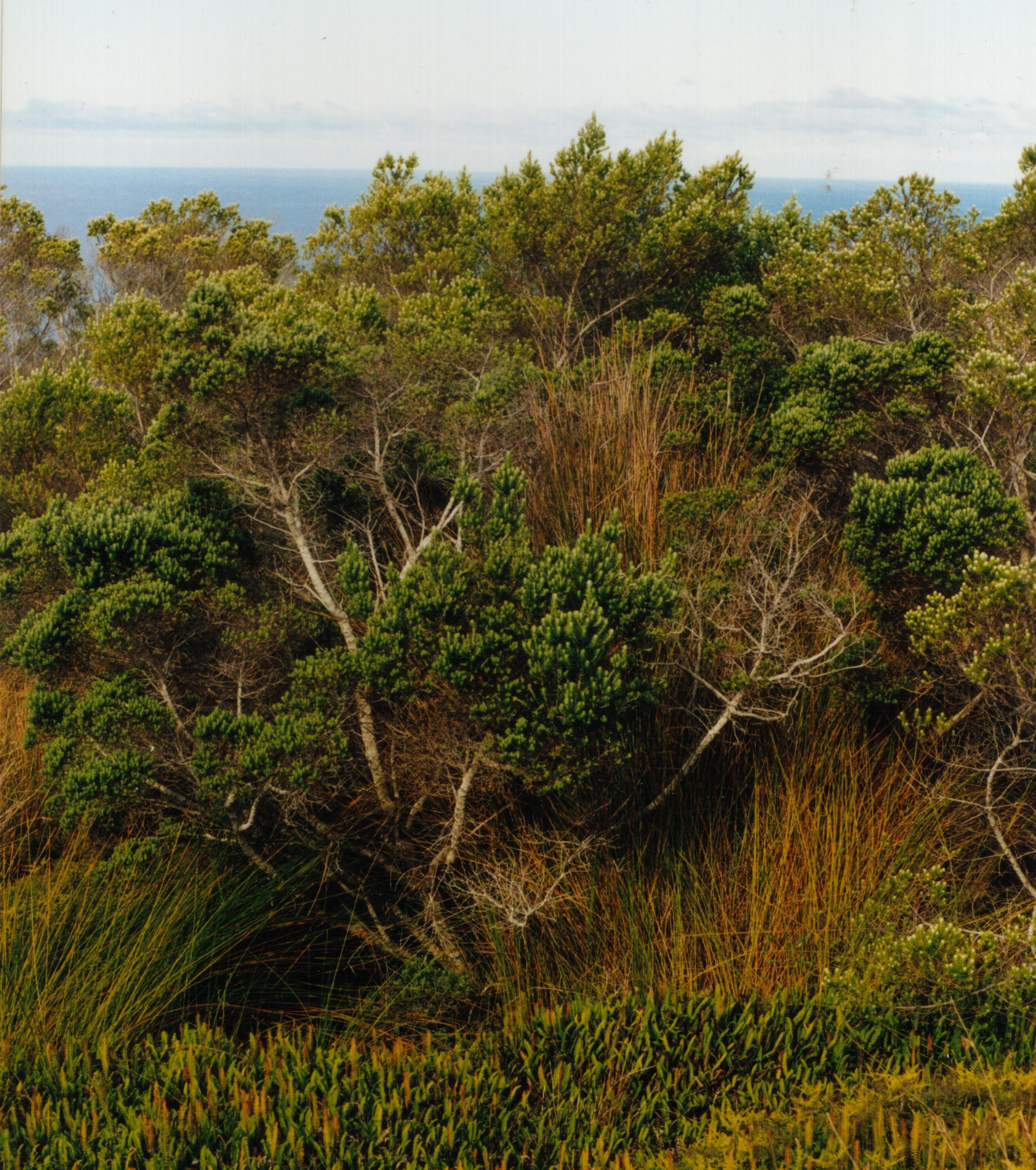
- Phylica arborea shrubs on Amsterdam Island

Conservation status
- Endangered (IUCN 3.1)

Scientific classification
- Kingdom: Plantae
- Clade: Tracheophytes
- Clade: Angiosperms
- Clade: Eudicots
- Clade: Rosids
- Order: Rosales
- Family: Rhamnaceae
- Genus: Phylica
- Species: P. arborea

Binomial name
- Phylica arborea Thouars

Synonyms
- Soulangia arborea (Thouars) G.Don

= Phylica arborea =

Species of shrub

Phylica arborea, also known as the Island Cape myrtle, is a shrub or small tree found on several isolated oceanic islands in the South Atlantic and Indian oceans.

== Description ==
The plant has narrow needle-like dark green leaves, downy silver on the underside, and with greenish white terminal flowers. Usually a shrub or procumbent tree, it may reach 6–7 m in height in sheltered locations.

== Distribution ==
It is found on various subantarctic islands, including the Tristan da Cunha group and Gough Island in the South Atlantic Ocean, as well as on Amsterdam Island in the southern Indian Ocean.

=== Amsterdam Island ===
Phylica arborea is the only woody plant on Amsterdam Island, now growing mainly on the eastern slope of the island. Formerly it covered a much larger area. In 1726, Valentyn described a Phylica forest in the form of a belt between 100–250 meters in altitude and an area of 1 500 ha (approximately 27% of the island's surface). This forest was so dense that getting through was virtually impossible. In 1875, Vélain estimated that the forest still covered a maximum of 250 hectares.

The last volcanic eruption of 1792 and the resulting fires may have been the reason for the disappearance of the Amsterdam Island forest. In the mid-1980s, only a few fragments of the former forest remained.

The extreme decline in the Phylica population is primarily the result of human deforestation, fires, and grazing by the feral cattle that Heurtin (a colonist from Réunion) had released in 1871. After cattle were eradicated in the south of the island in 1988 and fences installed, a protection program allowed the planting of 7000 trees, using seeds from the relict population. Today the Grand Bois – a protected area – is the last dense Phylica stand on the eastern slope, covering an area of just 10 hectares (0.2% of the island's area)
