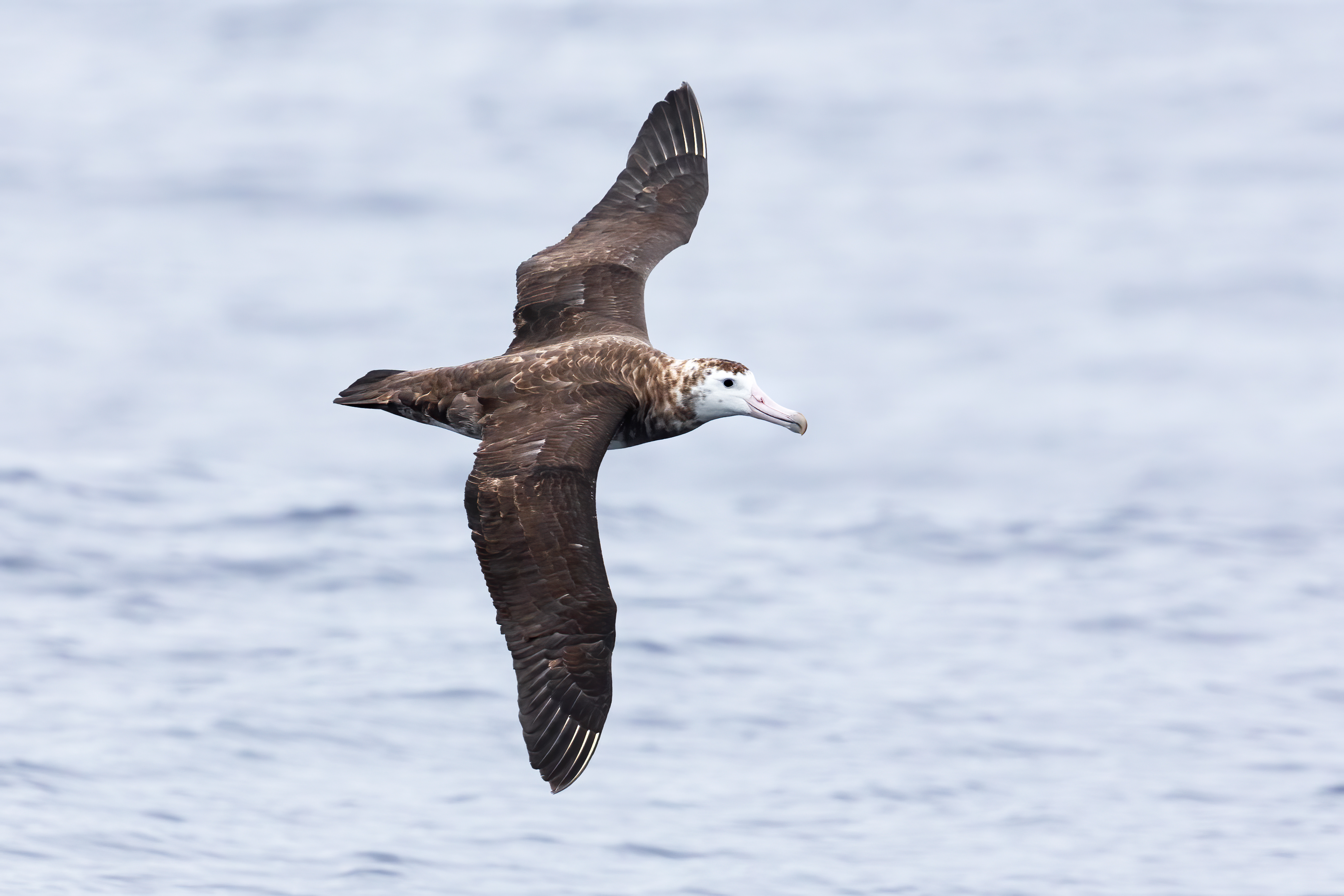
- Adult in flight
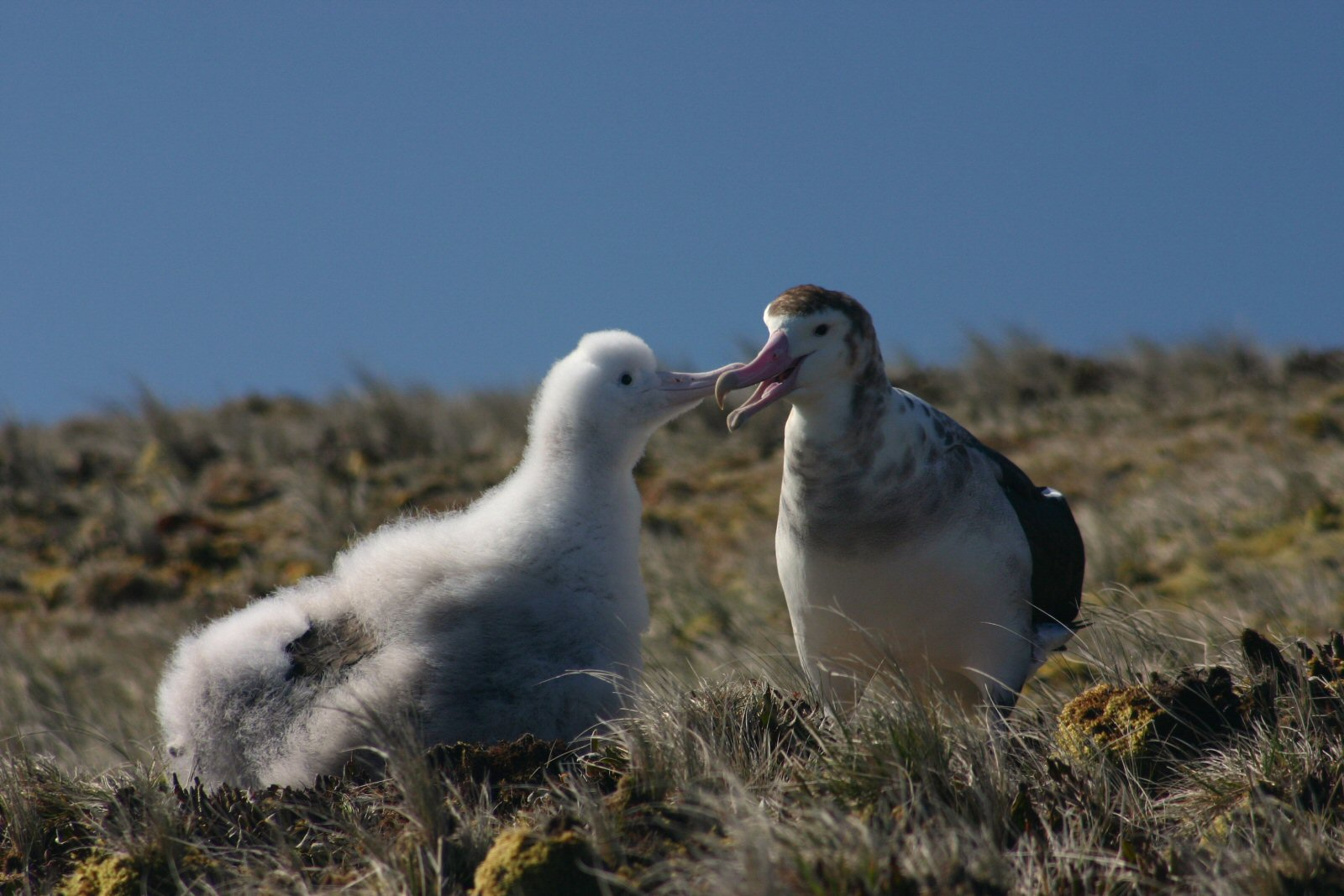
- Amsterdam albatross feeding chick

Conservation status
- Endangered (IUCN 3.1)

Scientific classification
- Kingdom: Animalia
- Phylum: Chordata
- Class: Aves
- Order: Procellariiformes
- Family: Diomedeidae
- Genus: Diomedea
- Species: D. amsterdamensis

Binomial name
- Diomedea amsterdamensis Roux, JP, Jouventin, Mougin, Stahl & Weimerskirch, 1983

Synonyms
- Diomedea exulans amsterdamensis Roux, Jouventin, Mougin, Stahl & Weimerskirch 1983

= Amsterdam albatross =

Large bird which breeds only on Amsterdam Island in the southern Indian Ocean

The Amsterdam albatross or Amsterdam Island albatross (Diomedea amsterdamensis), is a large albatross which breeds only on Amsterdam Island in the southern Indian Ocean. It was only described in 1983, and was thought by some researchers to be a subspecies of the wandering albatross, D. exulans (now the snowy albatross). BirdLife International and the IOC recognize it as a species, James Clements does not, and the SACC has a proposal on the table to split the species. More recently, mitochondrial DNA comparisons between the Amsterdam albatross, the wandering albatross Diomedea exulans, the Antipodean albatross D. antipodensis and the Tristan albatross D. dabbenena, provide clear genetic evidence that the Amsterdam albatross is a separate species.

== Taxonomy ==
Albatrosses belong to the family Diomedeidae of the order Procellariiformes, along with shearwaters, fulmars, storm petrels, and diving petrels. They share certain identifying features. First, they have nasal passages attached to the upper bill called naricorns, although the nostrils on the albatross are on the sides of the bill. The bills of Procellariiformes are also unique in that they are split into between seven and nine horny plates. Finally, they produce a stomach oil made up of wax esters and triglycerides that is stored in the proventriculus. This is used against predators and serves as well as an energy-rich food source for chicks and for adults during their long flights.

The scientific name Diomedea amsterdamensis is composed of Diomedea, from the marooned Greek hero Diomedes, whose companions were turned to birds, and amsterdamensis, a Latin form of the name of the island where they are found.

== Description ==
The Amsterdam albatross is a great albatross that breeds in brown, rather than in the more usual white, plumage. This bird weighs 4.8 to 8 kg (11–18 lb) and is 107 to 122 cm (42–48 in) long with a wingspan of 280 to 340 cm (110–130 in). The adult bird has chocolate brown upper parts and is white on its face mask, throat, lower breast, and belly. It has a broad brown breast band along with brown undertail coverts. Its pink bill has a dark tip and dark cutting edges, and finally, its underwings are white except for the dark tip and the dark leading edge.

== Distribution and habitat ==
The Amsterdam albatross breeds only on Amsterdam Island, part of the French Southern Territories in the southern Indian Ocean, at an altitude of between 500–600 m (1,600–2,000 ft) above sea level on the Plateau des Tourbières. There is uncertainty regarding its whereabouts when it is not breeding, though there have been possible sightings in Australia and New Zealand.

== Behaviour ==
Because of its rarity, the feeding ecology and at-sea distribution of the Amsterdam albatross is not well understood, although it is believed that the birds eat squid, crustaceans, and fish. Off-duty birds during the incubation stage of the breeding cycle cover large areas of the Indian Ocean, traveling up to 2,400 km (1,500 mi).

=== Breeding ===
Amsterdam albatrosses breed biennially in the open marshy ground. Both parents incubate the egg in alternate stints that last for about a week, with the chick hatching after 80 days. The chick is brooded for a month and overall takes 230 days to fledge. At first, it is fed by its parents every three days, with the feeding frequency reduced as it approaches fledging. At the peak of weight gain, the chick weighs more than its parents but then loses weight as the extra reserves are used to grow feathers. Having fledged, the young bird stays at sea for around five years before returning to the colony and begins breeding a few years later. The breeding "language" of the Amsterdam albatross is similar to that of the snowy albatross.

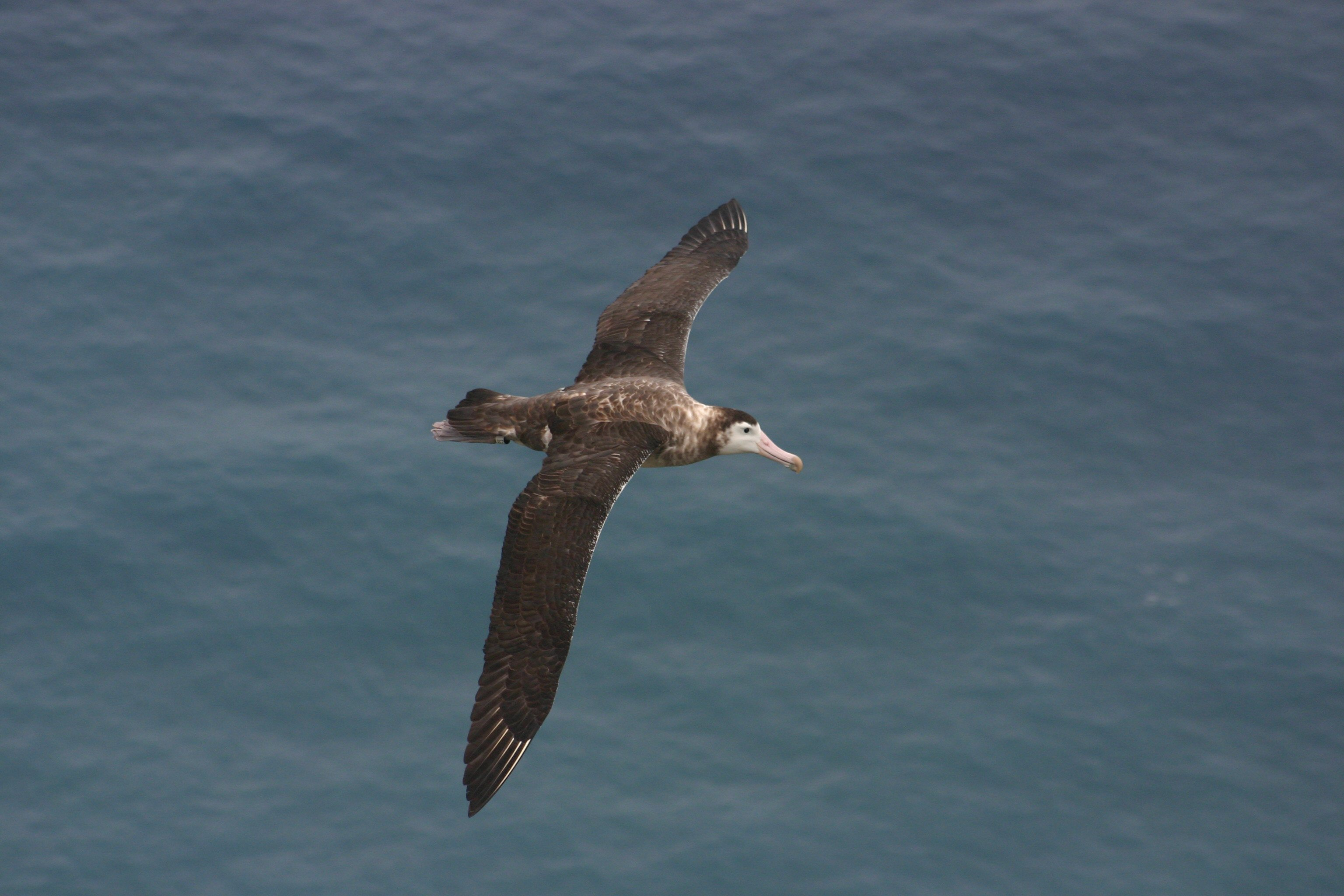
Adult in flight, showing dark plumage typical of the species

== Conservation ==
The Amsterdam albatross is listed as endangered by the IUCN, with an occurrence range of 4,400,000 km^{2} (1,700,000 sq mi) and a breeding range of only 7 km^{2} (2.7 sq mi). They are also considered endangered by the Bonn Convention, an international convention to conserve migratory species. The population upon discovery was just five breeding pairs; with conservation, this has increased to eighteen to twenty-five breeding pairs. Monitored continuously since 1983, the world population is estimated at 80 mature individuals and a total of some 130 birds. The island on which the albatross breeds has undergone a significant decline in habitat condition due to the introduction of ship rats, feral cats and cattle, while the birds are threatened at sea by the practice of longline fishing. The draining of a peat bog on the plateau has degraded the breeding environment, and because there is only one breeding location, they are also especially vulnerable to diseases such as Pasteurella multocida (avian cholera) and Erysipelothrix rhusiopathiae.

To help in conservation efforts, banding of the birds and frequent censuses are undertaken. Feral cattle were eliminated from Amsterdam Island in 2010.

Albatrosses (family Diomedeidae) are highly sensitive to adverse population effects since they are very long-lived seabirds with low fecundity and delayed sexual maturity. The worldwide decline of albatross populations coincided with the development of industrial long-line fisheries. Studies indicate that industrial fishing operations conducted close to seabird breeding grounds are more likely to impact populations, compared to fisheries operating further out to sea. Evidence suggests that the Amsterdam albatross population had been affected by long-line fisheries targeting southern bluefin tuna, between the mid-1960s and mid-1980s, while operations took place amidst the birds' feeding grounds. Based on bycatch rates for other albatross species, long-line fisheries have the potential to remove about 2–16 individuals (i.e. 5%) per year from the total Amsterdam population. In 2007, researchers estimated the population had grown to 167 individuals; this increase in abundance coincided with global decreases in long-line fishing throughout the southern oceans. To prevent fishing operations from impacting breeding populations, it is recommended that fishing should be conducted outside of the foraging area for breeding birds.

== Sources ==
- BirdLife International (2018). "Species Factsheet: Amsterdam Albatross (Diomedea amsterdamensis)". Data Zone.
- BirdLife International (2008b). "The BirdLife checklist of the birds of the world, with conservation status and taxonomic sources". Archived from the original (xls) on 18 October 2019.
- Clements, James (2007). The Clements Checklist of the Birds of the World (6th ed.). Ithaca, NY: Cornell University Press. ISBN 978-0-8014-4501-9.
- Double, M. C. (2003). "Procellariiformes". In Hutchins, Michael; Jackson, Jerome A.; Bock, Walter J.; et al. (eds.). Grzimek's Animal Life Encyclopedia. Vol. 8 Birds I Tinamous and Ratites to Hoatzins. Joseph E. Trumpey, Chief Scientific Illustrator (2nd ed.). Farmington Hills, MI: Gale Group. pp. 107–110. ISBN 0-7876-5784-0.
- Gotch, A. F. (1995) [1979]. "Albatrosses, Fulmars, Shearwaters, and Petrels". Latin Names Explained A Guide to the Scientific Classifications of Reptiles, Birds & Mammals. New York, NY: Facts on File. p. 190. ISBN 0-8160-3377-3.
- Rains, D.; Weimerskirch, H.; Burg, T. M. (January 2011). "Piecing together the global population puzzle of wandering albatrosses: genetic analysis of the Amsterdam albatross Diomedea amsterdamensis". Journal of Avian Biology. 42 (1): 69–79. doi:10.1111/j.1600-048X.2010.05295.x.
- Remsen Jr., J. V.; et al. (January 2009). "Proposal (388) to South American Classification Committee: Split Diomedea exulans into four species". South American Classification Committee. American Ornithologists' Union. Archived from the original on 21 February 2009.
- Elphick, Chris; Dunning Jr., John B.; Sibley, David Allen, eds. (2001). The Sibley Guide to Bird Life and Behavior. Illustrated by David Allen Sibley (First ed.). New York, NY: Alfred A. Knopf. ISBN 0-679-45123-4.
