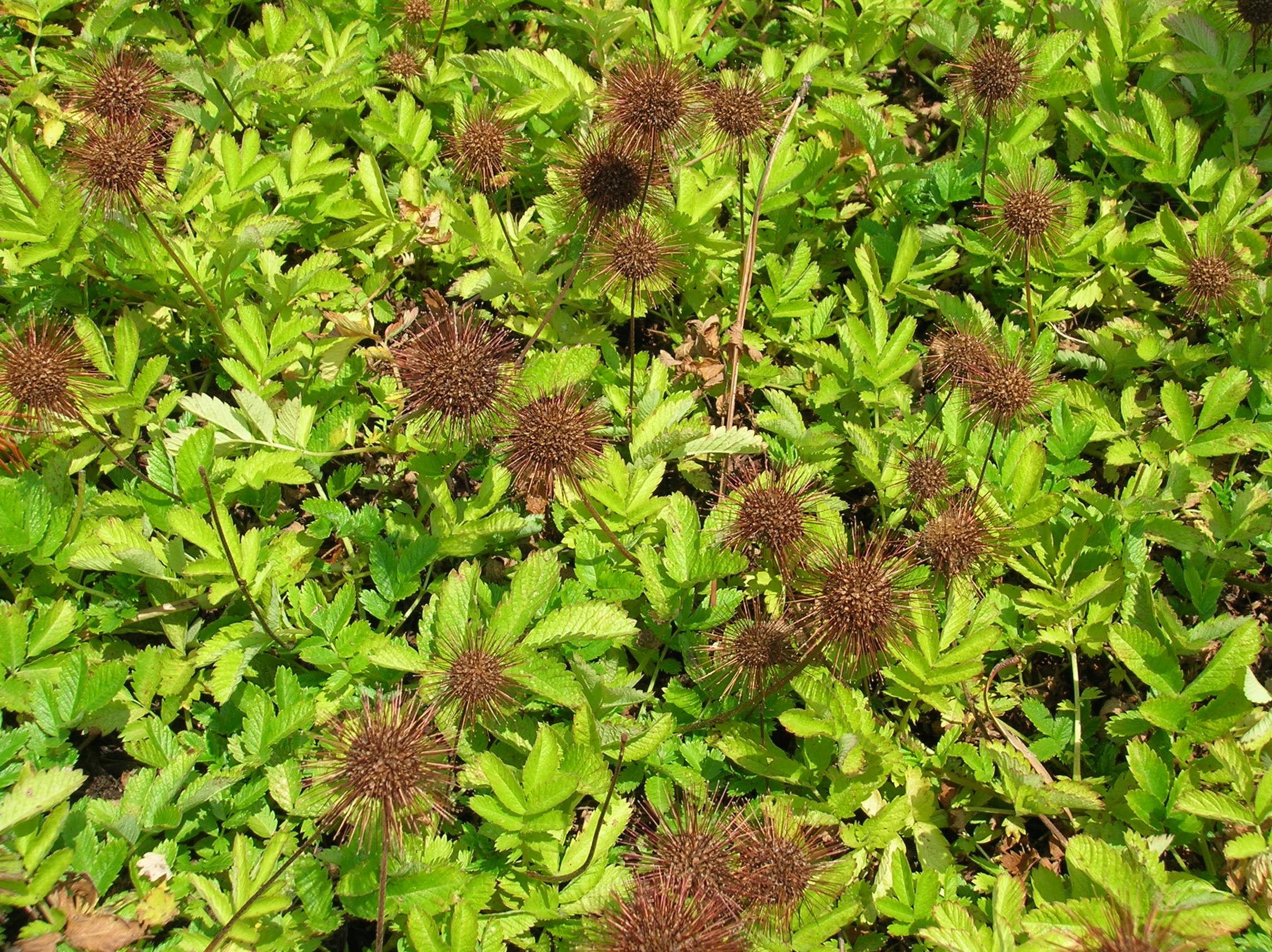
- Leaves and seed-heads

Scientific classification
- Kingdom: Plantae
- Clade: Embryophytes
- Clade: Tracheophytes
- Clade: Spermatophytes
- Clade: Angiosperms
- Clade: Eudicots
- Clade: Rosids
- Order: Rosales
- Family: Rosaceae
- Genus: Acaena
- Species: A. magellanica

Binomial name
- Acaena magellanica (Lam.) Vahl

Synonyms
- List: Acaena acroglochin Bitter; Acaena acutifida Bitter; Acaena adscendens Vahl; Acaena adscendens subsp. cardiostemon Bitter; Acaena adscendens subsp. georgiae-australis Bitter; Acaena adscendens var. incisa Bitter; Acaena adscendens var. luxurians Bitter; Acaena adscendens var. macrochaeta Franch.; Acaena adscendens var. majuscula Bitter; Acaena adscendens var. minuscula Bitter; Acaena adscendens var. semperpilosa Bitter; Acaena adscendens var. utrinqueglabrescens Bitter; Acaena affinis Hook.f.; Acaena alboffii Macloskie; Acaena basibullata Bitter; Acaena brachyglochin Bitter; Acaena cadilla Hook.f.; Acaena cadilla f. pusilla Bitter; Acaena canescens Phil.; Acaena chamacaena Bitter; Acaena closiana Gay; Acaena colchaguensis Bitter; Acaena compacta Hauman; Acaena coxi Phil.; Acaena depauperata Bitter; Acaena exaltata Bitter; Acaena floribunda Bitter; Acaena glandulifera Bitter; Acaena glaucella Bitter; Acaena grandistipula Bitter; Acaena grossifolia Bitter; Acaena hirta Citerne; Acaena humilis Bitter; Acaena ischnostemon Bitter; Acaena krausei Phil.; Acaena krausei subvar. glabratula Bitter; Acaena krausei var. hirsuta (Phil.) Reiche; Acaena krausei var. massonandra Bitter; Acaena laevigata W.T.Aiton; Acaena laevigata var. venulosa (Griseb.) Reiche; Acaena longiaristata H.Ross; Acaena longisepala Bitter; Acaena longistipula Bitter; Acaena macrophyes Bitter; Acaena macropoda Bitter; Acaena macrostemon Hook.f.; Acaena macrostemon var. basipilosa Bitter; Acaena macrostemon subsp. closiana (Gay) Bitter; Acaena macrostemon subsp. latisepala Bitter; Acaena macrostemon subsp. longiaristata (H.Ross) Bitter; Acaena magellanica var. glabrescens Bitter; Acaena magellanica subsp. grandiscapa Bitter; Acaena magellanica subsp. laevigata (Aiton) Bitter; Acaena magellanica var. pubescens Bitter; Acaena magellanica subsp. pygmaea Bitter; Acaena magellanica f. robusta Bitter; Acaena magellanica var. subtuspilosa Bitter; Acaena magellanica subsp. venulosa (Griseb.) Bitter; Acaena neglecta Bitter; Acaena nudicaulis Albov; Acaena obtusiloba Bitter; Acaena oligodonta Bitter; Acaena oligoglochin Bitter; Acaena oligomera Skottsb.; Acaena petiolulata Phil.; Acaena plioglochin Bitter; Acaena rubescens Bitter; Acaena sericascens Bitter; Acaena sericascens var. tenuibracteolata Bitter; Acaena subflaccida Bitter; Acaena subtusvillosula Bitter; Acaena tomentella Bitter; Acaena transitoria Bitter; Acaena triglochin Bitter; Acaena venulosa Griseb.; Ancistrum magellanicum Lam.

= Acaena magellanica =

Species of plant

Acaena magellanica, commonly called buzzy burr or greater burnet, is a species of flowering plant whose range includes the southern tip of South America and many subantarctic islands.

== Description ==
Acaena magellanica is a perennial, mat-forming plant with creeping stems, up to 14 cm (6 in) high. The leaves are oblong to linear-lanceolate, with 5 to 10 pairs of ovate leaflets. The flower heads are globular and grow on wiry stems well clear of the foliage. They are followed by brown, prickly seed heads; the seeds have small hooks which enables them to adhere to clothing, feathers or fur.

== Distribution and habitat ==
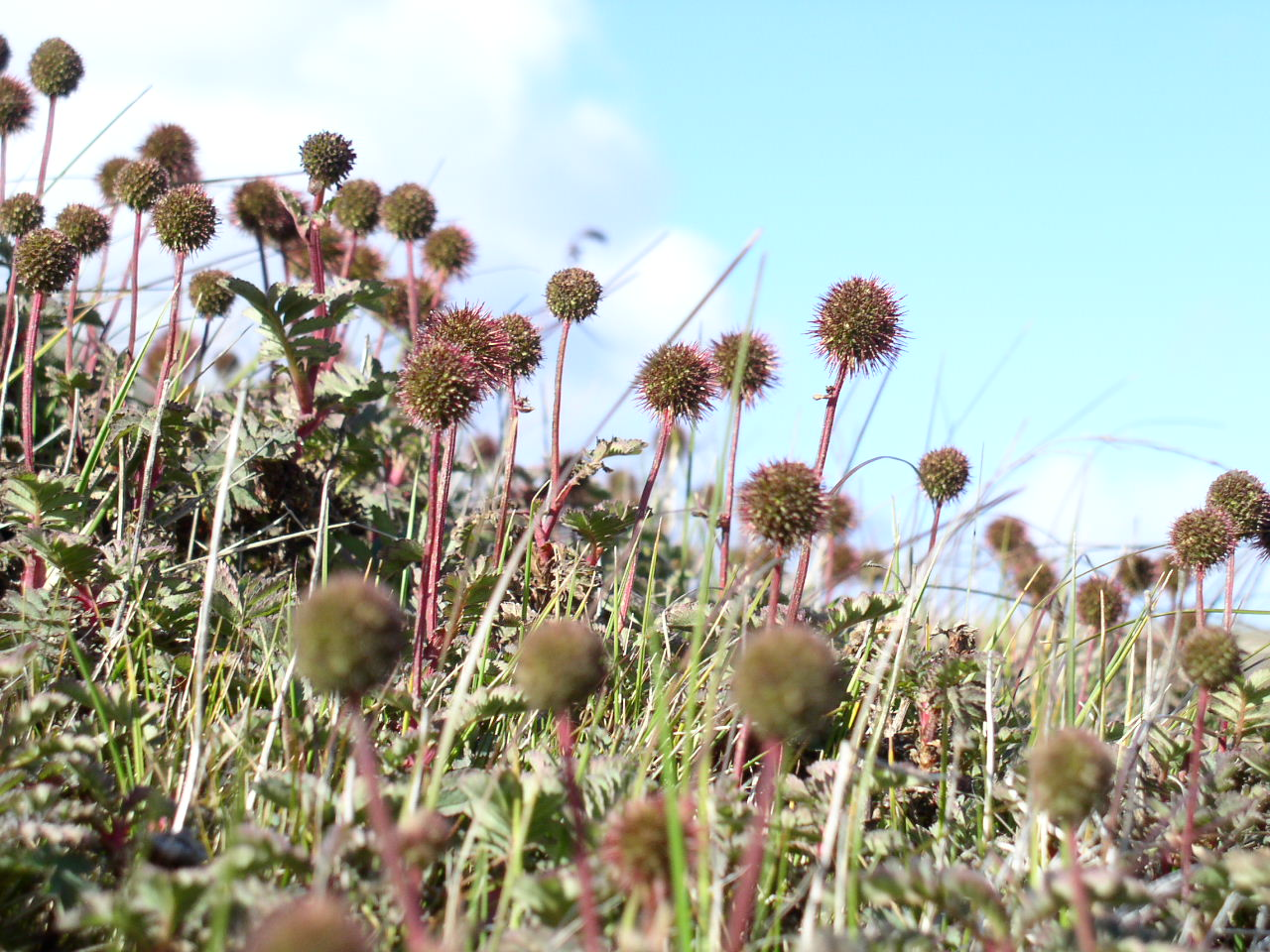
Acaena magellanica on Crozet Islands.

The species is native to the southern part of South America. Its range includes Argentina, Chile and various sub-Antarctic islands including the Falkland Islands, the Kerguelen Islands, the Prince Edward Islands, Crozet Islands, South Georgia and the South Sandwich Islands, Macquarie Island and the Heard Island and McDonald Islands. Its typical habitat is damp places such as the edge of bogs, the banks of streams, waterlogged places, meadows and forest margins. It grows from sea level to an altitude of about 4,200 m (13,800 ft).

== Ecology ==
In South Georgia, Acaena magellanica may cover the ground in dense patches. It is deciduous, and when the leaves are shed, mosses like Tortula robusta, which grows underneath, flourish.

The Kerguelen Islands are in the Southern Indian Ocean Islands tundra ecoregion which is characterised by tussock grasses, lichens and liverworts. A. magellanica is one of the few low forbs that grew here, but the introduction of the European rabbit (Oryctolagus cuniculus), which selectively grazes the species it prefers, eliminated many of the native forbs. When the rabbit was eradicated, A. magellanica and other forbs failed to recover because years of herbivory had depleted their seed banks, and introduced species such as annual meadow grass (Poa annua), mouse-ear chickweed (Cerastium fontanum) and dandelion (Taraxacum officinale) out-competed them.
