= Amsterdam Island cattle =

Breed of cattle

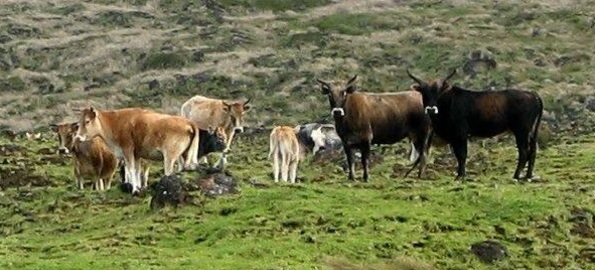
Amsterdam Island Cattle shortly before eradication in 2010

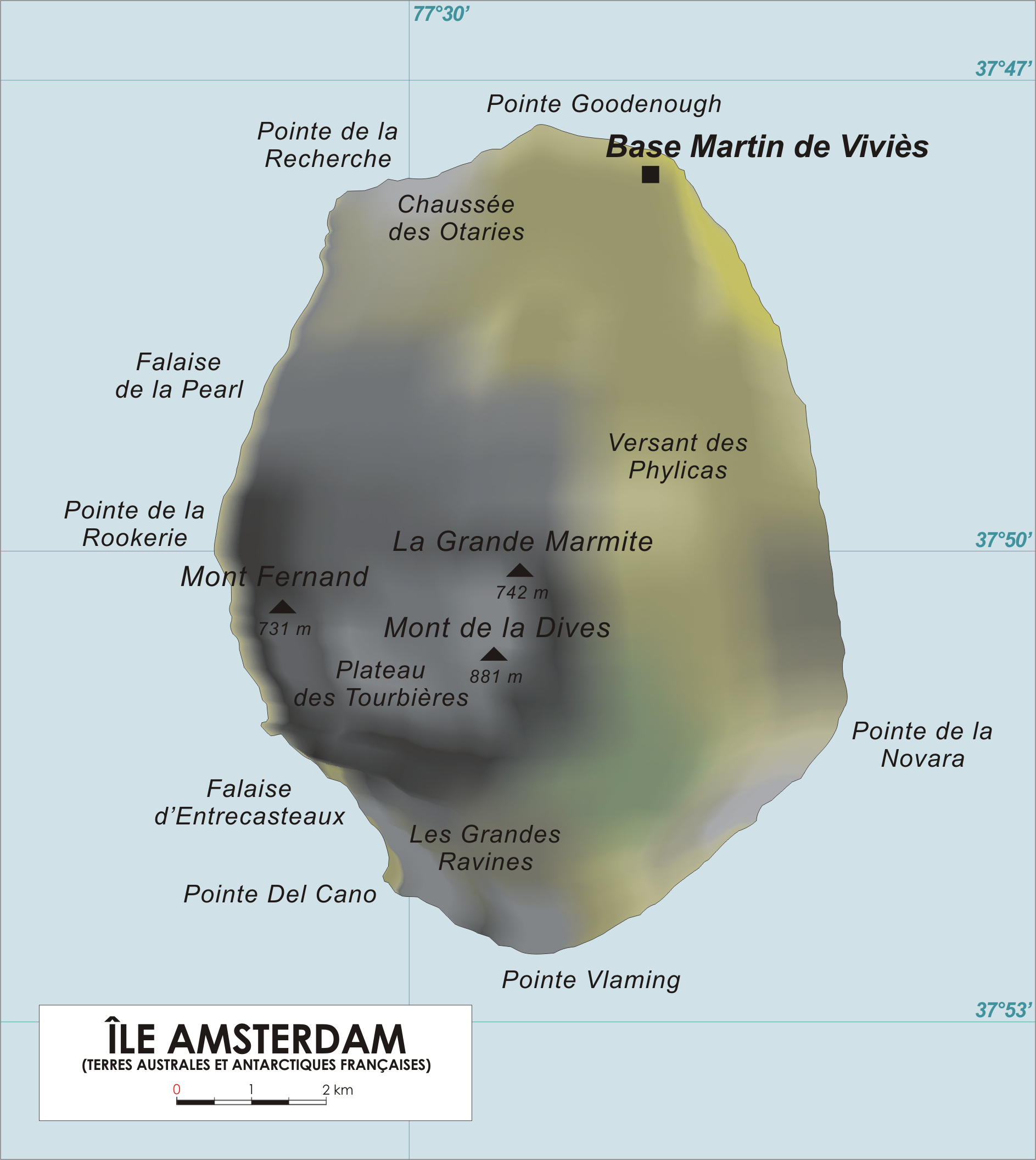
Amsterdam Island

Amsterdam Island cattle were a rare feral breed of cattle (Bos taurus) that were introduced in 1871 and existed in isolation on Amsterdam Island, a small French territory in the southern Indian Ocean. The population was eradicated in 2010 in the course of an environmental restoration program.

== History ==
A party led by Heurtin, a French farmer (sometimes described as a peasant) from Réunion island, on 18 January 1871 attempted to settle the uninhabited 55 km^{2} island. After seven months, their attempts to raise sheep and cattle and grow crops were still unfruitful and they departed on 19 August, abandoning their livestock, including five cattle, on the island.

Over the next century or so a combination of factors caused further ecological devastation of the island, already affected by the introduction of invasive species of plants and animals, as well as by unrestricted hunting, timber-cutting and wildfire caused by sealers and other visitors. The Amsterdam duck and several species of petrel became extinct, and the breeding population of the endemic Amsterdam Island albatross, previously thought to be a subspecies of the wandering albatross, was reduced to just five pairs.

Once the native Phylica arborea (syn. Phylica nitida) forest was almost entirely destroyed, grazing by the increasing numbers of cattle prevented natural regeneration. The original five cattle grew to about 2000, which occupied an area of 3000 ha, at a density of 0.64 individuals per hectare. They degraded the breeding sites of Amsterdam Island albatrosses. The only part of the island the cattle did not occupy was the Plateau des Tourbières, over 550 m above sea level.

Although the cattle posed a threat to the island's environment, they formed one of the very few herds of feral Bos taurus anywhere in the world. In 1987 a fence was built across the island in order to mitigate the damage the cattle impose on the flora and fauna of Amsterdam, as well as to preserve the breed because of scientific interest in its isolation-derived genetic character. During 1988 and 1989, the 1059 cattle south of the fence are culled. Subsequently, the cattle were restricted to the northern part of Amsterdam. About 50-80 mainly adult and subadult males out of a herd of about 350 individuals were shot each year to provide fresh meat for the inhabitants of the Martin-de-Viviès research station, the only settlement on the island.

The population of Amsterdam Island albatrosses increased from 5 breeding pairs in 1983 to 26 in 2007. In 2007, after a study showed that the areas that were not grazed were recolonized by native plants, it was decided to kill all of the remaining cattle on the island. An association of people who had previously wintered on the island tried to oppose the decision, but in vain. The slaughter began in 2008 and ended in 2010. In 2018, the Amsterdam Island albatrosses recovered further and reached the number of 51 breeding pairs.

== Description ==
Sea captain Charles C. Dixon described an encounter with the cattle c. 1900:

We didn't have to hunt for the cattle. They remained on the slope, looking at us with surprise and resentment. They were horned, and brown in colour, and some of them had decided humps. I suppose they were a cross between a British breed and Indian cattle. We could see several herds of them beyond the one we faced, and I think there must have been a thousand or more of them.

— A Million Miles in Sail, p. 178

The cattle were descended from French stock present on Réunion at the time of their introduction, including Jersey, Tarentaise, Grey Alpine, and Breton Black Pied breeds. They were generally small-bodied, with medium-length horns, and exhibited a variety of colour patterns, including one that was reminiscent of the aurochs. Adult male cattle had an average weight of about 390 kg, while adult females weighed about 290 kg.

== Citations and references ==
=== References ===
- Berteaux, D.; Micol, T. (1992). "Population studies and reproduction of the feral cattle (Bos taurus) of Amsterdam Island, Indian Ocean" (PDF). Journal of Zoology. 228 (2): 265–276. doi:10.1111/j.1469-7998.1992.tb04607.x. Archived from the original (PDF) on 2011-08-13.
- Carroll, Paul (2003-06-29). "Amsterdam/St Paul: Discovery and early history". The South Atlantic and Subantarctic Islands. Archived from the original on 14 May 2011.
- Lautier, Sophie (2012-09-19). "Sur l'île Amsterdam, chlorophylle et miaulements". Les coulisses de l'info (in French). AFP. Archived from the original on 2015-03-22.
- McCulloch, John Herries (1933). A Million Miles in Sail: Being the story of the sea career of Captain C. C. Dixon. London: Hurst & Blackett.
- Micol, Thierry; Jouventin, Pierre (1995). "Restoration of Amsterdam Island, South Indian Ocean, following control of feral cattle". Biological Conservation. 73 (3): 199–206. Bibcode:1995BCons..73..199M. doi:10.1016/0006-3207(94)00109-4.
