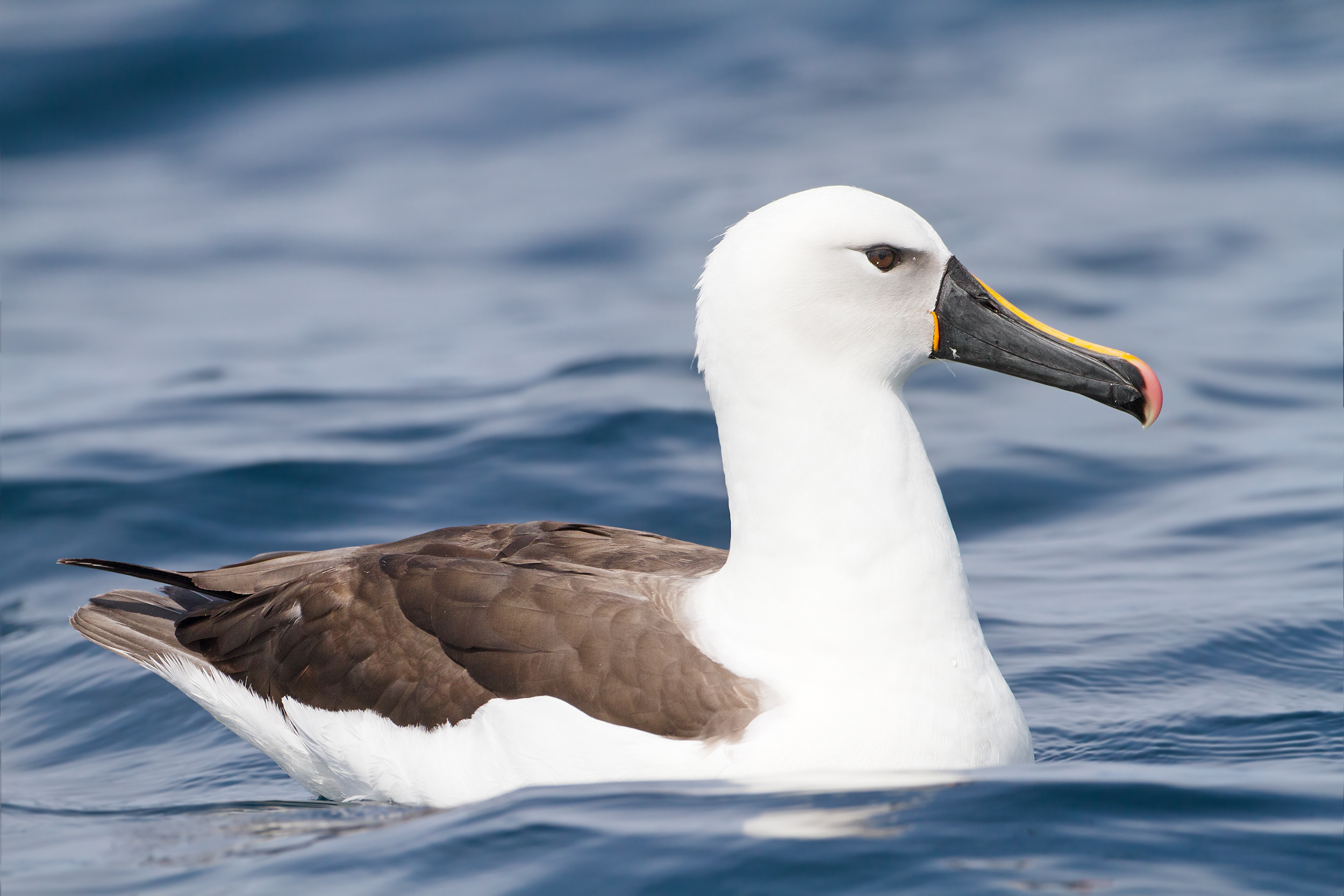
- Off the south-east coast of Tasmania

Conservation status
- Endangered (IUCN 3.1)

Scientific classification
- Kingdom: Animalia
- Phylum: Chordata
- Class: Aves
- Order: Procellariiformes
- Family: Diomedeidae
- Genus: Thalassarche
- Species: T. carteri

Binomial name
- Thalassarche carteri (Rothschild, 1903)

Synonyms
- Thalassarche chlororhynchos carteri Thalassarche bassi

= Indian yellow-nosed albatross =

Species of bird

The Indian yellow-nosed albatross (Thalassarche carteri) is a member of the albatross family, and is the smallest of the mollymawks. In 2004, BirdLife International split this species from the Atlantic yellow-nosed albatross; however Clements has not split it yet, and the SACC has not either, but recognises the need for a proposal.

== Taxonomy ==
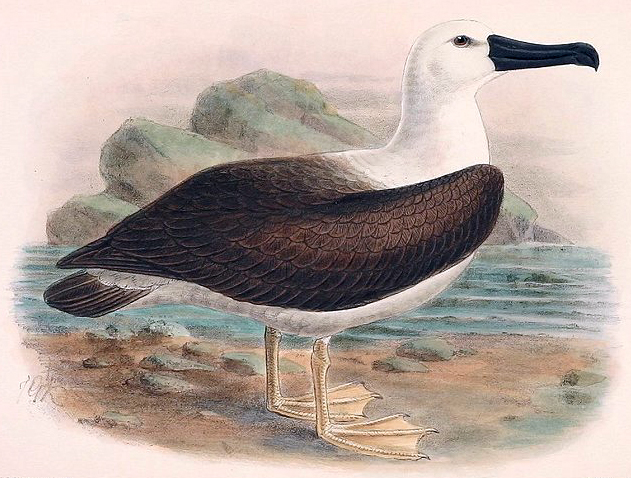
Illustration by Keulemans

Mollymawks are a type of albatross that belong to the family Diomedeidae of the order Procellariiformes, along with shearwaters, fulmars, storm petrels, and diving petrels. They share certain identifying features. They have nasal passages called naricorns attached to the upper bill. The bills of Procellariiformes are unique in that they are split into between seven and nine horny plates. They make a stomach oil made of wax esters and triglycerides that is stored in the proventriculus. This is used against predators and as an energy rich food source for chicks and for the adults during their long flights. They have a salt gland above the nasal passage. It helps desalinate their bodies, due to the high amount of ocean water that they imbibe. The type-specimen is a black-beaked juvenile, which has caused confusion over its status until recently.

== Description ==
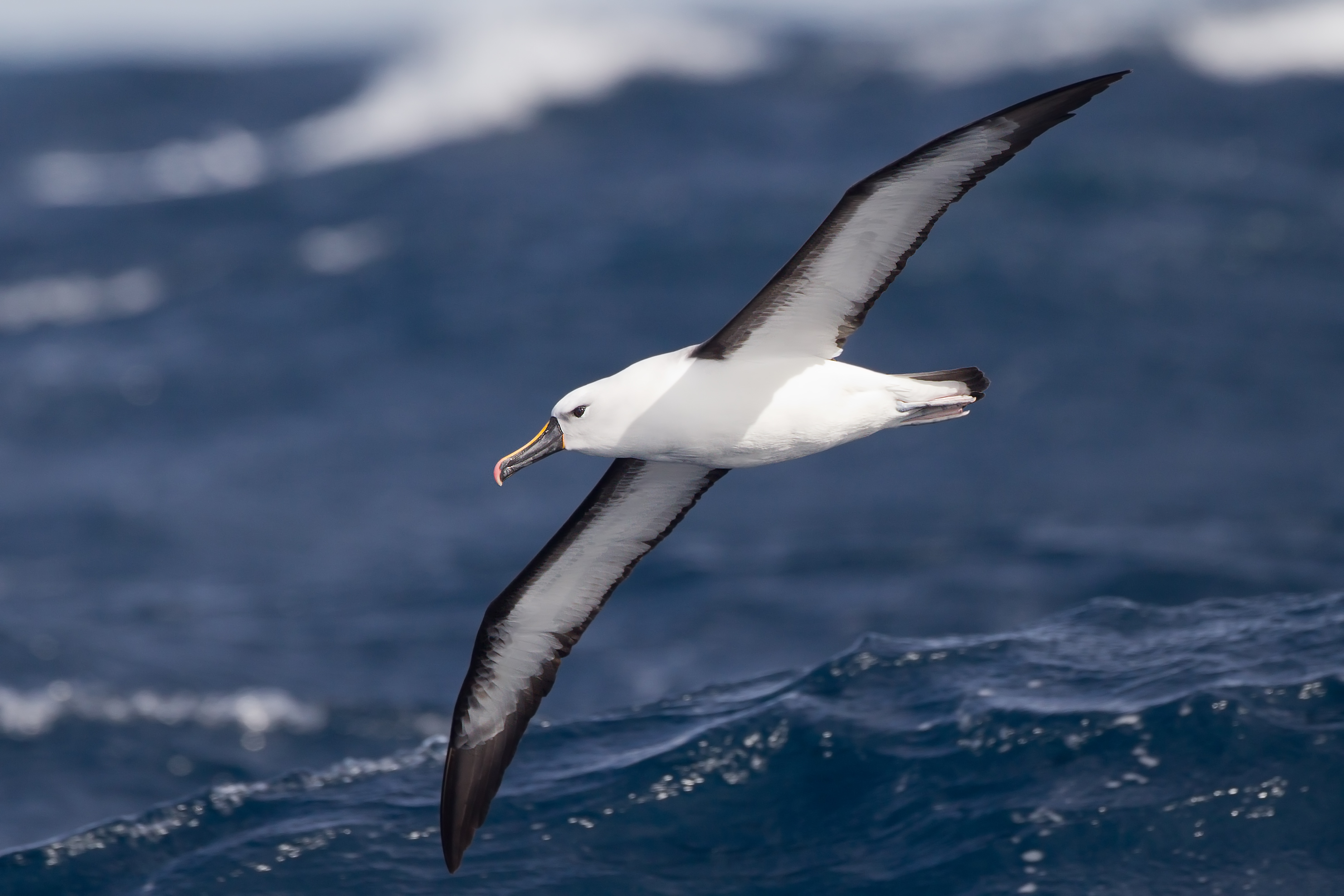
East of Port Stephens

The Indian yellow-nosed albatross weighs 2.55 kg (5.6 lb), is 76 cm (30 in) long and is 2 m (6.6 ft) across the wings. The adult has a pale grey or white head and nape, with a dark grey mantle, upperwing, and tail. Its rump and underparts are white, and its underwing is white with a black tip with a narrow black margin at the leading edge. Its bill is black with a yellow upper ridge and a red tip. The juvenile has a white head and all black bill. It is difficult to distinguish from the closely related grey-headed albatross and Atlantic yellow-nosed albatross, the latter with which it was long considered conspecific and is still considered by some a subspecies of. It can be distinguished from the Atlantic yellow-nosed by its head, the grey plumage of which is lighter on the Indian yellow-nosed.

== Behaviour ==
=== Reproduction ===
Like all albatrosses, the Indian yellow-nosed albatross is a colonial breeder. It breeds annually, and the adults begin breeding at the age of eight years. A mud nest is built in bare rocky areas or in tussock grass or ferns, and a single egg is laid. The nesting season begins in August, with laying occurring around September/October. Incubation lasts around 70 days. After hatching the chick takes around 115 days to fledge.

=== Feeding ===
It feeds on fish, crustaceans and cephalopods.

== Range and habitat ==
Breeding Population and Trends
Location	Population	Date	Trend
Amsterdam Island	27,000 pair	1997	Declining
Prince Edward Islands	7,500 pair	2002	Stable
Crozet Island	7,030 pair	2007	
Kerguelen Island	50 pair	1998	
Île Saint-Paul	3 pair	2007	
Total	65,000	2004	Declining

It breeds on Prince Edward Islands, the Crozet Islands, Kerguelen Island, Amsterdam Island (on the Falaises d'Entrecasteaux) and St Paul Islands in the Indian Ocean. When feeding during incubation, birds will forage up to 1,500 km (930 mi) from the colony. At sea it ranges from South Africa to the Pacific Ocean just beyond New Zealand, ranging from 30° S to 50° S.

== Conservation ==
It is considered to be an endangered species by the IUCN, due to dramatic declines in the last seventy years, caused by interactions with longline fisheries and the outbreak of introduced diseases, such as avian cholera and Erysipelothrix rhusiopathiae. It has an occurrence range of 35,300,000 km^{2} (13,600,000 sq mi) and a breeding range of 1,400 km^{2} (540 sq mi). A 2004 population estimate established that around a total of 65,000 adult birds are alive. This is based on earlier counts as follows: 27,000 breeding pairs breed on Amsterdam Island, and 7,500 pair on Prince Edward Island, 7,030 on Crozet Island, 50 on Kerguelen Island, and 3 pair on St. Paul Island for a total of 41,580 pair or 83,000 mature individuals. Take into account decreasing trends for the stated number.

Monitoring of the birds and studying of its foraging is an ongoing project on Amsterdam Island, and Prince Edward Islands is a nature preserve. A vaccination has been developed but remains untested. Finally, in 2006, the Indian Ocean Tuna Commission adopted a measure to require longline boats to use a bird streamer south of 30°S, and South Africa requires its boats to use a variety of mitigation processes.
