= Mount Velain =

Mountain in Graham Land, Antarctica

Mount Velain (66°42′S 67°44′W) is a 750 m-tall (2,460 ft) mountain with an isolated, black triangular summit showing through its snow mantle, standing in the northeast part of Adelaide Island. It was first charted by the French Antarctic Expedition 1903–05, under Charcot, and named by him for Charles Velain, a French geologist, geographer, and professor of physical geography at the Sorbonne.
