= List of birds of the Auckland Islands =

This is a list of the bird species recorded on the Auckland Islands . The avifauna of the Auckland Islands include a total of 123 species.

This list's taxonomic treatment (designation and sequence of orders, families and species) and nomenclature (common and scientific names) follow the conventions of The Clements Checklist of Birds of the World, 2022 edition. The family accounts at the beginning of each heading reflect this taxonomy, as do the species counts found in each family account. Introduced and accidental species are included in the total counts for the Auckland Islands .

The following tags have been used to highlight several categories. The commonly occurring native species do not fall into any of these categories.

- (A) Accidental - a species that rarely or accidentally occurs on the Auckland Islands .
- (E) Endemic - a species endemic to the Auckland Islands
- (I) Introduced - a species introduced to the Auckland Islands as a consequence, direct or indirect, of human actions

== Ducks, geese, and waterfowl ==
Order: Anseriformes Family: Anatidae

Anatidae includes the ducks and most duck-like waterfowl, such as geese and swans. These birds are adapted to an aquatic existence with webbed feet, flattened bills, and feathers that are excellent at shedding water due to an oily coating.

- Canada goose, Branta canadensis (A)
- Black swan, Cygnus atratus (A)
- Australian shelduck, Tadorna tadornoides (A)
- Australian shoveler, Spatula rhynchotis (A)
- Pacific black duck, Anas superciliosa
- Mallard, Anas platyrhynchos (I)
- Gray teal, Anas gracilis
- Auckland Islands teal, Anas aucklandica (E)
- Hardhead, Aythya australis (A)
- Auckland Islands merganser, Mergus australis extinct

== Cuckoos ==
Order: Cuculiformes Family: Cuculidae

The family Cuculidae includes cuckoos, roadrunners and anis. These birds are of variable size with slender bodies, long tails and strong legs.

- Long-tailed koel, Urodynamis taitensis (A)
- Shining bronze-cuckoo, Chrysococcyx lucidus (A)

== Swifts ==
Order: Caprimulgiformes Family: Apodidae

Swifts are small birds which spend the majority of their lives flying. These birds have very short legs and never settle voluntarily on the ground, perching instead only on vertical surfaces. Many swifts have long swept-back wings which resemble a crescent or boomerang.

- White-throated needletail, Hirundapus caudacutus (A)

== Rails, gallinules, and coots ==
Order: Gruiformes Family: Rallidae

Rallidae is a large family of small to medium-sized birds which includes the rails, crakes, coots and gallinules. Typically they inhabit dense vegetation in damp environments near lakes, swamps or rivers. In general they are shy and secretive birds, making them difficult to observe. Most species have strong legs and long toes which are well adapted to soft uneven surfaces. They tend to have short, rounded wings and to be weak fliers.

- Auckland Islands rail, Lewinia muelleri (E)
- Buff-banded rail, Gallirallus philippensis

== Plovers and lapwings ==
Order: Charadriiformes Family: Charadriidae

The family Charadriidae includes the plovers, dotterels and lapwings. They are small to medium-sized birds with compact bodies, short, thick necks and long, usually pointed, wings. They are found in open country worldwide, mostly in habitats near water.

- Pacific golden-plover, Pluvialis fulva (A)
- Masked lapwing, Vanellus miles (A)
- Double-banded plover, Charadrius bicinctus

== Sandpipers and allies ==
Order: Charadriiformes Family: Scolopacidae

Scolopacidae is a large diverse family of small to medium-sized shorebirds including the sandpipers, curlews, godwits, shanks, tattlers, woodcocks, snipes, dowitchers and phalaropes. The majority of these species eat small invertebrates picked out of the mud or soil. Variation in length of legs and bills enables multiple species to feed in the same habitat, particularly on the coast, without direct competition for food.

- Bar-tailed godwit, Limosa lapponica (A)
- Black-tailed godwit, Limosa limosa (A)
- Ruddy turnstone, Arenaria interpres
- Red knot, Calidris canutus (A)
- Sharp-tailed sandpiper, Calidris acuminata (A)
- Curlew sandpiper, Calidris ferruginea (A)
- Red-necked stint, Tringa incana (A)
- Subantarctic snipe, Coenocorypha aucklandica (A)
- Gray-tailed tattler, Tringa brevipes (A)
- Wandering tattler, Tringa incana (A) (A)
- Common greenshank, Tringa nebularia

== Skuas and jaegers ==
Order: Charadriiformes Family: Stercorariidae

The family Stercorariidae are, in general, medium to large birds, typically with grey or brown plumage, often with white markings on the wings. They nest on the ground in temperate and arctic regions and are long-distance migrants.

- South polar skua, Stercorarius maccormicki (A)
- Brown skua, Stercorarius antarcticus
- Parasitic jaeger, Stercorarius parasiticus

== Gulls, terns, and skimmers ==
Order: Charadriiformes Family: Laridae

Laridae is a family of medium to large seabirds, the gulls, terns, and skimmers. Gulls are typically grey or white, often with black markings on the head or wings. They have stout, longish bills and webbed feet. Terns are a group of generally medium to large seabirds typically with grey or white plumage, often with black markings on the head. Most terns hunt fish by diving but some pick insects off the surface of fresh water. Terns are generally long-lived birds, with several species known to live in excess of 30 years.

- Black-billed gull, Chroicocephalus bulleri (A)
- Silver gull, Chroicocephalus novaehollandiae
- Kelp gull, Larus dominicanus
- White-fronted tern, Sterna striata
- Arctic tern, Sterna paradisaea (A)
- Antarctic tern, Sterna vittata

== Penguins ==
Order: Sphenisciformes Family: Spheniscidae

Penguins are a group of aquatic, flightless birds living almost exclusively in the Southern Hemisphere, especially in Antarctica. Only one species, the little penguin, breeds on the Australian coast.

- King penguin, Aptenodytes patagonicus (A)
- Yellow-eyed penguin, Megadyptes antipodes
- Fiordland penguin, Eudyptes pachyrhynchus (A)
- Erect-crested penguin, Eudyptes sclateri
- Macaroni penguin, Eudyptes chrysolophus
- Royal penguin, Eudyptes schlegeli (A)
- Southern rockhopper penguin, Eudyptes chrysocome
- Snares penguin, Eudyptes robustus (A)

== Albatrosses ==
Order: Procellariiformes Family: Diomedeidae

The albatrosses are among the largest of flying birds, and the great albatrosses from the genus Diomedea have the largest wingspans of any extant birds.

- Gray-headed albatross, Thalassarche chrysostoma
- Buller's albatross, Thalassarche bulleri
- White-capped albatross, Thalassarche cauta
- Salvin's albatross, Thalassarche salvini
- Black-browed albatross, Thalassarche melanophris
- Sooty albatross, Phoebetria fusca (A)
- Light-mantled albatross, Phoebetria palpebrata
- Royal albatross, Diomedea epomophora
- Wandering albatross, Diomedea exulans

== Southern storm-petrels ==
Order: Procellariiformes Family: Oceanitidae

The southern storm-petrels are relatives of the petrels and are the smallest seabirds. They feed on planktonic crustaceans and small fish picked from the surface, typically while hovering. The flight is fluttering and sometimes bat-like.

- Wilson's storm-petrel, Oceanites oceanicus (A)
- Gray-backed storm-petrel, Garrodia nereis
- White-faced storm-petrel, Pelagodroma marina
- Black-bellied storm-petrel, Fregetta tropica

== Shearwaters and petrels ==
Order: Procellariiformes Family: Procellariidae

The procellariids are the main group of medium-sized "true petrels", characterised by united nostrils with medium septum and a long outer functional primary.

- Southern giant-petrel, Macronectes giganteus (A)
- Northern giant-petrel, Macronectes halli
- Cape petrel, Daption capense
- Southern fulmar, Fulmarus glacialoides
- Antarctic petrel, Thalassoica antarctica (A)
- Kerguelen petrel, Aphrodroma brevirostris
- Gray-faced petrel, Pterodroma gouldi
- Magenta petrel, Pterodroma magentae
- Soft-plumaged petrel, Pterodroma mollis
- White-headed petrel, Pterodroma lessonii
- Mottled petrel, Pterodroma inexpectata (A)
- Cook's petrel, Pterodroma cookii
- Blue petrel, Halobaena caerulea (A)
- Fairy prion, Pachyptila turtur
- Broad-billed prion, Pachyptila vittata
- Salvin's prion, Pachyptila salvini
- Antarctic prion, Pachyptila desolata
- Slender-billed prion, Pachyptila belcheri
- Fulmar prion, Pachyptila crassirostris
- Gray petrel, Procellaria cinerea
- White-chinned petrel, Procellaria aequinoctialis
- Flesh-footed shearwater, Ardenna carneipes
- Buller's shearwater, Ardenna bulleri
- Sooty shearwater, Ardenna grisea
- Short-tailed shearwater, Ardenna tenuirostris
- Fluttering shearwater, Puffinus gavia
- Subantarctic shearwater, Puffinus elegans
- Common diving-petrel, Pelecanoides urinatrix
- South Georgia diving-petrel, Pelecanoides georgicus

== Boobies and gannets ==
Order: Suliformes Family: Sulidae

The sulids comprise the gannets and boobies. Both groups are medium-large coastal seabirds that plunge-dive for fish.

- Australasian gannet, Morus serrator (A)

== Cormorants and shags ==
Order: Suliformes Family: Phalacrocoracidae

Phalacrocoracidae is a family of medium to large coastal, fish-eating seabirds that includes cormorants and shags. Plumage colouration varies, with the majority having mainly dark plumage, some species being black-and-white and a few being colourful.

- Little pied cormorant, Microcarbo melanoleucos (A)
- Great cormorant, Phalacrocorax carbo (A)
- Auckland Islands shag, Leucocarbo colensoi (E)
- Campbell Islands shag, Leucocarbo campbelli (A)
- Macquarie shag, Leucocarbo purpurascens (A)

== Herons, egrets, and bitterns ==
Order: Pelecaniformes Family: Ardeidae

The family Ardeidae contains the bitterns, herons and egrets. Herons and egrets are medium to large wading birds with long necks and legs. Bitterns tend to be shorter necked and more wary. Members of Ardeidae fly with their necks retracted, unlike other long-necked birds such as storks, ibises and spoonbills.

- Great egret, Ardea alba
- White-faced heron, Egretta novaehollandiae (A)
- Little egret, Egretta garzetta
- Pacific reef-heron, Egretta sacra (A)
- Cattle egret, Bubulcus ibis

== Hawks, eagles, and kites ==
Order: Accipitriformes Family: Accipitridae

Accipitridae is a family of birds of prey, which includes hawks, eagles, kites, harriers and Old World vultures. These birds have powerful hooked beaks for tearing flesh from their prey, strong legs, powerful talons and keen eyesight.

- Swamp harrier, Circus approximans

== Owls ==
Order: Strigiformes Family: Strigidae

The typical owls are small to large solitary nocturnal birds of prey. They have large forward-facing eyes and ears, a hawk-like beak and a conspicuous circle of feathers around each eye called a facial disk.

- Morepork, Ninox novaeseelandiae

== Falcons and caracaras ==
Order: Falconiformes Family: Falconidae

Falconidae is a family of diurnal birds of prey. They differ from hawks, eagles, and kites in that they kill with their beaks instead of their talons.

- New Zealand falcon, Falco novaeseelandiae

== Old World parrots ==
Order: Psittaciformes Family: Psittaculidae

Characteristic features of parrots include a strong curved bill, an upright stance, strong legs, and clawed zygodactyl feet. Many parrots are vividly colored, and some are multi-colored. In size they range from 8 cm (3.1 in) to 1 m (3.3 ft) in length. Old World parrots are found from Africa east across south and southeast Asia and Oceania to Australia and New Zealand.

- Red-crowned parakeet, Cyanoramphus novaezelandiae
- Yellow-crowned parakeet, Cyanoramphus auriceps

== Honeyeaters ==
Order: Passeriformes Family: Meliphagidae

The honeyeaters are a large and diverse family of small to medium-sized birds most common in Australia and New Guinea. They are nectar feeders and closely resemble other nectar-feeding passerines.

- Tui, Prosthemadera novaeseelandiae
- New Zealand bellbird, Anthornis melanura

== Thornbills and allies ==
Order: Passeriformes Family: Acanthizidae

Thornbills are small passerine birds, similar in habits to the tits.

- Grey warbler, Gerygone igata

== Australasian robins ==
Order: Passeriformes Family: Petroicidae

Most species of Petroicidae have a stocky build with a large rounded head, a short straight bill and rounded wingtips. They occupy a wide range of wooded habitats, from subalpine to tropical rainforest, and mangrove swamp to semi-arid scrubland. All are primarily insectivores, although a few supplement their diet with seeds.

- Tomtit, Petroica macrocephala

== Larks ==
Order: Passeriformes Family: Alaudidae

Larks are small terrestrial birds with often extravagant songs and display flights. Most larks are fairly dull in appearance. Their food is insects and seeds.

- Eurasian skylark, Alauda arvensis (A)

== Swallows ==
Order: Passeriformes Family: Hirundinidae

The family Hirundinidae is adapted to aerial feeding. They have a slender streamlined body, long pointed wings, and a short bill with a wide gape. The feet are adapted to perching rather than walking, and the front toes are partially joined at the base.

- Welcome swallow, Hirundo neoxena (A)

== White-eyes, yuhinas, and allies ==
Order: Passeriformes Family: Zosteropidae

The white-eyes are small birds of rather drab appearance, the plumage above being typically greenish-olive, but some species have a white or bright yellow throat, breast, or lower parts, and several have buff flanks. As the name suggests, many species have a white ring around each eye.

- Silver-eye, Zosterops lateralis

== Starlings ==
Order: Passeriformes Family: Sturnidae

Starlings are small to medium-sized passerine birds. Their flight is strong and direct and they are very gregarious. Their preferred habitat is fairly open country. They eat insects and fruit. Plumage is typically dark with a metallic sheen.

- European starling, Sturnus vulgaris (I)

== Thrushes and allies ==
Order: Passeriformes Family: Turdidae

The thrushes are a group of passerine birds that occur mainly in the Old World. They are plump, soft plumaged, small to medium-sized insectivores or sometimes omnivores, often feeding on the ground. Many have attractive songs.

- Song thrush, Turdus philomelos (I)
- Eurasian blackbird, Turdus merula (I)

== Accentors ==
Order: Passeriformes Family: Prunellidae

The accentors are in the only bird family, Prunellidae, which is completely endemic to the Palearctic. They are small, fairly drab species superficially similar to sparrows.

- Dunnock, Prunella modularis (I)

== Old World sparrows ==
Order: Passeriformes Family: Passeridae

Old World sparrows are small passerine birds, typically small, plump, brown or grey with short tails and short powerful beaks. They are seed-eaters, but also consume small insects.

- House sparrow, Passer domesticus (A)

== Wagtails and pipits ==
Order: Passeriformes Family: Motacillidae

Motacillidae is a family of small passerine birds with medium to long tails and comprises the wagtails, longclaws, and pipits. These are slender ground-feeding insectivores of open country.

- New Zealand pipit, Anthus novaeseelandiae

== Finches, euphonias, and allies ==
Order: Passeriformes Family: Fringillidae

Finches are small to moderately large seed-eating passerine birds with a strong beak, usually conical and in some species very large. All have 12 tail feathers and nine primary flight feathers. Finches have a bouncing flight, alternating bouts of flapping with gliding on closed wings, and most sing well.

- Common chaffinch, Fringilla coelebs (I)
- European greenfinch, Chloris chloris (I)
- Common redpoll, Acanthis flammea (I)
- Lesser redpoll, Acanthis cabaret (I)
- European goldfinch, Carduelis carduelis (A)

== Old World buntings ==
Order: Passeriformes Family: Emberizidae

Emberizidae is a family of passerine birds containing a single genus. Until 2017, the New World sparrows (Passerellidae) were also considered part of this family.

- Yellowhammer, Emberiza citrinella (A)

== See also ==
- List of birds
- Lists of birds by region
