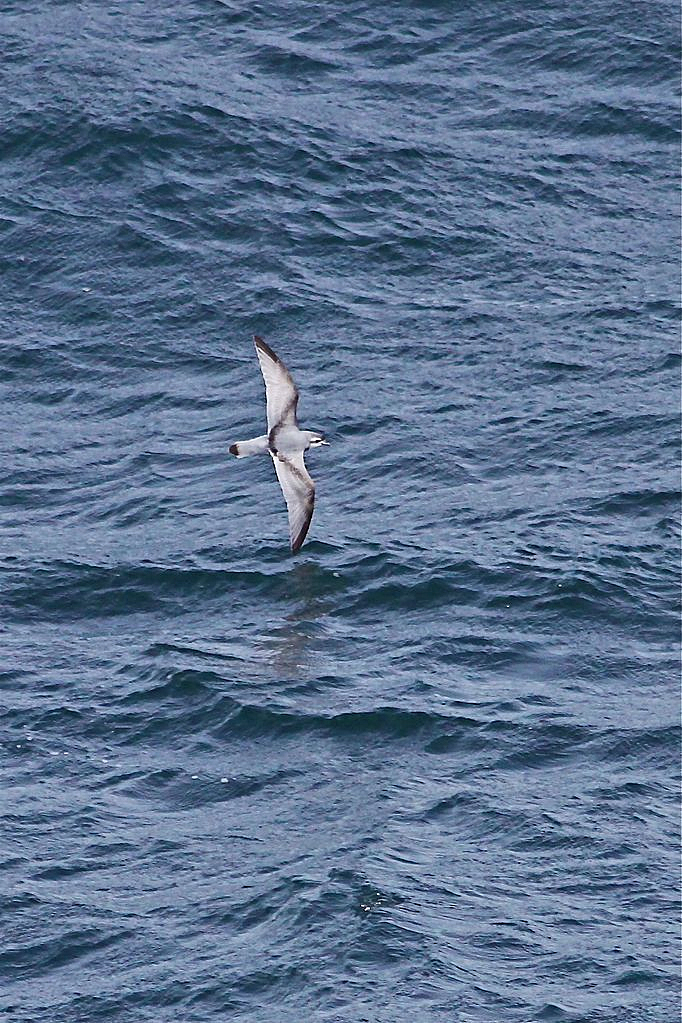
- Slender-billed prion

Scientific classification
- Kingdom: Animalia
- Phylum: Chordata
- Class: Aves
- Order: Procellariiformes
- Family: Procellariidae
- Genus: Pachyptila; Illiger, 1811

Type species
- Procellaria forsteri = Procellaria vittata Forster, G, 1777

= Pachyptila =

Genus of birds

Pachyptila is a genus of seabirds in the family Procellariidae and the order Procellariiformes. The members of this genus and the blue petrel form a sub-group called prions. They range throughout the southern hemisphere, often in the much cooler higher latitudes. Three species, the broad-billed prion (Pachyptila vittata), the Antarctic prion (Pachyptila desolata) and the fairy prion (Pachyptila turtur), range into the subtropics.

== Taxonomy ==
The genus Pachyptila was introduced in 1811 by the German zoologist Johann Karl Wilhelm Illiger. The name combines the Ancient Greek pakhus meaning "dense" or "thick" with ptilon meaning "feather" or "plumage". The type species was subsequently designated as the broad-billed prion by English naturalist Prideaux John Selby in 1840. The English name "prion" comes from the Ancient Greek πριόνι (prióni, "saw"), in reference to the serrated edges of its bill.

All the members of this genus, along with the rest of the Procellariiformes, share certain identifying features. First, they have nasal passages that attach to the upper bill called naricorns, although the nostrils on the albatross are on the sides of the bill. The bills of Procellariiformes are also unique in that they are split into between seven and nine horny plates. The genus produces a stomach oil made up of wax esters and triglycerides that is stored in the proventriculus. This can be sprayed out of their mouths as a defence against predators and as an energy-rich food source for chicks and for the adults during their long flights. Finally, they also have a salt gland that is situated above the nasal passage and helps free their bodies of the salt in the seawater they often imbibe. The gland excretes a concentrated saline solution from the nose.

== Description ==
Prions are pelagic and seldom come to land, except to breed. They appear to remain in the Southern Hemisphere, and breed on subantarctic islands except the fairy prion which breeds on subtropical islands.

The members of this genus primarily eat zooplankton by filtering water through their upper bill. Some even hydroplane, a technique where they filter food out the water while flying with their bill in the ocean. They breed colonially, and do so near the ocean, usually with the same mate for life. Both sexes help incubate the egg, and care for the chick.

== Species ==
The genus contains the following seven species.

Image	Scientific name	Common name	Distribution
	Pachyptila turtur	fairy prion	breeds on subtropical and subantarctic islands
	Pachyptila belcheri	slender-billed prion	breeds on Crozet Islands, Kerguelen Islands, Falkland Islands, and Noir Island
	Pachyptila crassirostris	fulmar prion	breeds on Snares Islands, Bounty Island, Chatham Islands, Heard Island and the Auckland Islands
	Pachyptila vittata	broad-billed prion	breeds on islands near New Zealand and the Tristan da Cunha group
	Pachyptila desolata	Antarctic prion	breeds Crozet Islands, Kerguelen Islands, Heard Island, the Scotia Archipelago, South Georgia, South Sandwich Islands, Scott Island Auckland Island and Macquarie Island
	Pachyptila salvini	Salvin's prion	breeds on Prince Edwards Islands, Crozet Islands, Amsterdam Island and St. Paul Island
	Pachyptila macgillivrayi	MacGillivray's prion	Breeds on the Roche Quille, off Saint Paul Island and on Gough Island in the Tristan da Cunha group.

== Sources ==
- Brands, Sheila (14 Aug 2008). "Systema Naturae 2000 / Classification - Genus Pachyptila". Project: The Taxonomicon. Archived from the original on October 1, 2010.
- Clements, James (2007). The Clements Checklist of the Birds of the World (6 ed.). Ithaca, NY: Cornell University Press. ISBN 978-0-8014-4501-9.
- Double, M. C. (2003). "Procellariiformes (Tubenosed Seabirds)". In Hutchins, Michael; Jackson, Jerome A.; Bock, Walter J.; Olendorf, Donna (eds.). Grzimek's Animal Life Encyclopedia. Vol. 8 Birds I Tinamous and Ratites to Hoatzins. Joseph E. Trumpey, Chief Scientific Illustrator (2nd ed.). Farmington Hills, MI: Gale Group. pp. 107–111. ISBN 0-7876-5784-0.
- Ehrlich, Paul R.; Dobkin, David, S.; Wheye, Darryl (1988). The Birders Handbook (First ed.). New York, NY: Simon & Schuster. pp. 29–31. ISBN 0-671-65989-8.
- Maynard, B. J. (2003). "Shearwaters, petrels, and fulmars (Procellariidae)". In Hutchins, Michael; Jackson, Jerome A.; Bock, Walter J.; Olendorf, Donna (eds.). Grzimek's Animal Life Encyclopedia. Vol. 8 Birds I Tinamous and Ratites to Hoatzins. Joseph E. Trumpey, Chief Scientific Illustrator (2nd ed.). Farmington Hills, MI: Gale Group. pp. 123–133. ISBN 0-7876-5784-0.
