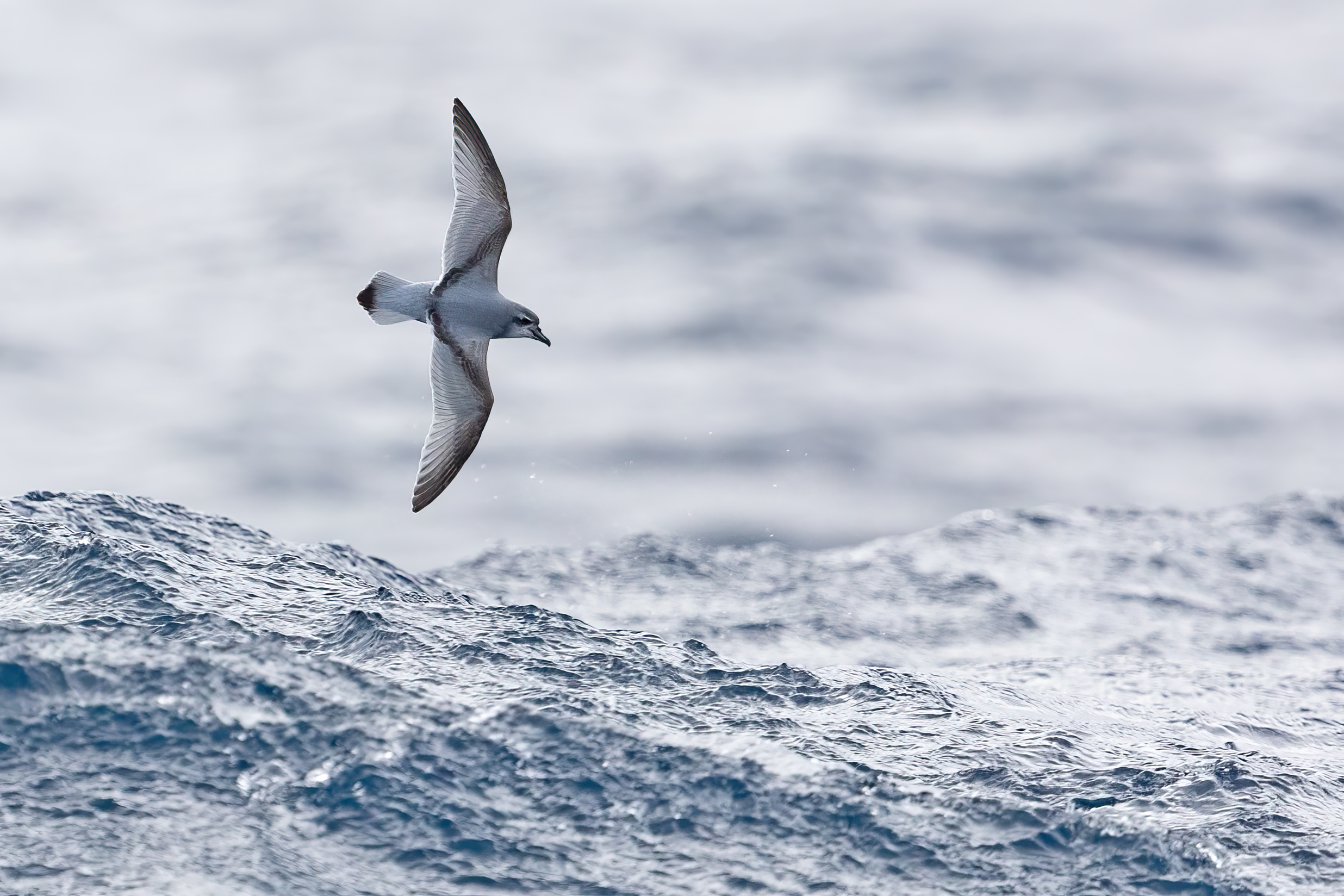

Conservation status
- Least Concern (IUCN 3.1)

Scientific classification
- Kingdom: Animalia
- Phylum: Chordata
- Class: Aves
- Order: Procellariiformes
- Family: Procellariidae
- Genus: Pachyptila
- Species: P. desolata

Binomial name
- Pachyptila desolata (Gmelin, JF, 1789)

Synonyms
- Procellaria desolata (protonym)

= Antarctic prion =

Species of bird

The Antarctic prion (Pachyptila desolata) also known as the dove prion, or totorore in Māori, is the largest of the prions, a genus of small petrels of the Southern Ocean.

== Taxonomy ==
The Antarctic prion was formally described in 1789 by the German naturalist Johann Friedrich Gmelin in his revised and expanded edition of Carl Linnaeus's Systema Naturae. He placed it with the other petrels in the genus Procellaria and coined the binomial name Procellaria desolata. Gmelin based his description on the "brown-banded petrel" that had been described in 1785 by the English ornithologist John Latham from a specimen supplied by the naturalist Joseph Banks that had been collected on the "Isle of Desolation", now the Kerguelen Islands. The Antarctic prion is now one of seven prions placed in the genus Pachyptila that was introduced in 1811 by the German zoologist Johann Karl Wilhelm Illiger. The genus name combines the Ancient Greek pakhus meaning "dense" or "thick" with ptilon meaning "feather" or "plumage". The specific epithet desolata is from Latin desolatus meaning "forsaken" or "desolated". The species is monotypic: no subspecies are recognised.

Prions are members of the family Procellariidae, and the order Procellariiformes. The prions are small and typically eat just zooplankton; however as a member of the Procellariiformes, they share certain identifying features. First, they have nasal passages that attach to the upper bill called naricorns. Although the nostrils on the prion are on top of the upper bill. The bills of Procellariiformes are also unique in that they are split into between seven and nine horny plates. They produce a stomach oil made up of wax esters and triglycerides that is stored in the proventriculus. This can be sprayed out of their mouths as a defence against predators and as an energy rich food source for chicks and for the adults during their long flights. Finally, they also have a salt gland that is situated above the nasal passage and helps desalinate their bodies, due to the high amount of ocean water that they imbibe. It excretes a high saline solution from their nose.

== Description ==
The Antarctic prion has an overall length of 27 cm (11 in), a wingspan of 61–66 cm (24–26 in) and weighs 150–160 g (5.3–5.6 oz). Like all prions, its underparts are white and upperparts are blue-grey, with a dark "M" across its back to its wingtips. It has a white eyebrow, blue-grey bill, and blue feet. It also has a grey wedge-shaped tail with a black tip. On its wings, its greater coverts are near black. It is so similar in appearance to Salvin's prion that the two species cannot be distinguished at sea.

== Distribution and habitat ==
It breeds in colonies on the Auckland Islands, Heard Island, Macquarie Island, Scott Island, South Georgia and the South Sandwich Islands, the South Orkney Islands, South Shetland Islands, Crozet Islands, and the Kerguelen Islands. When not breeding, it ranges throughout the southern oceans.

== Behaviour ==
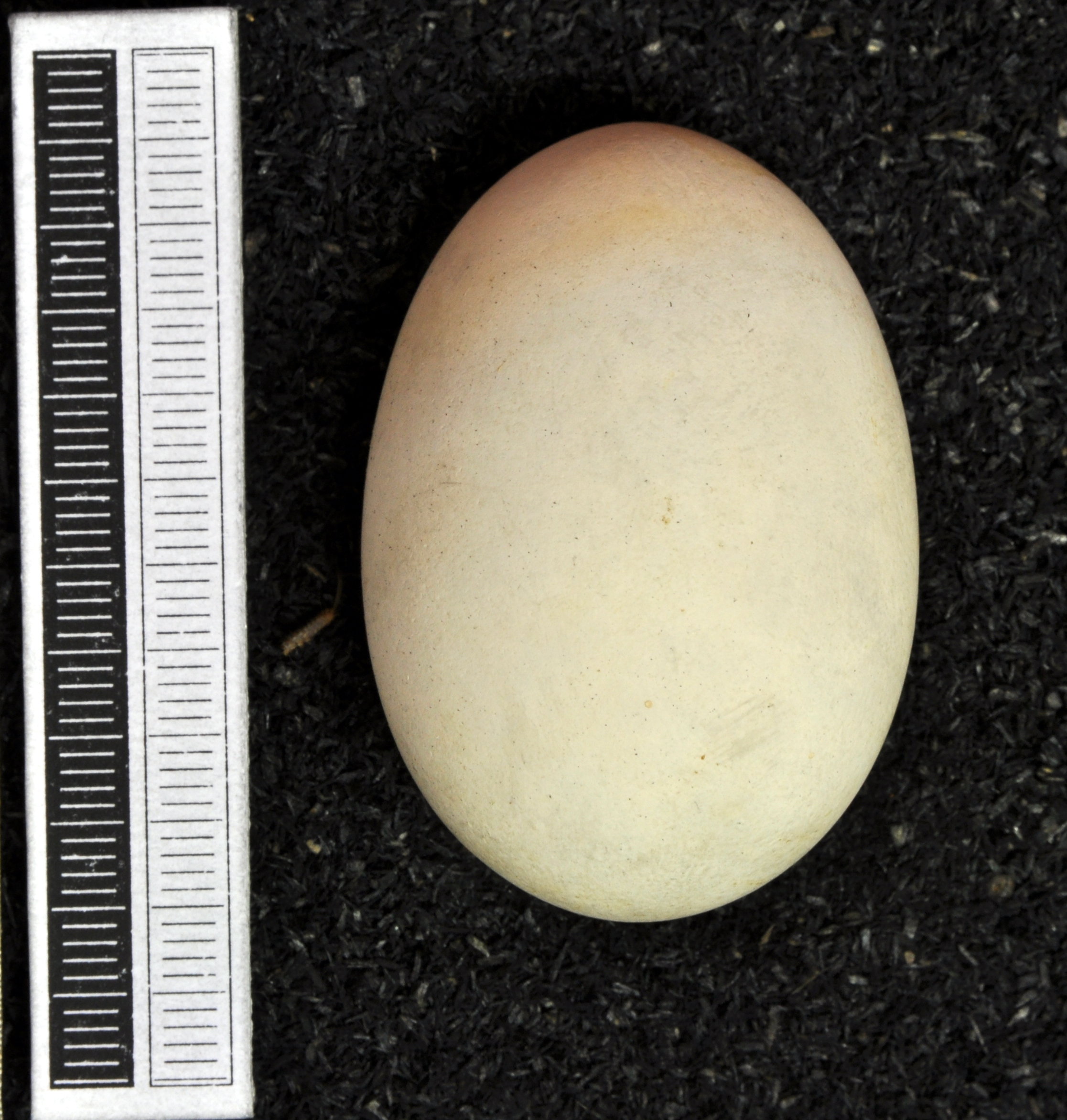
Egg, Collection Museum Wiesbaden

=== Food and feeding ===
Like all prions, the Antarctic prion eats primarily zooplankton, which it obtains by filtering water through its upper bill.

=== Breeding ===
The Antarctic prion nests in colonies, and prefers islands in the Southern Ocean. Both sexes assist in building the nest, as well as incubating the single egg and raising the chick.

== Conservation ==
The Antarctic prion has an occurrence range of 76,600,000 km^{2} (29,600,000 sq mi) and an estimated adult bird population of 50 million.

== Sources ==
- BirdLife International (2009). "Antarctic Prion - BirdLife Species Factsheet". Data Zone.
- Double, M. C. (2003). "Procellariiformes (Tubenosed Seabirds)". In Hutchins, Michael; Jackson, Jerome A.; Bock, Walter J.; Olendorf, Donna (eds.). Grzimek's Animal Life Encyclopedia. Vol. 8, Birds I: Tinamous and Ratites to Hoatzins. Joseph E. Trumpey, Chief Scientific Illustrator (2nd ed.). Farmington Hills, MI: Gale Group. pp. 107–111. ISBN 0-7876-5784-0.
- Ehrlich, Paul R.; Dobkin, David, S.; Wheye, Darryl (1988). The Birders Handbook (First ed.). New York, NY: Simon & Schuster. pp. 29–31. ISBN 0-671-65989-8.
- Maynard, B. J. (2003). "Shearwaters, petrels, and fulmars (Procellariidae)". In Hutchins, Michael; Jackson, Jerome A.; Bock, Walter J.; Olendorf, Donna (eds.). Grzimek's Animal Life Encyclopedia. Vol. 8, Birds I: Tinamous and Ratites to Hoatzins. Joseph E. Trumpey, Chief Scientific Illustrator (2nd ed.). Farmington Hills, MI: Gale Group. pp. 123–133. ISBN 0-7876-5784-0.
