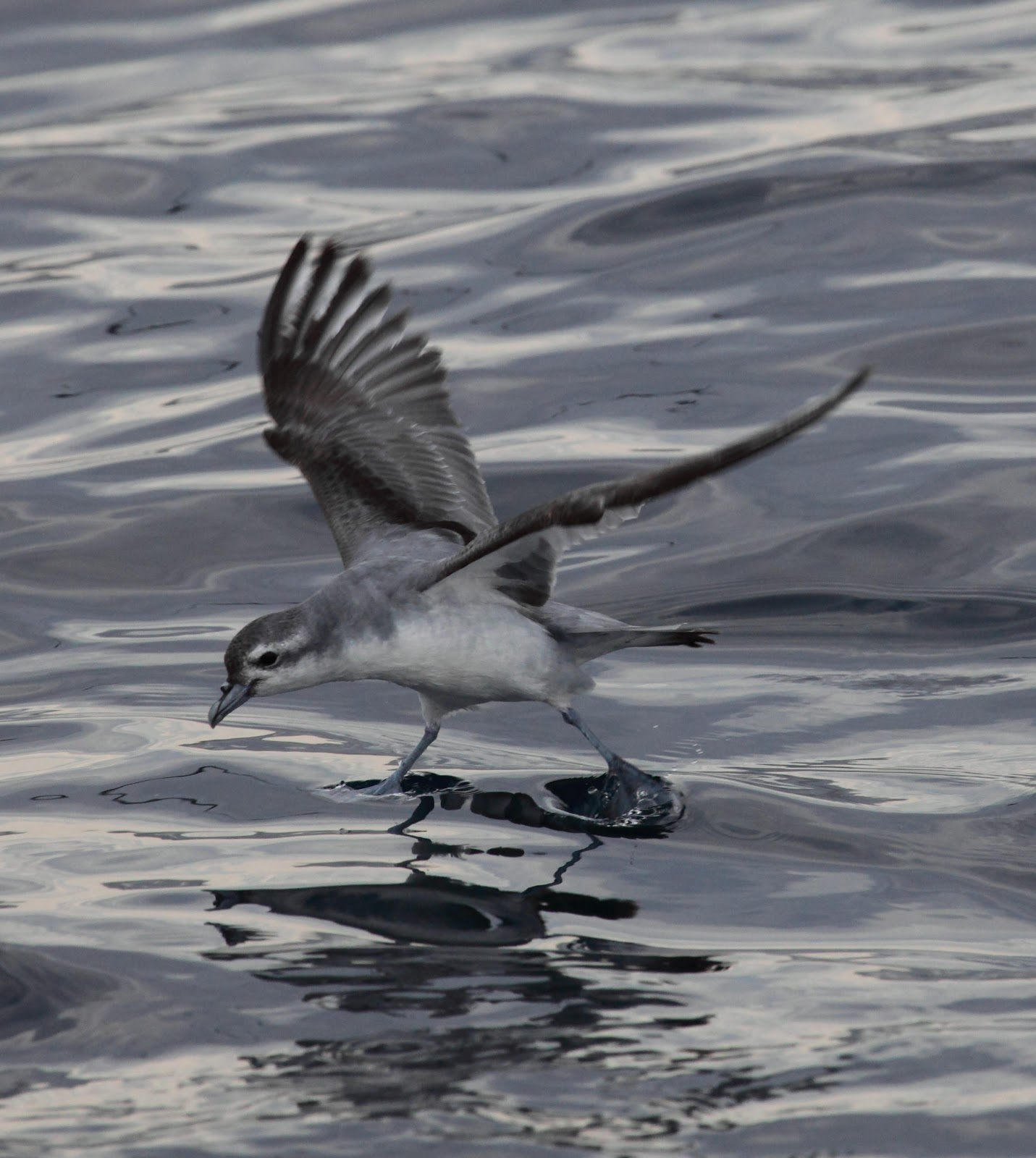
- Fairy prion

Scientific classification
- Kingdom: Animalia
- Phylum: Chordata
- Class: Aves
- Order: Procellariiformes
- Family: Procellariidae
- Tribe: Prion

Genera
- Pachyptila; Halobaena

Diversity
- 2 genera and 7 species

= Prion (bird) =

Prions

Group of birds

The prions (/ˈpraɪɒn/) or whalebirds are small petrels in the genera Pachyptila and Halobaena. They form one of the four groups within the Procellariidae along with the gadfly petrels, shearwaters, and fulmarine petrels. The name derives from the Greek priōn, meaning "saw", a reference of the serrated edges of the birds' saw-like bill.

They are found in the Southern Ocean and breed on a number of subantarctic islands. Prions grow 20 to 27 cm (7.9–10.6 in) long, and have blue-grey upper parts and white underparts. Three species of prion have flattened bills with a fringe of lamellae that act as strainers for zooplankton. All prions are marine and feed on small crustacea such as copepods, ostracods, decapods, and krill, as well as some fish such as myctophids and nototheniids.

== List of species ==
- Pachyptila
  - Pachyptila turtur, fairy prion
  - Pachyptila belcheri, slender-billed prion
  - Pachyptila crassirostris, fulmar prion
  - Pachyptila vittata, broad-billed prion
  - Pachyptila desolata, Antarctic prion
  - Pachyptila salvini, Salvin's prion
  - Pachyptila macgillivrayi, MacGillivray's prion
- Halobaena
  - Halobaena caerulea, blue petrel

In addition, fossil remains of some hitherto undescribed prehistoric species have been found. The oldest comes from the Late Miocene (Tortonian, some 7 to 12 million years ago) of the Bahía Inglesa Formation in Chile.
