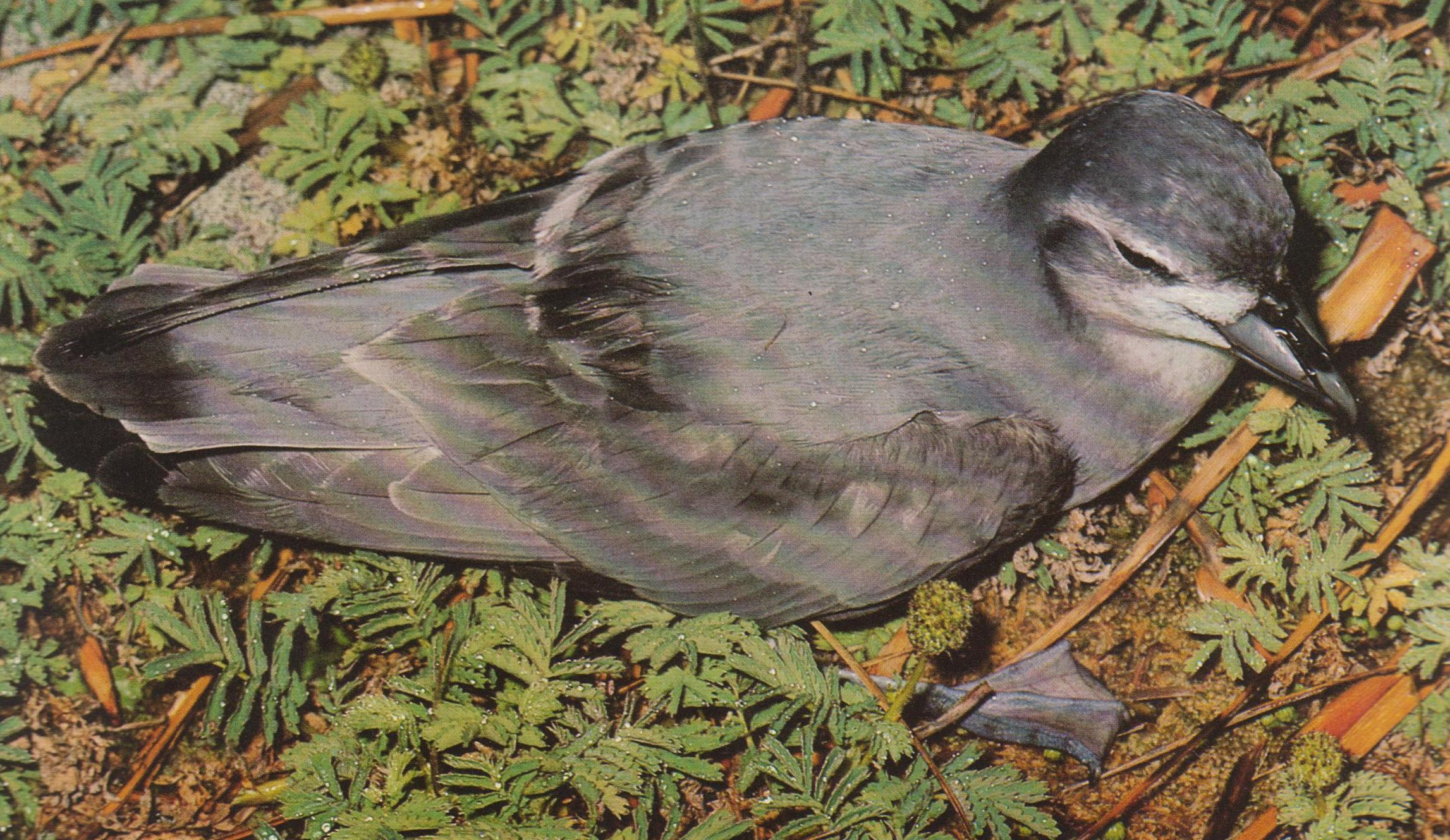

Conservation status
- Least Concern (IUCN 3.1)

Scientific classification
- Kingdom: Animalia
- Phylum: Chordata
- Class: Aves
- Order: Procellariiformes
- Family: Procellariidae
- Genus: Pachyptila
- Species: P. belcheri

Binomial name
- Pachyptila belcheri (Mathews, 1912)

= Slender-billed prion =

Species of bird

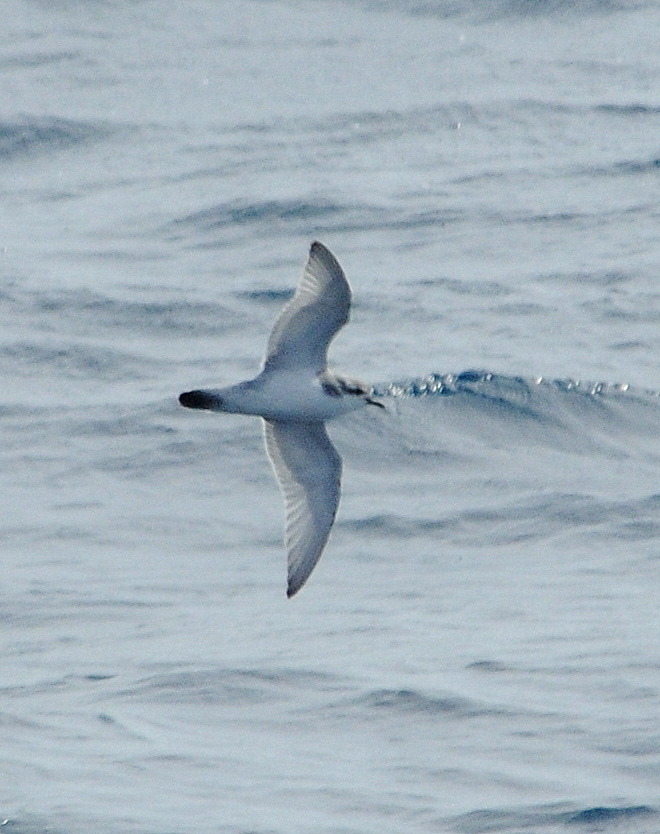
Thin-billed Prion (Pachyptila belcheri) in the Drake Passage

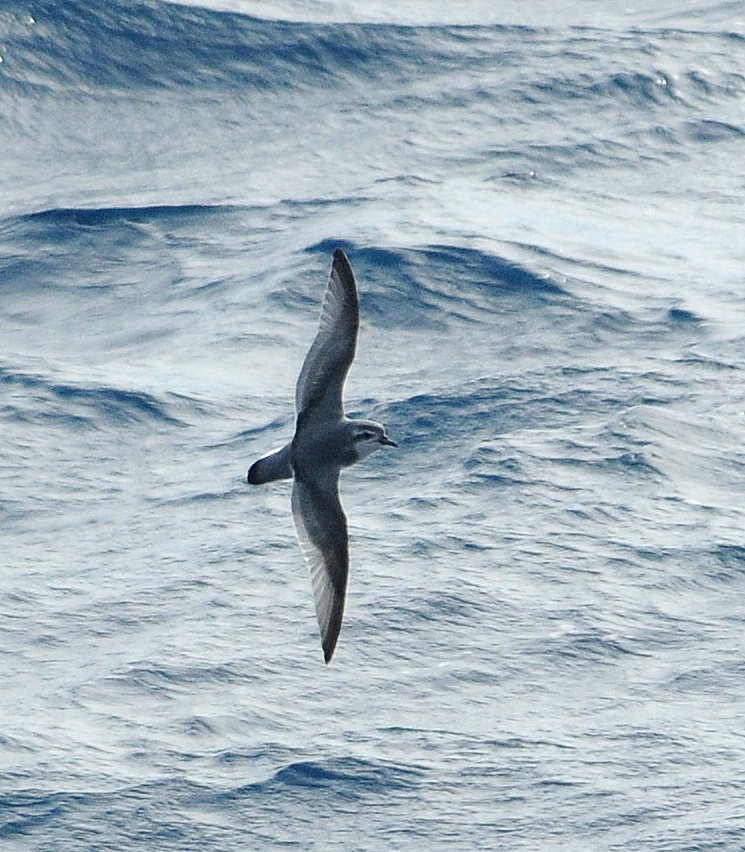
Thin-billed Prion (Pachyptila belcheri) in the Drake Passage

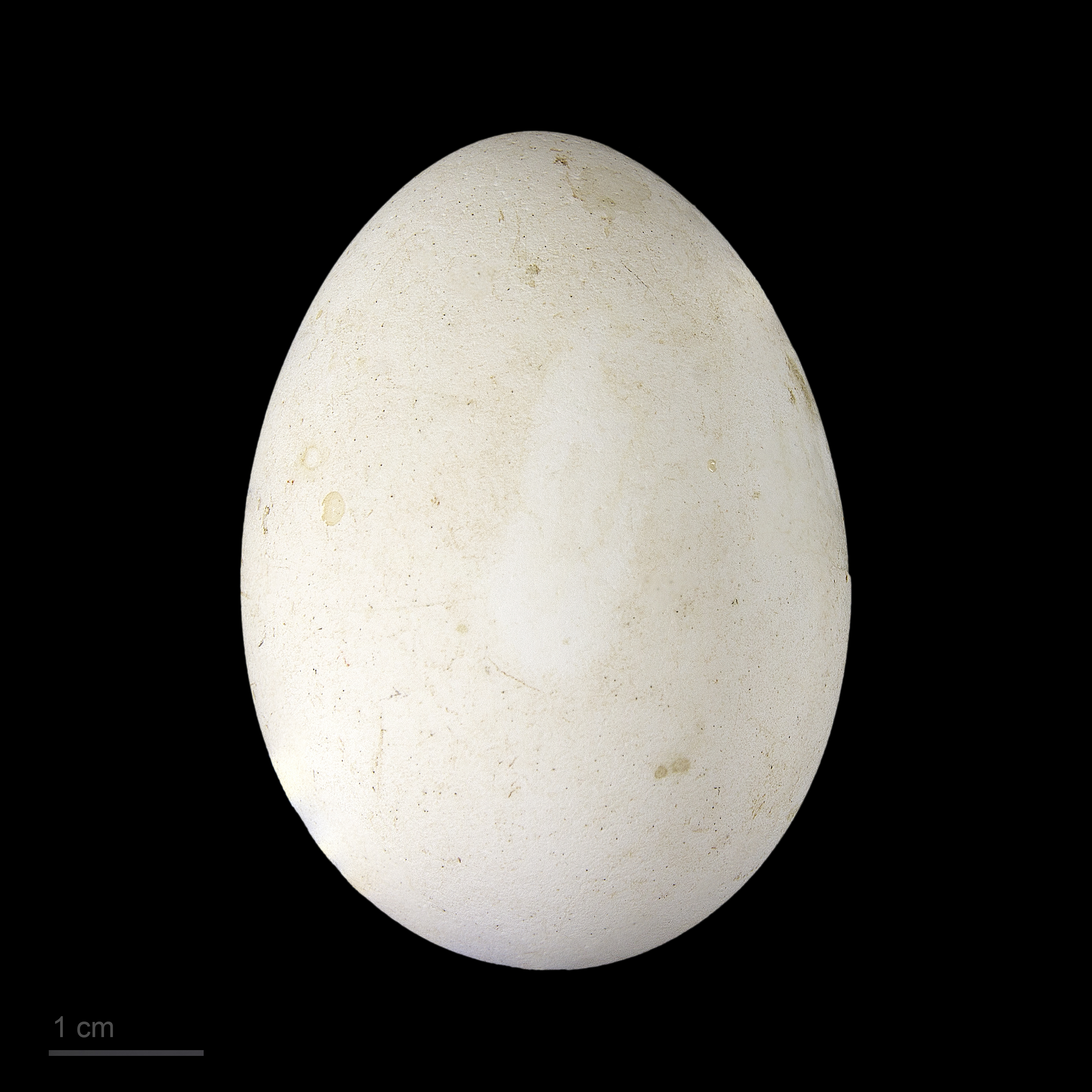
Pachyptila belcheri - MHNT

The slender-billed prion (Pachyptila belcheri), or thin-billed prion, is a species of petrel, a seabird in the family Procellariidae. It is found in the southern oceans.

== Taxonomy ==
The slender-billed prion was formally described in 1912 by the Australian born ornithologist Gregory Mathews under the binomial name Heteroprion belcheri. The prion is now placed with the other prions in the genus Pachyptila that was introduced in 1811 by the German zoologist Johann Karl Wilhelm Illiger. The genus name combines the Ancient Greek pakhus meaning "dense" or "thick" with ptilon meaning "feather" or "plumage". The specific epithet belcheri was chosen in recognition of the Australian judge and amateur ornithologist Charles Belcher who had found the first specimens dead on a beach near the town of Geelong in the Australian state of Victoria. The species is considered to be monotypic: no subspecies are recognised.

The name prion comes from the Greek word priōn, meaning "saw", a reference of the serrated edges of the birds' saw-like bill.

The slender-billed prion is a member of the Pachyptila genus, which, in combination with the genus Halobaena (whose single species is the blue petrel) makes up the polyphyletic traditional tribe of prions (or whalebirds). Prions are small petrels in the order Procellariiformes which share certain identifying features. First, they have nasal passages that attach to the upper bill called naricorns, although their nostrils are on top of the upper bill. Procellariiformes' bills are also unique in that they are split into between 7 and 9 horny plates; hence see below, under Etymology that the name prion within this order connotes a saw-like serrated edge to the bill. Prions produce a stomach oil made up of wax esters and triglycerides that is stored in the proventriculus, which they use against predators as well as an energy rich food source for chicks and for the adults during their long flights. Finally, they also have a salt gland, situated above the nasal passage, which helps desalinate their bodies by excreting a high saline solution from their nose, relieving excessive salt for their metabolism as they imbibe a high volume of salty ocean water.

== Description ==
Like all prions, they are blue-grey above and white below with a dark "M" on their back to their wingtips. They have a white eyebrow and a dark line extending from below the eye almost to the neck. Their tail is wedge-shaped and grey with a black tip, their bill is blue-grey, and their feet are pale blue.

== Distribution and habitat ==
The slender-billed prion spends all their non-breeding time over ocean water in the southern oceans. When breeding, they will do so on the Crozet Islands, the Kerguelen Islands, the Falkland Islands and Noir Island off the coast of southern Chile.

== Behaviour ==
=== Food and feeding ===
Like all prions, the slender-billed eat zooplankton, by filtering it through their bill.

=== Breeding ===
They are annual breeders and will lay one egg. Both parents will then incubate the egg and care for the young until they fledge.

== Conservation status ==
This species has a very large range and their estimated population is 7,000,000, allowing the IUCN to classify them as Least Concern.

== Sources ==
- BirdLife International (2009). "Thin-billed Prion Pachyptila belcheri - BirdLife Species Factsheet". Data Zone.
- Clements, James (2007). The Clements Checklist of the Birds of the World (6th ed.). Ithaca, NY: Cornell University Press. ISBN 978-0-8014-4501-9.
- Double, M. C. (2003). "Procellariiformes (Tubenosed Seabirds)". In Hutchins, Michael; Jackson, Jerome A.; Bock, Walter J.; et al. (eds.). Grzimek's Animal Life Encyclopedia. Vol. 8 Birds I Tinamous and Ratites to Hoatzins. Joseph E. Trumpey, Chief Scientific Illustrator (2nd ed.). Farmington Hills, MI: Gale Group. pp. 107–111. ISBN 0-7876-5784-0.
- Ehrlich, Paul R.; Dobkin, David, S.; Wheye, Darryl (1988). The Birders Handbook (First ed.). New York, NY: Simon & Schuster. pp. 29–31. ISBN 0-671-65989-8.
- Gotch, A. F. (1995) [1979]. "Albatrosses, Fulmars, Shearwaters, and Petrels". Latin Names Explained A Guide to the Scientific Classifications of Reptiles, Birds & Mammals. New York, NY: Facts on File. p. 192. ISBN 0-8160-3377-3.
- Maynard, B. J. (2003). "Shearwaters, petrels, and fulmars (Procellariidae)". In Hutchins, Michael; Jackson, Jerome A.; Bock, Walter J.; et al. (eds.). Grzimek's Animal Life Encyclopedia. Vol. 8 Birds I Tinamous and Ratites to Hoatzins. Joseph E. Trumpey, Chief Scientific Illustrator (2nd ed.). Farmington Hills, MI: Gale Group. pp. 123–133. ISBN 0-7876-5784-0.
- ZipCode Zoo (19 Jun 2009). "Pachyptila belcheri (Slender-Billed Prion)". BayScience Foundation.
