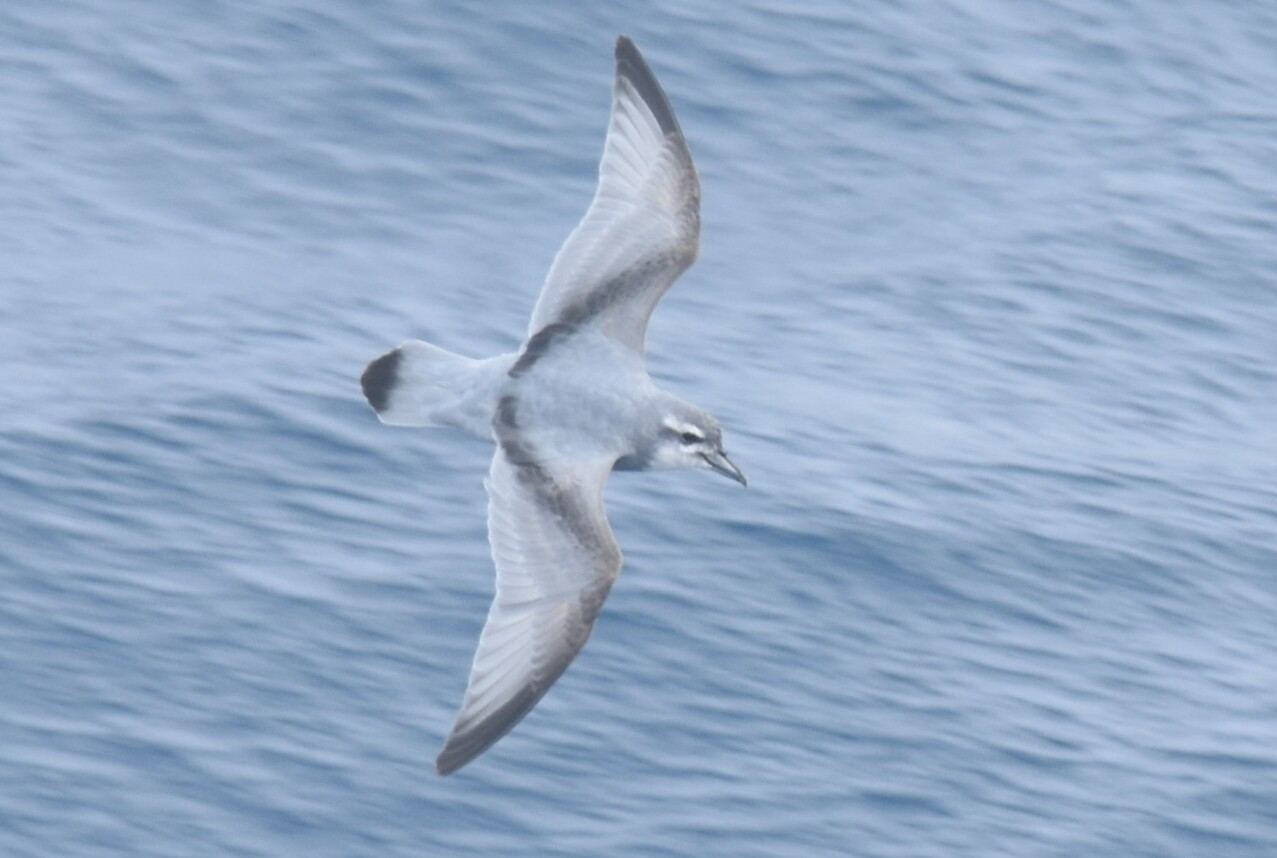
- Salvin's prion near Prince Edward Islands

Conservation status
- Least Concern (IUCN 3.1)

Scientific classification
- Kingdom: Animalia
- Phylum: Chordata
- Class: Aves
- Order: Procellariiformes
- Family: Procellariidae
- Genus: Pachyptila
- Species: P. salvini

Binomial name
- Pachyptila salvini (Mathews, 1912)

Subspecies
- P. salvini salvini (Mathews, 1912); P. salvini macgillivrayi

= Salvin's prion =

Species of bird

Salvin's prion (Pachyptila salvini), also known as the medium-billed prion, is a species of seabird in the petrel family Procellariidae.

== Taxonomy ==
Salvin's prion is a member of the genus Pachyptila and of the subgenus Salviprion Mathews, 1943. Along with the blue petrel, they make up the prions. They in turn are members of the family Procellariidae, and the order Procellariiformes. The prions are small and typically eat just zooplankton; however as a member of the Procellariiformes, they share certain identifying features. First, they have nasal passages that attach to the upper bill called naricorns. Although the nostrils on the prion are on top of the upper bill. The bills of Procellariiformes are also unique in that they are split into between 7 and 9 horny plates. They produce a stomach oil made up of wax esters and triglycerides that is stored in the proventriculus. This is used against predators as well as an energy rich food source for chicks and for the adults during their long flights. Finally, they also have a salt gland that is situated above the nasal passage and helps desalinate their bodies, due to the high amount of ocean water that they imbibe. It excretes a high saline solution from their nose.

== Etymology ==
The name Pachyptila comes from the Greek words pakhus and ptilon. Pakhus means "thick" or "stout" and ptilon means "a feather". Also from the Greek language, prion comes from the word priōn meaning "a saw", which is in reference to its serrated edges of its bill. The species is named for the British ornithologist Osbert Salvin.

== Description ==
Salvin's prion is a small 29 cm (11 in) petrel with grey and white plumage, and a blue bill. Like the broad-billed prion it has lamellae in its bill in order to filter seawater for food.

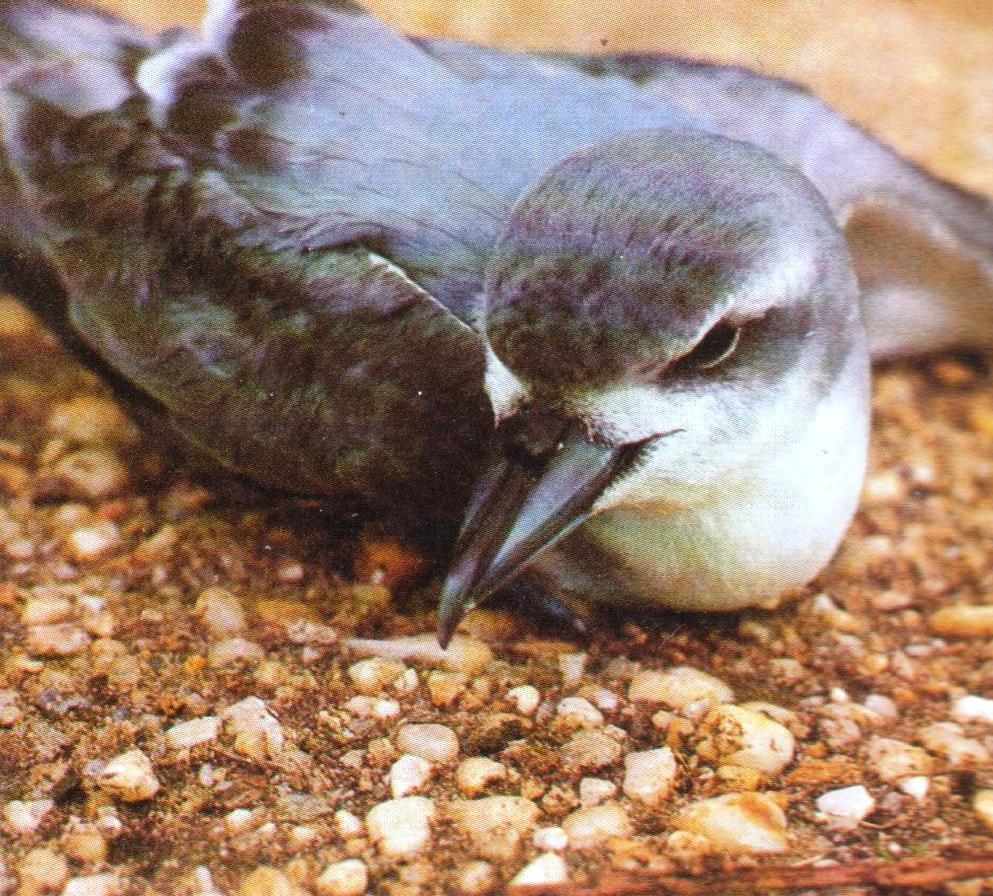

== Behaviour ==
=== Breeding ===
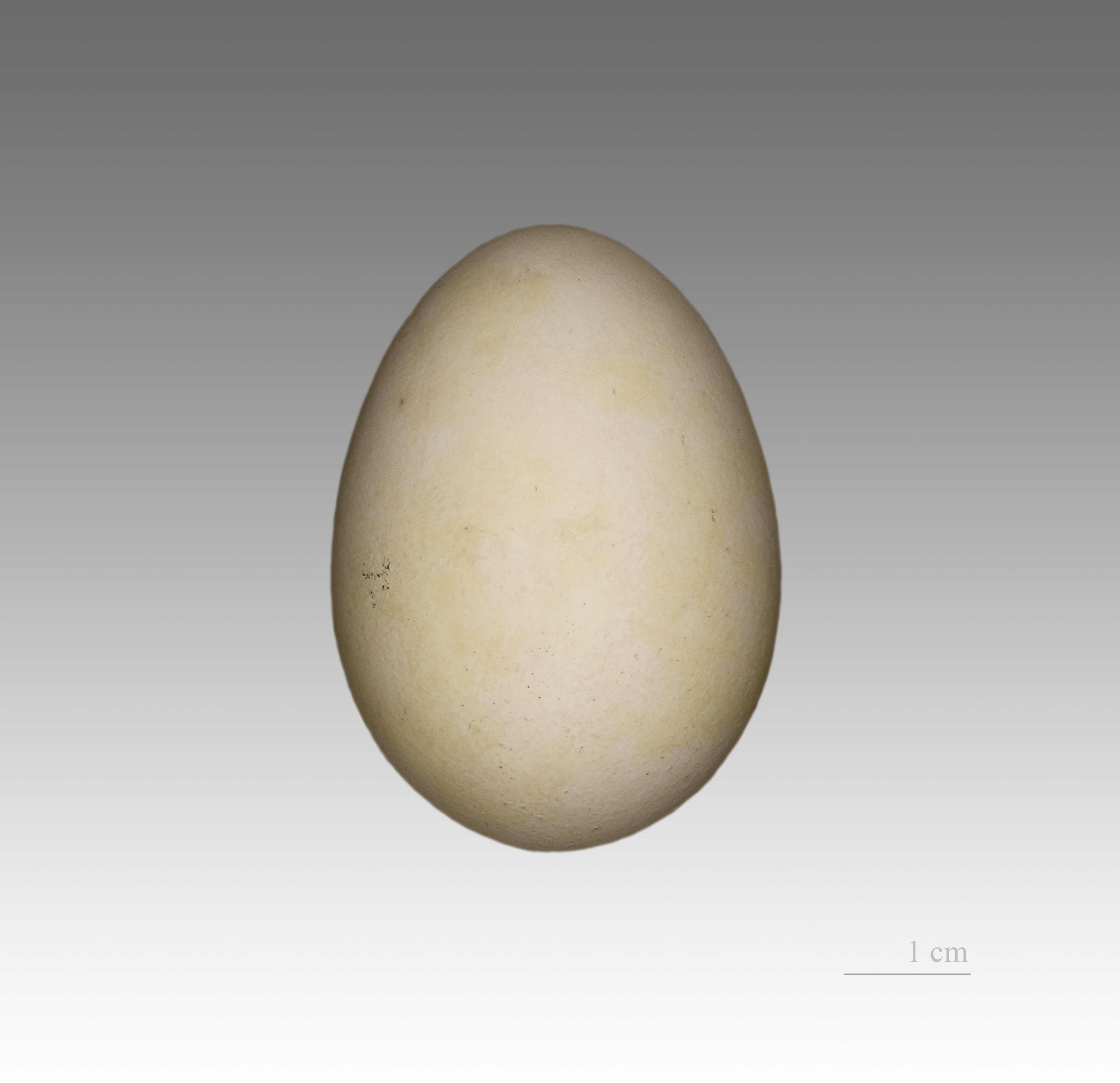
Pachyptila salvini- MHNT

This small prion breeds colonially on a number of subantarctic islands in the southern Indian Ocean. The colonies of medium-billed prions are attended nocturnally in order to avoid predation by skuas. The nests are concealed in burrows usually dug into soil. Nests are attended regularly for several months prior to breeding. A single egg is laid in November or early December, which is incubated for around 50 days. Both parents share the incubation duties and feed the chick once it is hatched. The chicks fledge around 60 days after hatching.

=== Feeding ===
The main components of its diet are amphipods and krill, although it will also take fish and squid. In addition to filter feeding, food is obtained by seizing and hydroplaning.

== Range and habitat ==
The breeding distribution of the Salvin's prion is restricted to Crozet Islands and Prince Edward Island. Salvin's prion breeds principally on Île aux Cochons in the Crozet Islands, where four million pairs are thought to breed. Other breeding colonies include Prince Edward Island, St Paul Island and Amsterdam Island. At sea they range from South Africa eastwards to New Zealand.

== Conservation ==
Salvin's prion is not considered threatened with extinction. Although numbers have declined on some islands where rats and feral cats have been introduced, the world population is estimated at 12 million birds. Consequently, they are given a classification of Least Concern.
