= Noir Island =

Island in Magallanes Region, Chile

Native name: Isla Noir
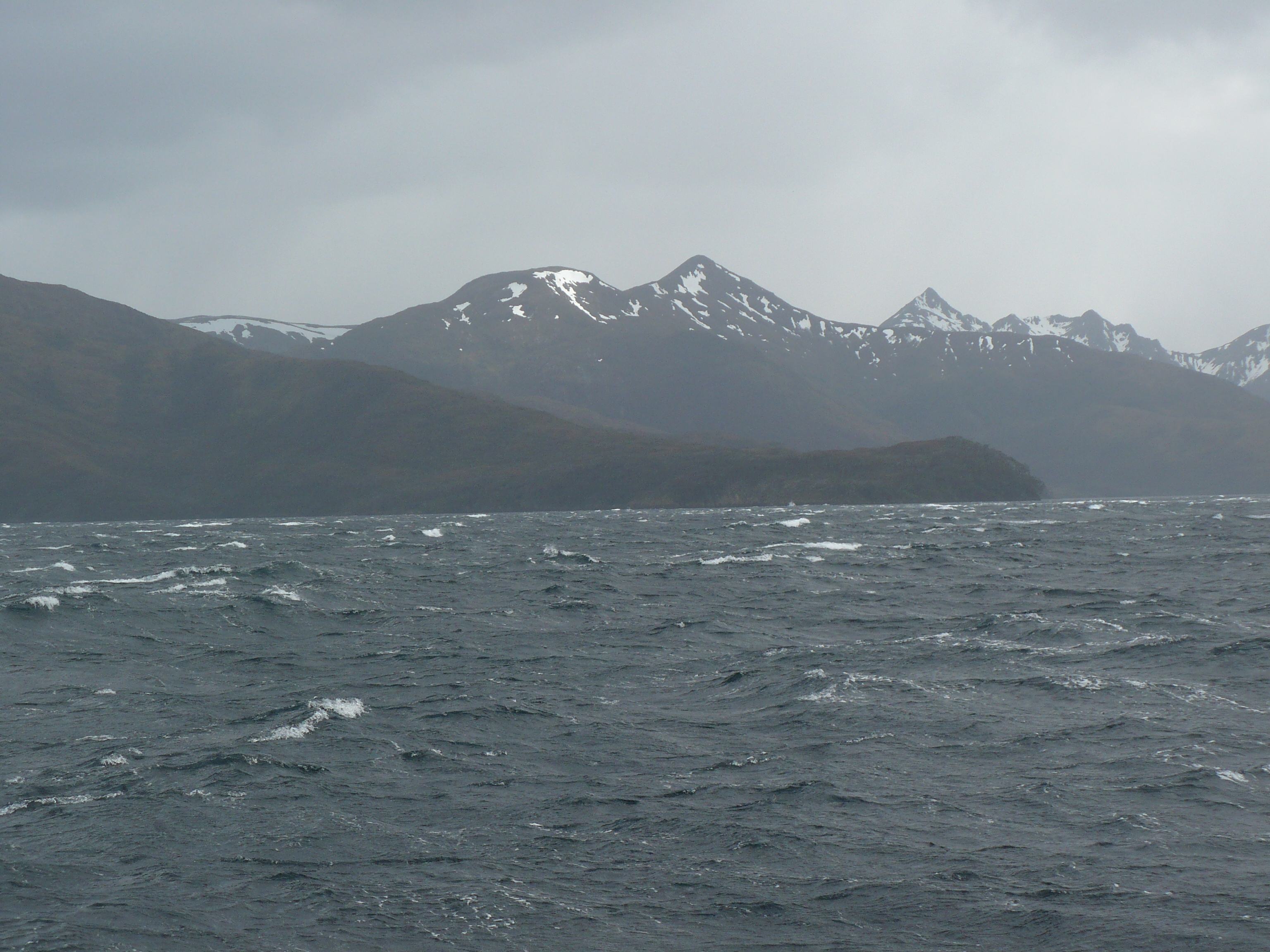

- Location within Southern Patagonia

Geography
- Coordinates: 54°29′S 73°02′W
- Archipelago: Tierra del Fuego
- Adjacent to: Pacific Ocean
- Area: 22,500 ha (56,000 acres)
- Length: 20 km (12 mi)
- Width: 8 km (5 mi)
- Highest elevation: 183 m (600 ft)

Administration
- Chile
- Region: Magallanes Region
- Province: Punta Arenas
- Commune: Punta Arenas

Additional information
- NGA UFI -893783

Noir Island (Spanish: Isla Noir) is an island located 27 km (17 mi) west of Tierra del Fuego. Cabo Noir (sometimes called "Cape Noir" in English) is the south-western cape of Isla Noir. The island reaches a height of approximately 183 m (600 ft).

== Important Bird Area ==
The island has been designated an Important Bird Area (IBA) by BirdLife International because it supports significant populations of southern rockhopper and macaroni penguins, southern giant petrels, Chilean skuas and striated caracaras.

== In literature ==
Cape Noir plays a crucial role in a dramatic episode in Patrick O'Brian's novel, The Golden Ocean, which is based on the historical events of Commodore George Anson's circumnavigation of the world. In the story, a squadron of ships believes they have successfully rounded Cape Horn westwards and reached safe waters. However, upon sighting Cape Noir, they are confronted with the shocking realization that their longitude reckoning is grossly in error.

The episode is described by the chaplain of the Centurion:

It was indeed most wonderful, that the currents should have driven us to the eastward with such strength; for the whole squadron esteemed themselves upwards of ten degrees more westerly than this land, so that in running down, by our account, about nineteen degrees of longitude, we had not really advanced half that distance. And now, instead of having our labours and anxieties relieved by approaching a warmer climate and more tranquil seas, we were to steer again to the southward, and were again to combat those western blasts, which had so often terrified us; and this too, when we were greatly enfeebled by our men falling sick, and dying apace, and when our spirits, dejected by a long continuance at sea, and by our late disappointment, were much less capable of supporting us in the various difficulties, which we could not but expect in this new undertaking.
