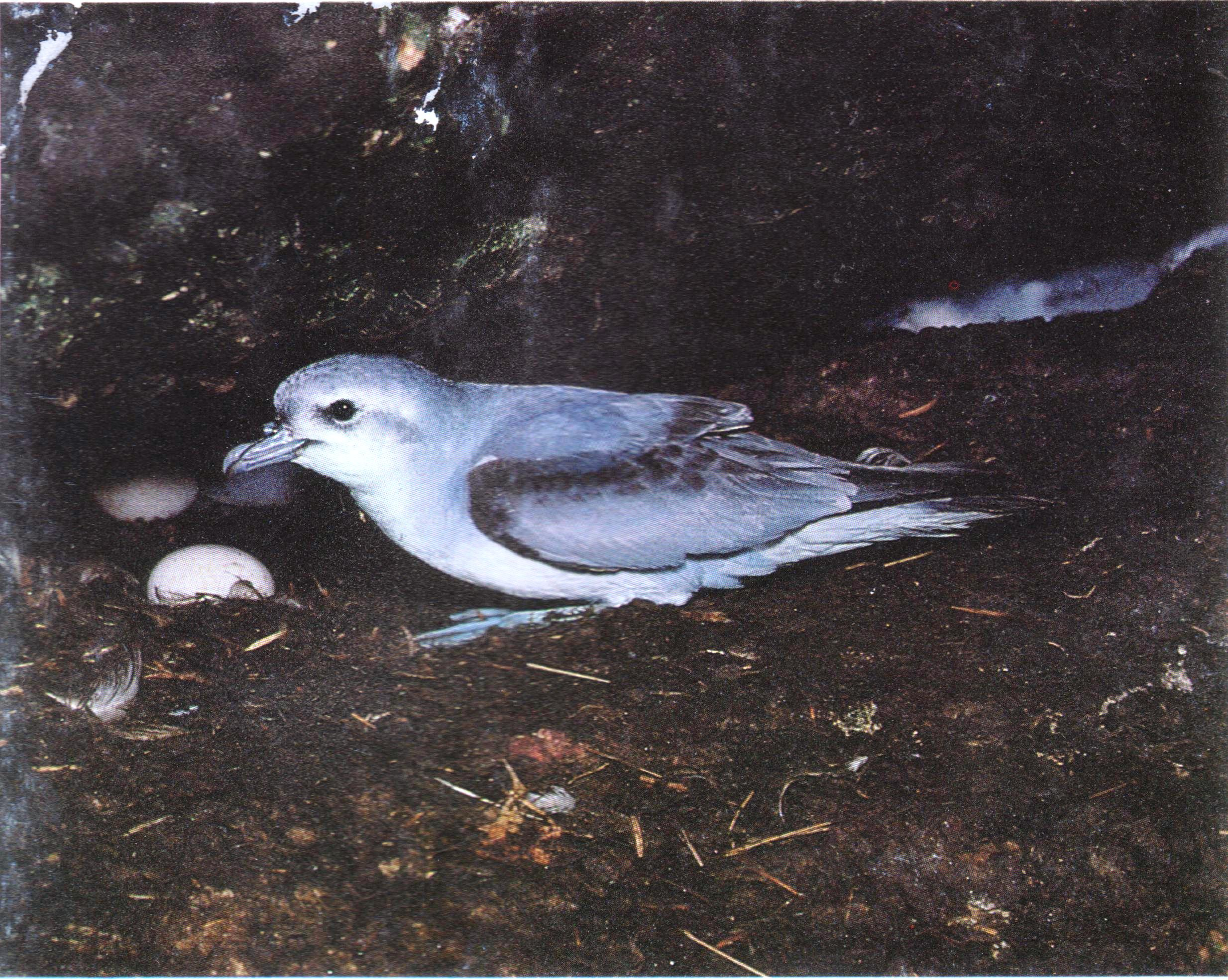

Conservation status
- Least Concern (IUCN 3.1)

Scientific classification
- Kingdom: Animalia
- Phylum: Chordata
- Class: Aves
- Order: Procellariiformes
- Family: Procellariidae
- Genus: Pachyptila
- Species: P. turtur

Binomial name
- Pachyptila turtur (Kuhl, 1820)

= Fairy prion =

Species of bird

The fairy prion (Pachyptila turtur) is a small seabird with the standard prion plumage of blue-grey upperparts with a prominent dark "M" marking and white underneath. The sexes are alike. It is a small prion which frequents the low subantarctic and subtropic seas.

== Taxonomy ==
The fairy prion was formally described in 1820 by the German naturalist Heinrich Kuhl under the binomial name Procellaria turtur. It is now placed with the other prions in the genus Pachyptila, introduced in 1811 by Johann Karl Wilhelm Illiger. The genus name combines the Ancient Greek pakhus , meaning "dense" or "thick", with ptilon, meaning "feather" or "plumage". The specific epithet turtur is Latin for "turtle dove". The word prion comes from the Ancient Greek word priōn, meaning "a saw", which refers to the serrated edges of its bill.

The fairy prion is a member of the genus Pachyptila and of the subgenus Pseudoprion Coues, 1866. Along with the blue petrel, they make up the prions. They in turn are members of the family Procellariidae, and the order Procellariiformes. Prions are small and typically eat just zooplankton but, as members of the Procellariiformes, they share certain identifying features. They have nasal passages, called naricorns, that attach to the upper bill, as opposed to the nostrils on the albatross which are on the sides of the bill. The bills of Procellariiformes are also unique in that they are split into between seven and nine horny plates.

The birds produce a stomach oil made up of wax esters and triglycerides that is stored in the proventriculus, and is used against predators, as well as providing an energy rich food source for chicks, and for the adults during their long flights. They also have a salt gland above the nasal passage which excretes a high saline solution from their nose, helping to desalinate their bodies, due to the large quantity of ocean water that they imbibe.

== Description ==
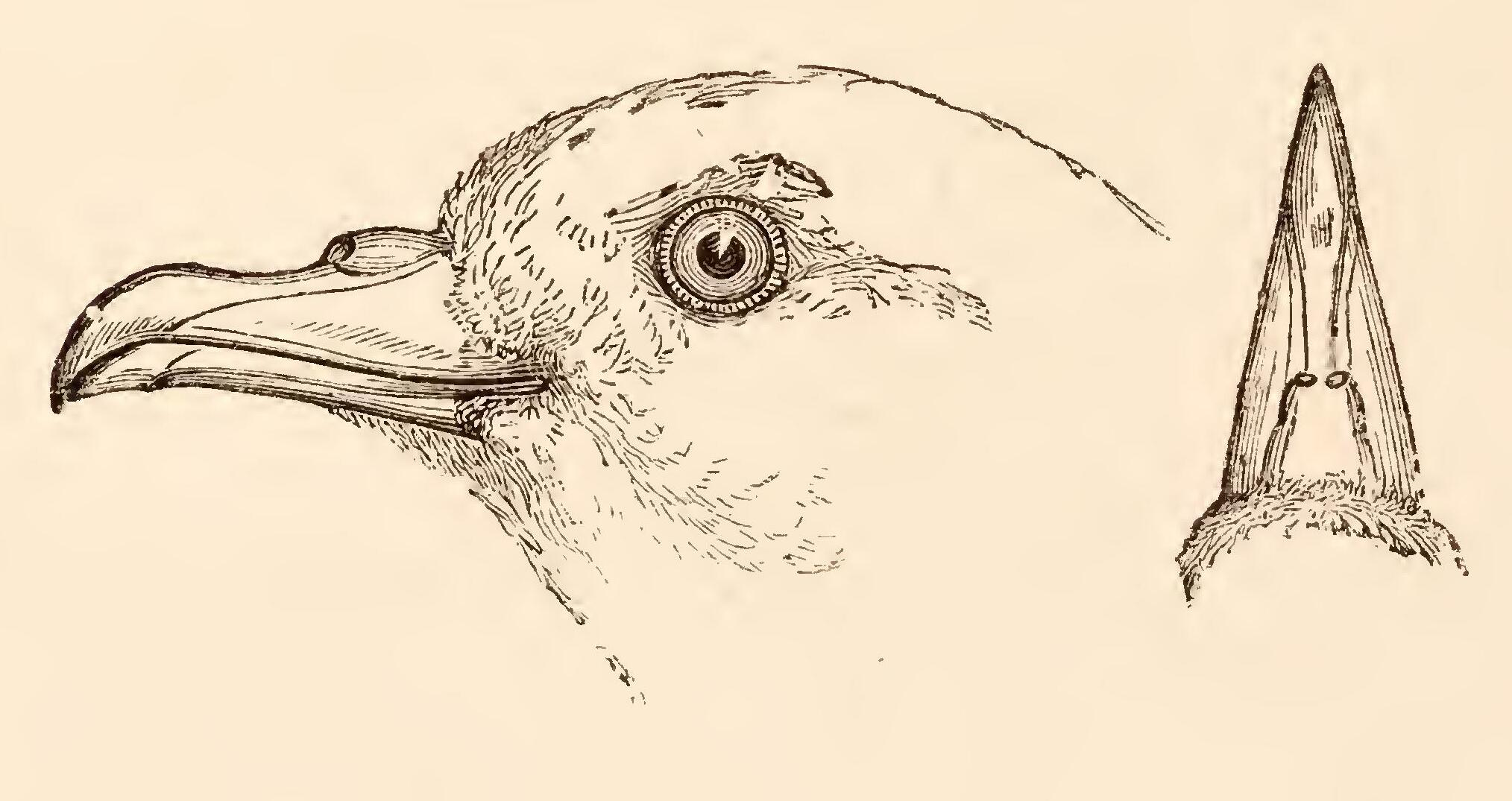
Illustration of the features of the fairy prion's head and beak, 1888

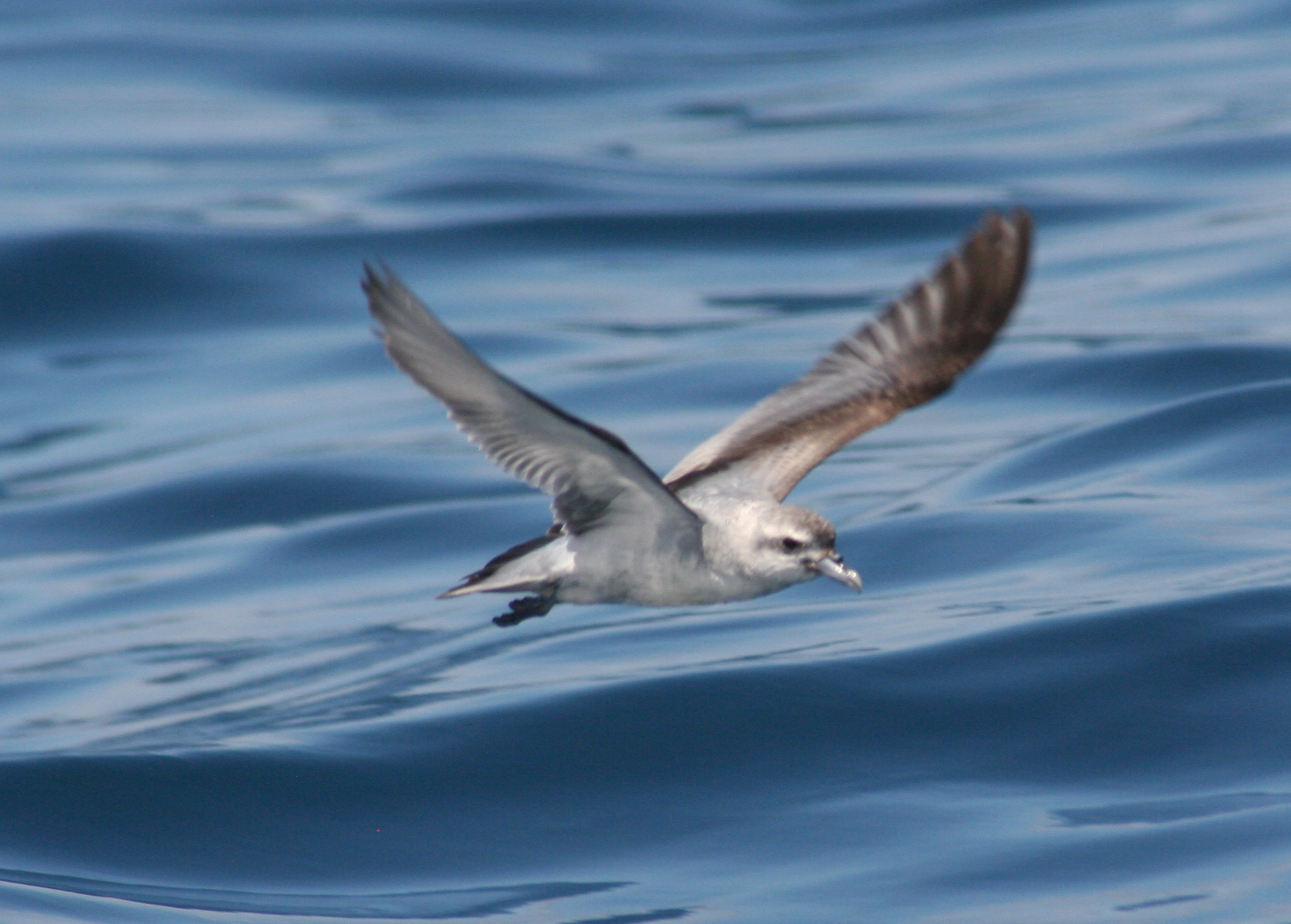
Fairy prion off the coast of the Hauraki Gulf, New Zealand.

The fairy prion is around 25 cm (9.8 in) in length, with a wingspan of 56 cm (22 in). The plumage is blue-grey on its upperparts with a dark "M" extending to the wingtips. The tail is wedge-shaped with a dark tip. The underparts are mostly white. It has a pale blue bill with blue legs and feet. The sexes are alike. In appearance, it is very similar to the fulmar prion (Pachyptila crassirostris), and the two species cannot be distinguished at sea.

== Distribution and habitat ==
The fairy prion is found throughout oceans and coastal areas in the Southern Hemisphere. Their colonies can be found in the Falklands Isles, the Bass Strait Islands of Australia, the Crozet Isles, as well as the Chatham Islands, the Antipodes Islands, and the Snares Islands of New Zealand amongst many other places.

== Behavior ==
=== Food and feeding ===
The diet consists mainly of planktonic crustaceans and tiny fish, which they catch by either seizing prey while on the surface or by dipping their bill into the water while in flight.

=== Breeding ===
They breed colonially and prefer small islands. Nests are situated in soil, hidden by vegetation, and dug with the bill or feet, or in a hollow in a crevice. When coming back to their nest at night, they will coo softly and listen for their mate.

== Conservation ==
Widespread and common throughout its large range, with an estimated population of 5,000,000, the fairy prion is evaluated as least concern on the IUCN Red List of Threatened Species. Its range is 24,600,000 km^{2} (9,500,000 sq mi).

== Sources ==
- Double, M. C. (2003). "Procellariiformes (Tubenosed Seabirds)". In Hutchins, Michael; Jackson, Jerome A.; Bock, Walter J.; Olendorf, Donna (eds.). Grzimek's Animal Life Encyclopedia. Vol. 8 Birds I Tinamous and Ratites to Hoatzins. Joseph E. Trumpey, Chief Scientific Illustrator (2nd ed.). Farmington Hills, MI: Gale Group. pp. 107–111. ISBN 0-7876-5784-0.
- Ehrlich, Paul R.; Dobkin, David, S.; Wheye, Darryl (1988). The Birders Handbook (First ed.). New York, NY: Simon & Schuster. pp. 29–31. ISBN 0-671-65989-8.
- Gotch, A. F. (1995) [1979]. "Albatrosses, Fulmars, Shearwaters, and Petrels". Latin Names Explained A Guide to the Scientific Classifications of Reptiles, Birds & Mammals. New York, NY: Facts on File. p. 192. ISBN 0-8160-3377-3.
- Harrison, C.; Greensmith, A. (1993). Bunting, E. (ed.). Birds of the World. New York, NY: Dorling Kindersley. p. 51. ISBN 1-56458-295-7.
- Maynard, B. J. (2003). "Shearwaters, petrels, and fulmars (Procellariidae)". In Hutchins, Michael; Jackson, Jerome A.; Bock, Walter J.; Olendorf, Donna (eds.). Grzimek's Animal Life Encyclopedia. Vol. 8 Birds I Tinamous and Ratites to Hoatzins. Joseph E. Trumpey, Chief Scientific Illustrator (2nd ed.). Farmington Hills, MI: Gale Group. pp. 123–133. ISBN 0-7876-5784-0.
