= Stomach oil =

Oil found in the proventriculus of some birds

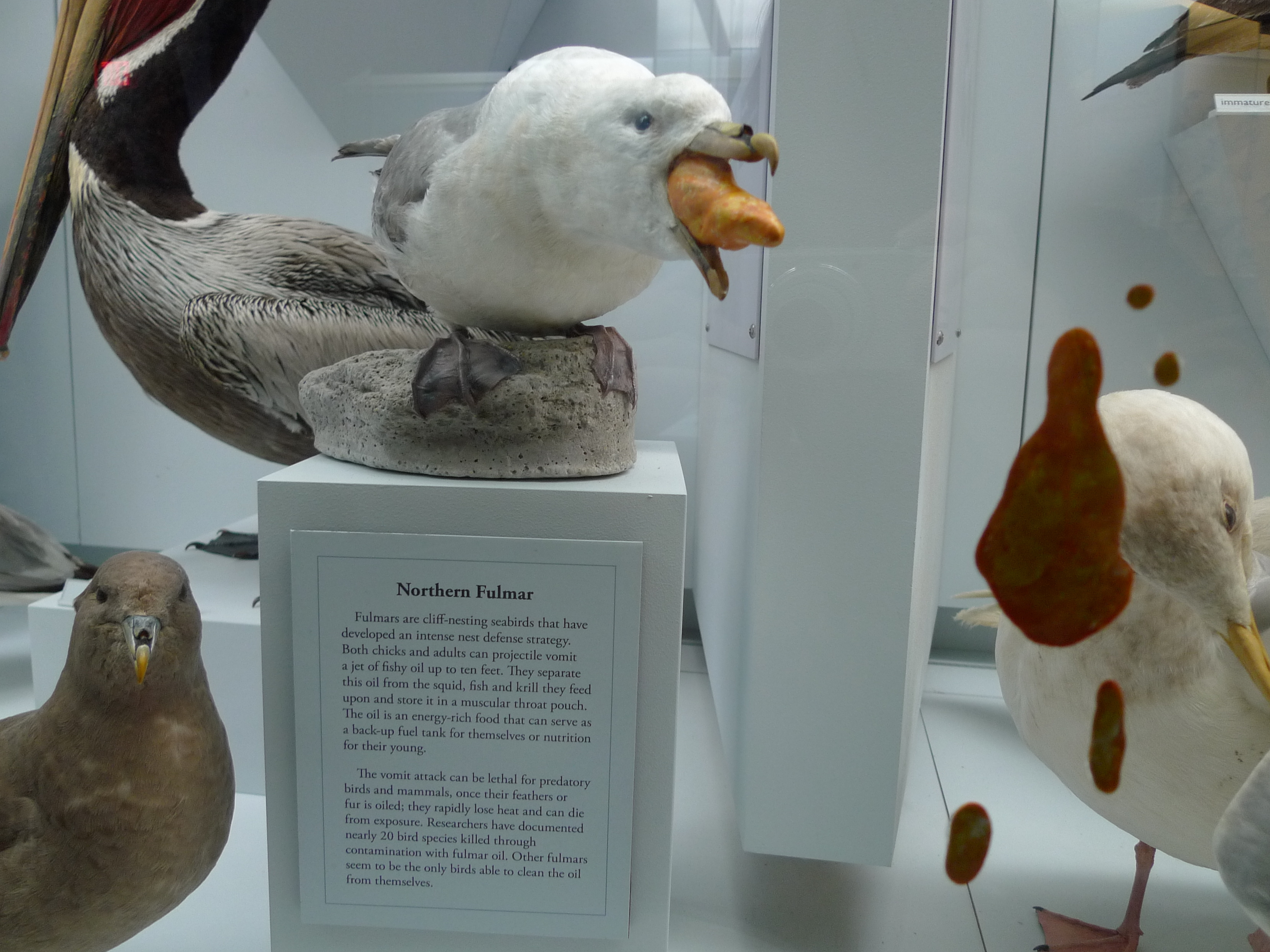
A museum display showing a mockup of the northern fulmar's stomach oil attack, at the Santa Barbara Museum of Natural History

Stomach oil is the light oil composed of neutral dietary lipids found in the proventriculus (fore-gut) of birds in the order Procellariiformes. All albatrosses, procellarids (gadfly petrels and shearwaters) and northern and austral storm petrels use the oil. The only Procellariiformes that do not are the diving petrels.

The chemical make up of stomach oil varies from species to species and between individuals, but almost always contains both wax esters and triglycerides. Other compounds found in stomach oil include glycerol ethers, pristane and squalene. Stomach oil has low viscosity and will solidify into a hard wax if allowed to cool.

It was once thought that stomach oil was a secretion of the proventriculus, but it is now known to be a residue of the diet created by digestion of the prey items such as krill, squid, copepods and fish. It is thought to serve several functions for Procellariiformes, primarily as an energy store; its calorific value is around 40 MJ/kg (9.6 kcal per gram), which is only slightly lower than the value for diesel oil. For this reason a great deal more energy can be stored in oil form as opposed to undigested prey. This can be a real advantage for species that range over huge distances to provide food for hungry chicks, or as a store for lean times when ranging across the sea looking for patchy areas of prey.

Surface nesting petrels and albatrosses can eject this oil out of their mouths (not nostrils, as has sometimes been suggested) towards attacking predators or conspecific rivals. This oil can be deadly to birds, as it can cause matting of the feathers leading to the loss of flight or water repellency. Against threatening mammals (including humans) it is not outright dangerous, but due to its extremely offensive smell it is usually highly repulsive and liable to spoil a predator's hunting success for quite some time. The smell of the hydrophobic oil cannot be removed with water, and can persist (e.g. on clothing) for months or even years.

== See also ==
- Crop milk
