= Proventriculus =

Bird digestive organ

The proventriculus is part of the digestive system of birds. An analogous organ exists in insects and many other invertebrates.

== Birds ==
The proventriculus is a standard part of avian anatomy and is a rod-shaped organ, located between the esophagus and the gizzard of most birds. It is generally a glandular part of the stomach that may store and/or commence the digestion of food before it progresses to the gizzard. The primary function of the proventriculus is to secrete hydrochloric acid (HCl) and digestive enzymes such as pepsinogen into the digestive compartments that will churn the ingested material through muscular mechanisms.

Thomas Cecere (College of Veterinary Medicine of Virginia Tech) says of the proventriculus: "The proventriculus is the glandular portion of the avian compound stomach, and a rather peculiar organ it is. There's nothing like it in mammals."

Anatomy of the avian digestive system. The proventriculus is located early in the digestive tract, and is associated with the gizzard.

=== Secretions ===
The secretory glands that line the proventriculus give it the nickname of the "true stomach", as it secretes the same components as a mammalian stomach. It contains glands that secrete HCl and pepsinogen. The gastric glands of birds only have one type of cell that produces both HCl and pepsinogen, unlike mammals, which have different cell types for each of those productions. In mammals, HCl is secreted into the stomach by parietal cells, while chief cells secrete pepsinogen. In birds, the gastric glands of the proventriculus secrete both HCl and pepsinogen. Since pepsinogen is a zymogen, it is then activated to pepsin by the HCl. Once activated, pepsin can break the peptide bonds found in peptides and proteins. Since the digesta in birds has not been chewed, the secretions are important to break the particles down.

Hormones such as gastrin, bombesin, avian pancreatic polypeptide, and cholecystokinin affect the amount and concentration of the secretions by preventing or stimulating their release.

The roles of these secretions are to reduce the pH of the digesta and begin protein digestion; however, the distribution of the secretions differs depending on the avian species. These secretions cause the stomach to be very acidic, but the exact value will differ based on the species, as seen in the table below.

pH of proventriculus
Species	pH value
Chicken	4.8
Turkey	4.7
Pigeon	4.8
Duck	3.4

In petrels, the proventriculus is much larger and the mucus secretions are arranged into longitudinal ridges, which creates more surface area and more concentrated cells. These secrete a stomach oil, which is common in birds; it usually consists of undigested fatty acids, but can vary depending on the diet. Petrels also have a unique mechanism where they can shoot stomach oil from their beak when alarmed.

=== Motility ===
The muscle contractions of the gizzard push material back into the proventriculus, which then contracts to mix materials between the stomach compartments. This transfer of digested material can occur up to 4 times per minute, and the compartments can hold the stomach contents for thirty minutes to an hour. The contractions are regular and rhythmic, and are typically more frequent in males than in females because of higher androgen concentrations. Animals with lower androgen levels have less frequent and weaker contractions, which leads to less effective digestion of food.

=== Culinary use ===
Chicken proventriculus is eaten as street food in the Philippines. It is dipped in flour and deep fried until golden brown. It is best served with spiced vinegar and is often sold in a small kiosk. This dish is called proben.

== Insects ==
Insects also have a proventriculus structure in their digestive track, although the function and structure differ from avian proventriculi. They still contain secretions, but its main role is to help the passage of food and connect the crop to the stomach. The area within the proventriculus called the proventriculus bulb contains hairs or teeth like structures that help filter food and make it easier to digest. The proventriculus is organized in a central framework with muscles surrounding it on the outside. Different species have different combinations of longitudinal and circular muscles around it. In general, Hymenoptera contain sphincter muscles that add pressure on the digestive components and help pass the food into the midgut. Ants have more longitudinal muscles rather than circular muscles around the proventriculus, and its purpose is to act as a barrier to increase storage capacity of the crop. The amount of time that it can hold food depends on the strength of the muscles around the proventriculus bulb.

In bees, it not only controls the movement of food, but also helps separate nectar that will later be converted to honey, from pollen that will be digested. Since the proventriculus controls the passage of food into the digestive track, it is important that it is functional. Male bees are commonly affected by abnormal proventriculus conditions that prevent the passage of food. In most cases, the proventriculus is swollen and shaped differently. This can later affect how their body absorbs the nutrients since the proventriculus cannot effectively push food into the gut. The exact reason for this abnormality is still unknown, as there are a variety of possibilities. Since it seems to be a sex specific condition, some theories are: changes in the gut biome due to diet or sex-specific pathogens, variability compared to females, or differences in behavior that could affect their exposure to biological threats and toxins.

== See also ==
- Esophagus
- Crop (anatomy)
- Gizzard
