= Beaches of Cape Town =

List of beaches in the Cape Town metropolitan region

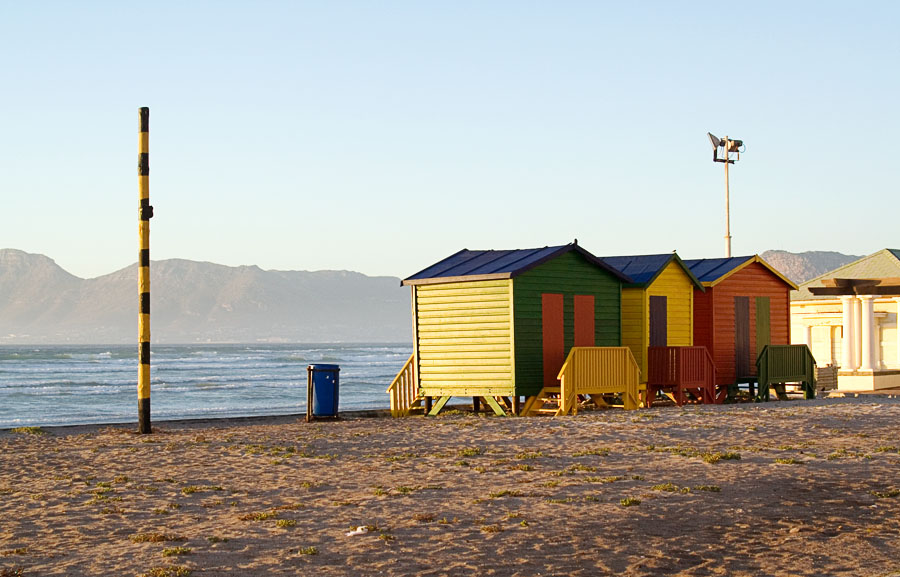
Muizenberg beach

The Cape Metropole (greater Cape Town) has a wide variety of beaches divided into three regions by the Cape Peninsula:

- False Bay, including the long sandy beach running from Gordon's Bay to Muizenberg, and the smaller beaches along the East side of the Cape Peninsula
- Atlantic Seaboard, along the West (Atlantic) side of the Cape Peninsula
- Blaauwberg/West Coast, along the Blaauwberg coast running Northwards from Cape Town

The sea in False Bay is about 6 degrees warmer than the Atlantic Seaboard and the West Coast.

In 2011, Lonely Planet listed Cape Town second in its list of the world's top 10 beach cities.

== False Bay ==
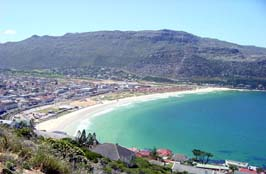
Fish Hoek beach

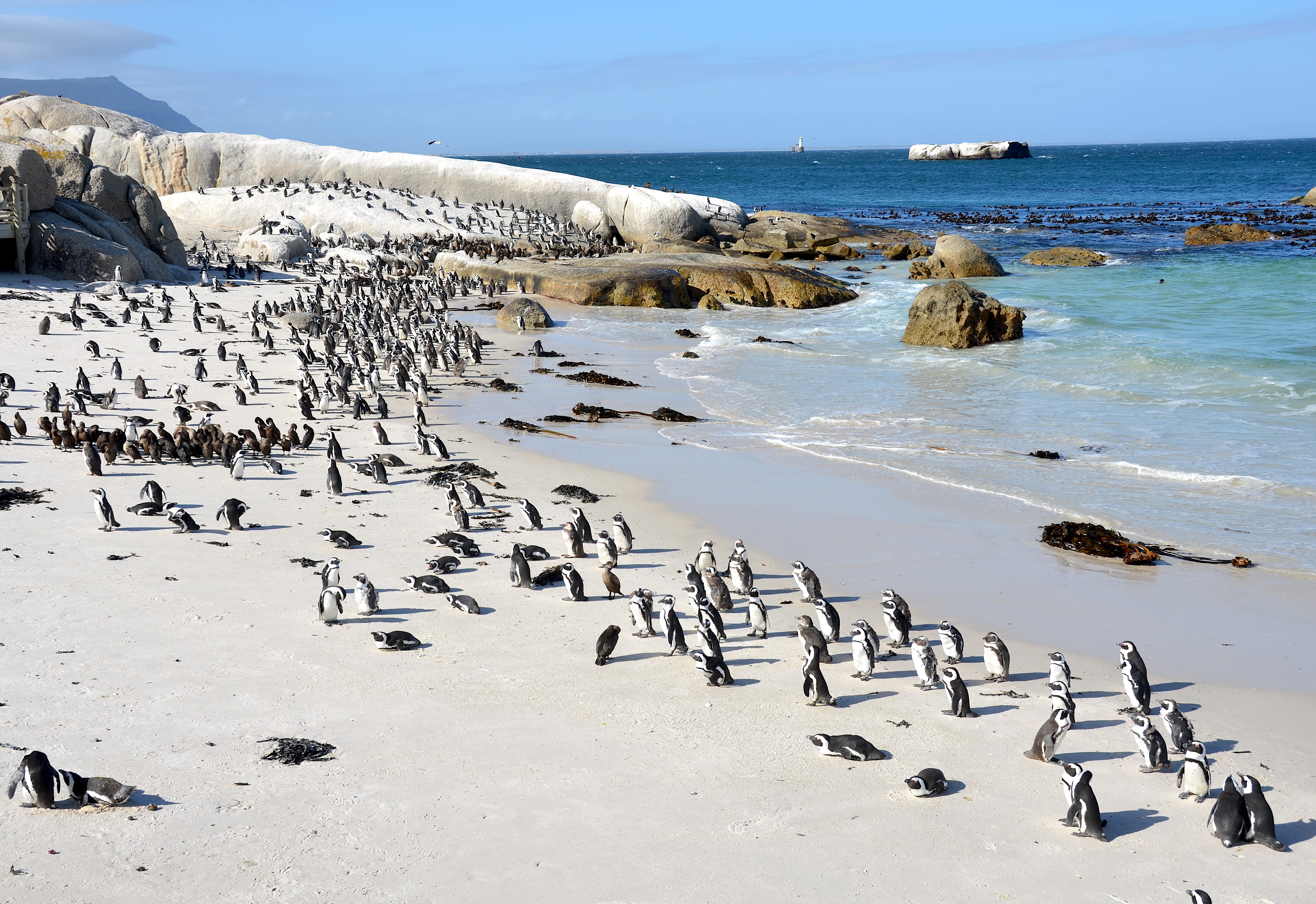
Boulders Beach populated with African Penguins

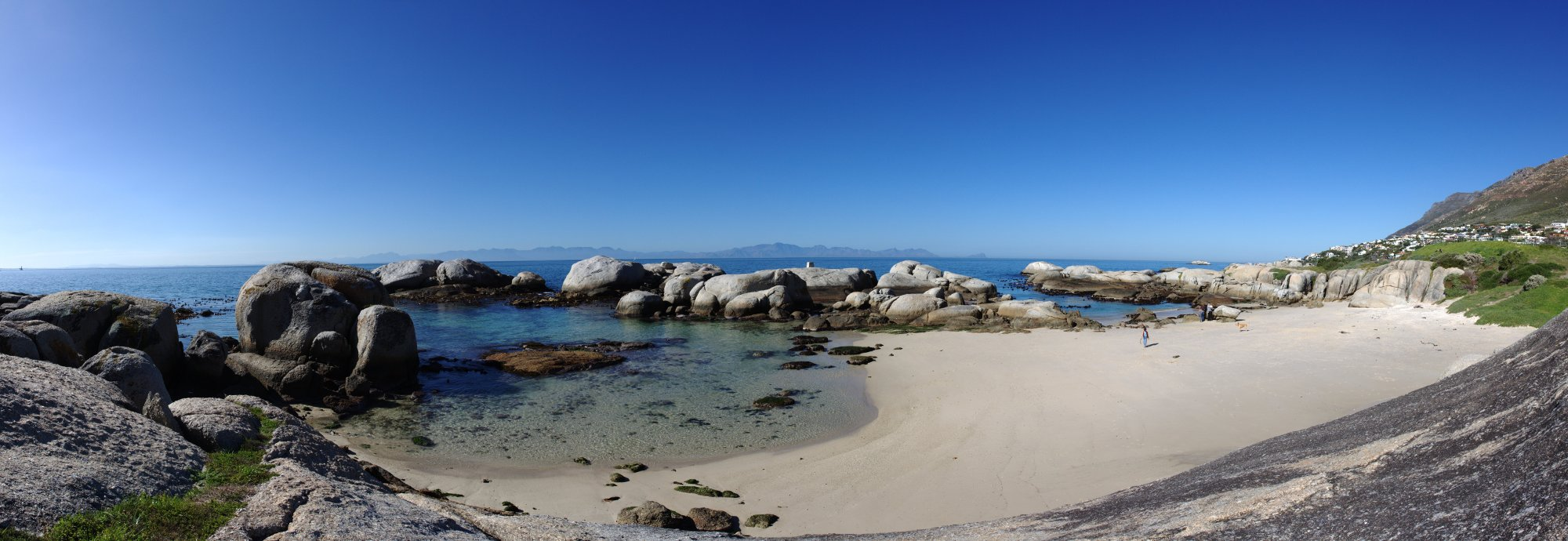
Windmill Beach

A long sandy beach runs more or less uninterrupted for the complete width of False Bay from Muizenberg to Gordon's Bay, forming the coast of the Cape Flats. Along the rocky Cape Peninsula, there are several smaller beaches below the mountains which are more protected from westerly swells than the beaches of the north shore. There is also a long sandy beach on the east side of the bay at the foot of the Kogelberg.

- Buffels Bay, Cape Peninsula
- Smitswinkel Bay
- Fishermans Beach
- Froggy Pond
- Windmill Beach 34°12′04″S 18°27′24″E is a small sandy beach below the golf course at Froggy Pond, Simon's Town. It is surrounded by large rounded granite boulders, and has two small coves separated by a group of large boulders. The south cove is relatively narrow and deeper, and opens to the bay towards the east. The north cove is wider, shallower and very protected from swell. It is a safe swimming area. The south cove is a popular site for scuba diving and is often used for entry-level training as the water is protected and entry and exit are easy.
- Boulders Beach
- Long Beach, Simon's Town
- Glencairn
- Fish Hoek
- Kalk Bay
- St James
- Muizenberg
- Strandfontein
- Monwabisi Beach, Khayelitsha
- Macassar beach
- Strand
- Gordon's Bay
- Kogel Bay (Kogelbaai), south of Gordon's Bay, near Rooiels.

== West coast of the Cape Peninsula ==
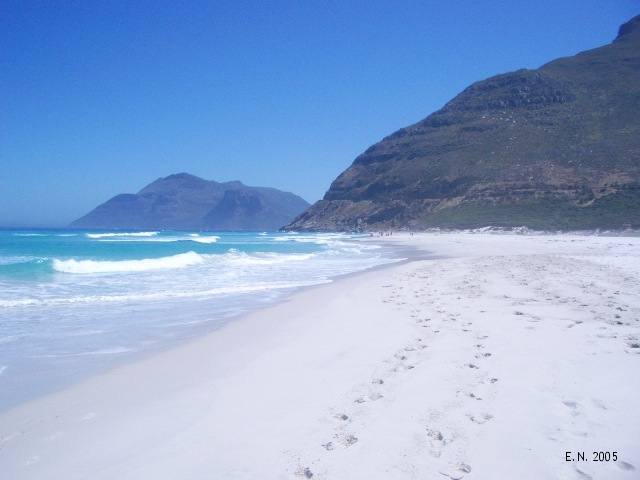
Noordhoek beach

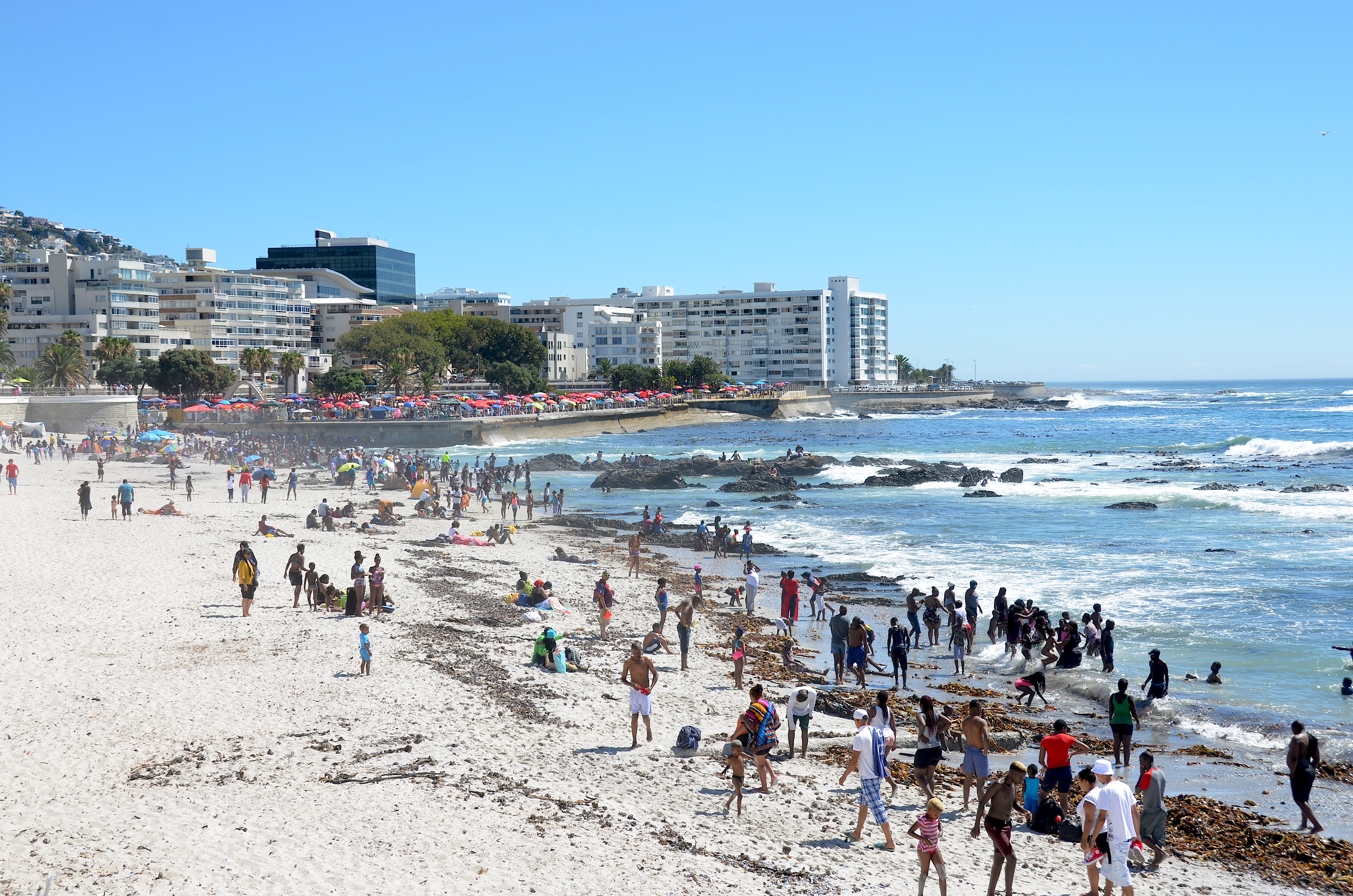
Sea Point beach

The Atlantic side of the Cape Peninsula faces West and thus is popular for expensive homes facing the sunset views. There are many beautiful beaches below the mountains of the peninsula.

- Scarborough
- Crayfish factory Beach (Witsands Beach)
- Kommetjie
- Noordhoek
- Hout Bay
- Sandy Bay
- Llandudno
- Camps Bay
- Glen Beach
- Clifton
- Sea Point

== West Coast ==
The West Coast beaches are long, sandy beaches to the north of Cape Town. The wind and surf conditions make these beaches popular for surfing and kite-surfing.

- Milnerton
- Sunset Beach
- Melkbosstrand
- Bloubergstrand
- Silwerstroomstrand Beach is a Blue Flag beach which is safe for swimming in the sea, and also has a tidal pool. There is a public slipway for launching small craft from trailers. The beach extends for three kilometres of sand.
