= Black-backed gull =

Black-backed gull may refer to:

- Kelp gull (Larus dominicanus), of the southern hemisphere, also known as the southern black-backed gull
- Lesser black-backed gull (Larus fuscus), of the northern Atlantic
- Great black-backed gull (Larus marinus), of the northern Atlantic
