= Glen Beach =

Beach on the west coast of Cape Town, South Africa

Coordinates: 33°56′49″S 18°22′41″E

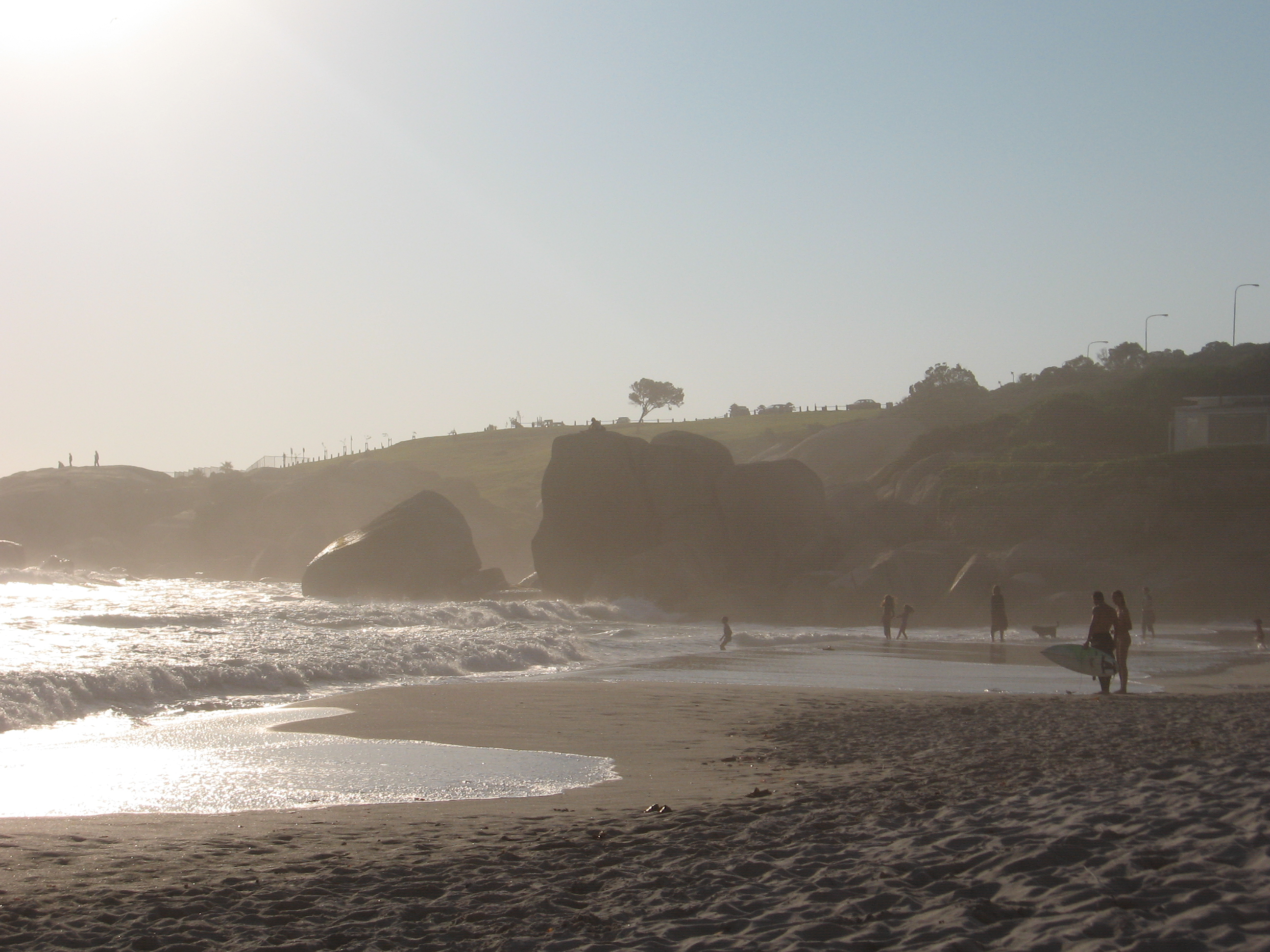
Glen Beach, Cape Town

Glen Beach is located north of Camps Bay Beach in Cape Town, South Africa. The two beaches are divided by a rock outcrop that extends from the land to the shore-line. During the summer months, sand deposits tend to build up at the shore-line, widening both Glen and Camps Bay beaches until the two beaches merge—until winter, when the sand deposits are eroded by winter storms. Glen Beach is well known for its beach-break surfing.

== See also ==
- Beaches of Cape Town
