= List of social nudity places in Africa =

This is a list of social nudity places in Africa. The list includes nude beaches and naturist resorts, where people practice skinny dipping, naked bodysurfing or any other form of nude recreation.

== Indian Ocean ==
=== Réunion Island in the Indian Ocean ===
- Plage de la Souris Chaude (Beach) The naturist beach of Réunion island. It is the only officially tolerated naturist beach on the island.
- Le Dalon Plage, Trois Bassins (nudist hotel gay-friendly).

== South Africa ==
=== Beaches and other natural areas ===
There are no beaches in South Africa where the right to bathe nude is protected. However, the Umhlanga Lagoon and Mpenjati beach are beaches where nudity is accepted and bathers are very unlikely to be prosecuted for simply being naked. Mpenjati beach was approved as a naturist beach by the local town council in charge of the area, however the Public Protector ruled that the proper procedures had not been followed in proclaiming Mpenjati as a naturist beach.

==== Eastern Cape ====
- Lighthouse Beach, Great Fish River (Note: Lighthouse Beach 33°31′27″S 27°06′13″E) between Port Alfred and East London, in 2003 there were plans to make this beach an official nudist beach; the plans never took off.
- Secrets Beach (Note: Secrets Beach 34°01′37″S 25°39′21″E) in Port Elizabeth
- The Striptease River Trail (Note: Striptease River Trail 33°58′52″S 24°01′13″E) at the Tsitsikamma Lodge and Spa. The trail is nudist friendly; the hotel, however, is a textile hotel.

==== KwaZulu-Natal ====
- Mpenjati Nature Reserve, (Note: Mpenjati Nature Reserve 30°58′15.7″S 30°17′11.3″E) near Trafalgar and 11 kilometres (6.8 mi) north of Port Edward, is a beautiful wildlife reserve, administered by Ezemvelo KZN Wildlife, which has a popular nudist beach. Application was made to the Hibiscus Coast Local Municipality to approve its use as an official nudist beach. On 28 October 2014, at their October 2014 monthly council meeting the Hibiscus Coast Local Municipality approved beach as an official naturist beach. In November 2017 the Public Protector declared that the proclamation of the beach as a nudist beach by the Municipality did not follow proper procedures and prescripts. The nudist section of the beach is about 200 metres (220 yd) north of the Mpenjati River mouth, and is clearly signposted.

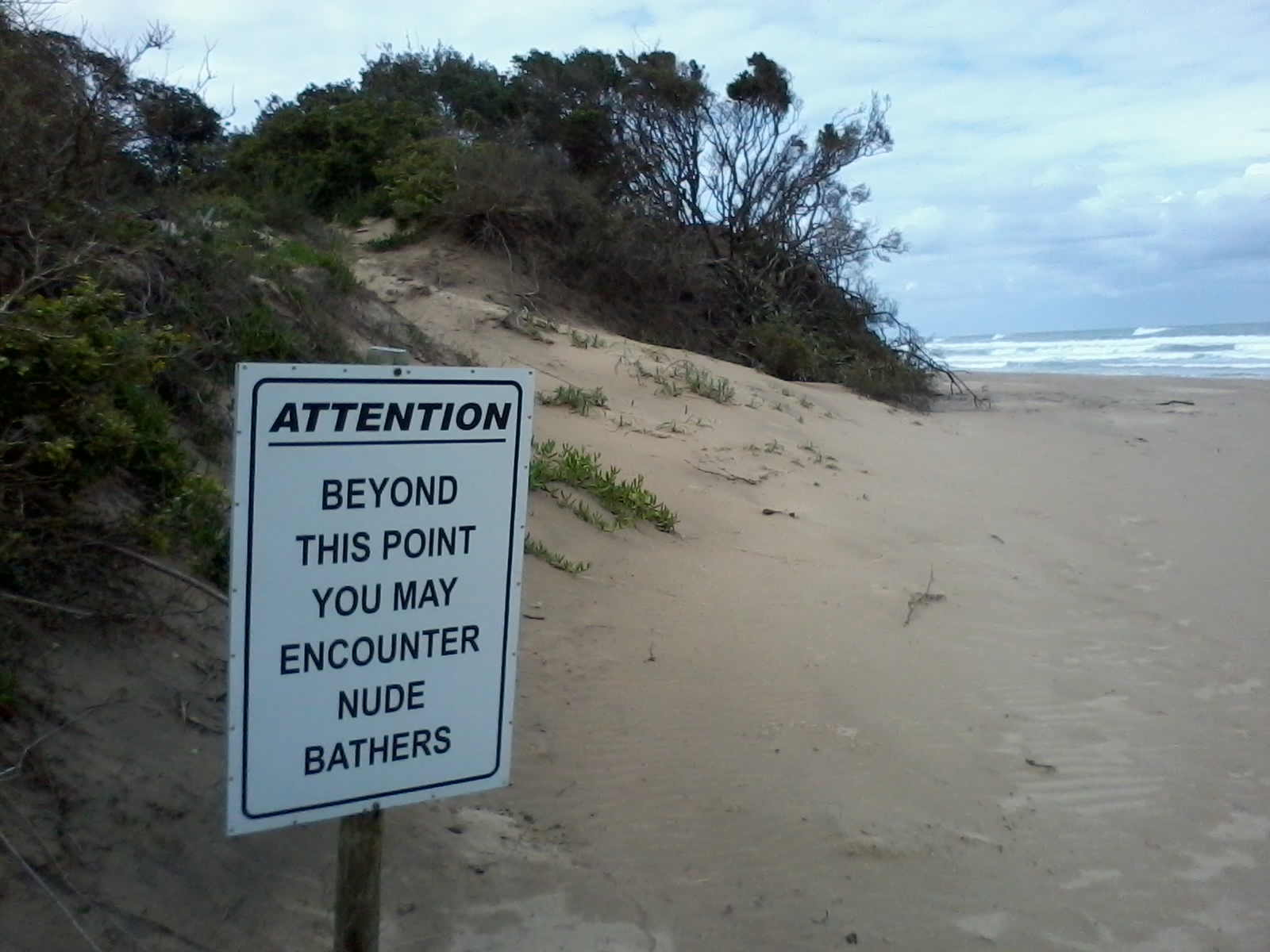
Signpost at Mpenjati Naturist Beach advising people that they may see naked people.

==== Western Cape ====
- Sandy Bay (Note: Sandy Bay 34°1′24″S 18°19′51″E) in Cape Town is the best-known nude beach in South Africa. It is isolated by cliffs, and has no vehicle access.

=== Resorts ===
==== Gauteng ====
- Sun Eden (Note: Sun Eden 25°29′36″S 28°24′20″E) and Owlsnest Deluxe Naturist Chalet in the Bush (Note: OwlsNest Deluxe Naturist Chalet 25°29′36″S 28°24′20″E) are near Pretoria.
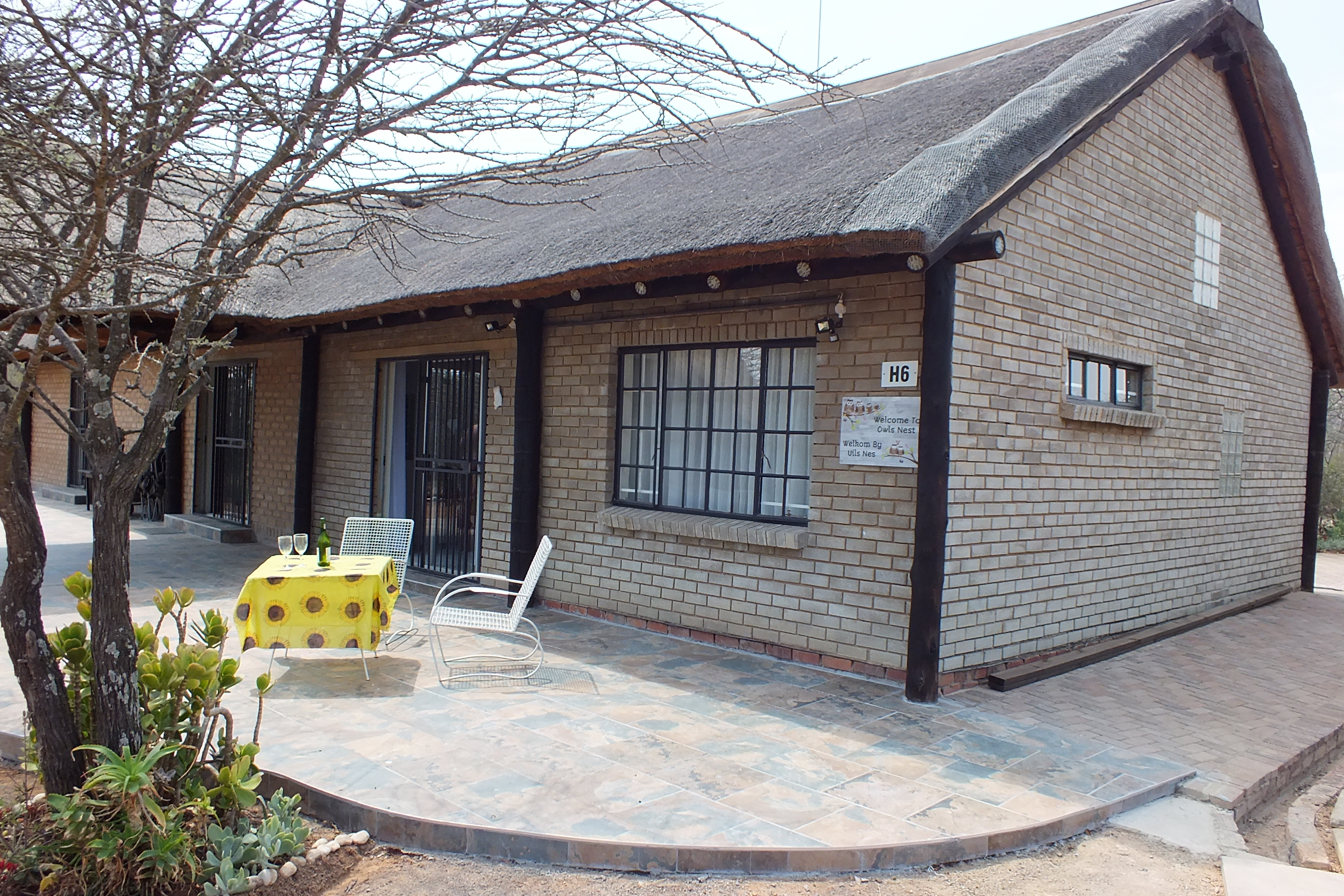
  Owlsnest Deluxe Naturist Chalet in the Bush

==== KwaZulu-Natal ====
- Hooting Owl (Note: Hooting Owl 30°55′55″S 30°18′03″E) is a B&B south of Margate about 1 km from the Indian Ocean coast. "The whole guest house property can also be booked as a clothing optional retreat for Naturist/Nudist groups on request."

==== North West Province ====
- Harmony Nature Farm (Note: Harmony Nature Farm 25°50′11″S 27°19′15″E) is nestled on the cliffs of the Magaliesberg mountains.
- Kiepersolkloof (Note: Kiepersolkloof 25°41′43″S 26°47′22″E) is a private nature reserve near Rustenburg.
- Voëlkop (Note: Voëlkop 25°37′14″S 27°38′31″E) is a men-only gay nude resort in Makolokwe between Pretoria and Rustenburg.

==== Western Cape ====
- Bare Necessities (Note: Bare Necessities 34°04′39″S 20°41′13″E) in Suurbraak.
- Port Nature (Note: Port Nature 31°01′42″S 18°20′44″E) in Sandy Bay.
- Sun Kissed Villa (Note: Sun Kissed Villa 34°02′19″S 18°20′51″E) in Hout Bay.
