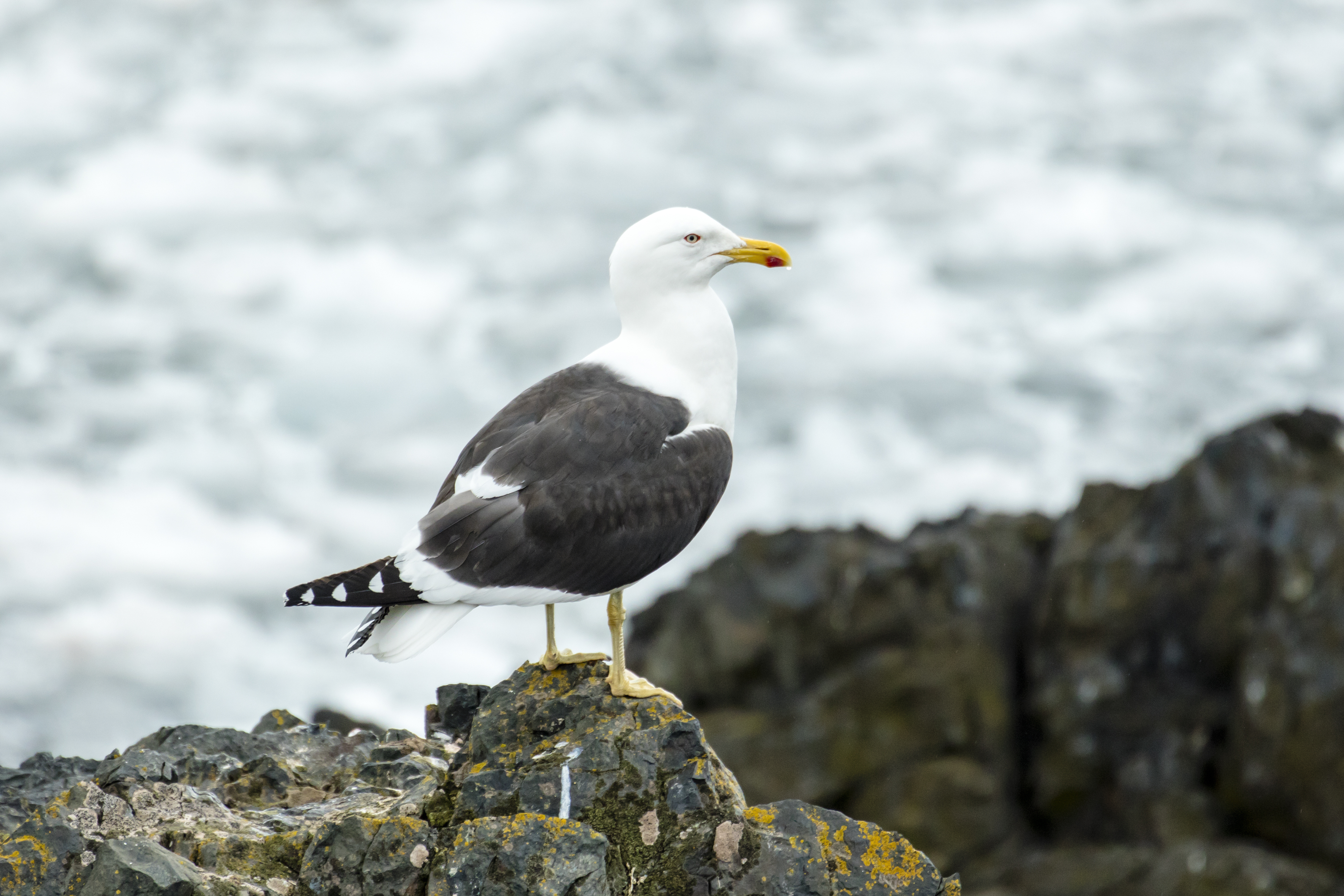
- Adult in Livingston Island, South Shetland Islands

Conservation status
- Least Concern (IUCN 3.1)

Scientific classification
- Kingdom: Animalia
- Phylum: Chordata
- Class: Aves
- Order: Charadriiformes
- Family: Laridae
- Genus: Larus
- Species: L. dominicanus

Binomial name
- Larus dominicanus Lichtenstein, MHC, 1823

= Kelp gull =

Species of bird

The kelp gull (Larus dominicanus), also known as the Dominican gull, is a gull that breeds on coasts and islands through much of the Southern Hemisphere. The nominate L. d. dominicanus is the subspecies found around South America, parts of Australia (where it overlaps with the Pacific gull), and New Zealand (where it is known as the black-backed gull, the southern black-backed gull, mollyhawk – particularly the juveniles, or by its Māori name karoro). L. d. vetula (known as the Cape gull) is a subspecies occurring around Southern Africa.

The specific name comes from the Dominican Order of friars, who wear black and white habits.

== Description ==
The kelp gull superficially resembles two gulls from further north in the Atlantic Ocean, the lesser black-backed gull and the great black-backed gull, and is intermediate in size between these two species. This species ranges from 54 to 65 cm (21 to 26 in) in total length, from 128 to 142 cm (50 to 56 in) in wingspan and from 540 to 1,390 g (1.19 to 3.06 lb) in weight. Adult males and females weigh on average 1,000 g (2.2 lb) and 900 g (2.0 lb) respectively. Among standard measurements, the wing chord is 37.3 to 44.8 cm (14.7 to 17.6 in), the bill is 4.4 to 5.9 cm (1.7 to 2.3 in) and the tarsus is 5.3 to 7.5 cm (2.1 to 3.0 in). The adult kelp gull has black upper parts and wings. The head, underparts, tail, and the small "mirrors" at the wing tips are white. The bill is yellow with a red spot, and the legs are greenish-yellow (brighter and yellower when breeding, duller and greener when not breeding). The call is a strident ki-och. Juveniles have dull legs, a black bill, a dark band in the tail, and an overall grey-brown plumage densely edged whitish, but they rapidly get a pale base to the bill and largely white head and underparts. They take three or four years to reach maturity.

== Subspecies ==
There are five subspecies of kelp gull. The African subspecies L. d. vetula is sometimes split as the Cape gull, L. vetula. It has a more angular head and a smaller shorter bill. The adult has a dark eye, whereas the nominate kelp gull usually has a pale eye. Young Cape gulls have almost identical plumage to similarly aged kelp gulls.

Image	Subspecies	Distribution
	L. d. dominicanus, (Lichtenstein, 1823)	South America, Falklands, South Georgia, Australia & New Zealand
	L. d. vetula, (Bruch, 1853)	Southern Africa
	L. d. judithae, (Jiguet, 2002)	subantarctic islands in the Indian Ocean
	L. d. melisandae, (Jiguet, 2002)	southern & southwestern Madagascar
	L. d. austrinus, (Fleming, 1924)	Antarctica & Antarctic islands

The kelp gull is a rare vagrant to the United States, with the first record in 1989 on Chandeleur Islands in Louisiana. They have interbred with American herring gull on these islands, leading to intermediate birds that may backcross to one another. After Hurricane Katrina in 2005, breeding populations of the two species and their hybrids were displaced from the island, though putative hybrids have been reported elsewhere and may be the result of other offshore colonies. In 2025, a kelp gull was found living on the roof of a warehouse in Milwaukee, Wisconsin. As of April 2026, this bird has apparently returned to the same site.

== Behaviour ==
Kelp gulls are omnivores like most Larus gulls, and they will scavenge as well as seek suitable small prey. They gather on landfills and a sharp increase in population is therefore considered as an indicator for a degraded environment. Kelp gulls have been observed feeding on living right whales since at least 1996. The kelp gull uses its powerful beak to peck down centimetres into the skin and blubber, often leaving the whales with large open sores, some of which have been observed to be half a meter in diameter. This predatory behavior has been documented in Argentinian waters. At rocky sites along the Southern African coast, such as at Boulders Beach in Cape Town, kelp gulls (Larus dominicanus vetula) can be seen picking up shellfish and repeatedly flying up several meters and dropping them onto the rocks below in order to break them open. They have also been reported pecking the eyes out of seal pups on the coast of Namibia before attacking the blind seals in a group.

The nest is a shallow depression on the ground lined with vegetation and feathers. The female usually lays 2 or 3 eggs. Both parents feed the young birds.

== Gallery ==
Kelp gull

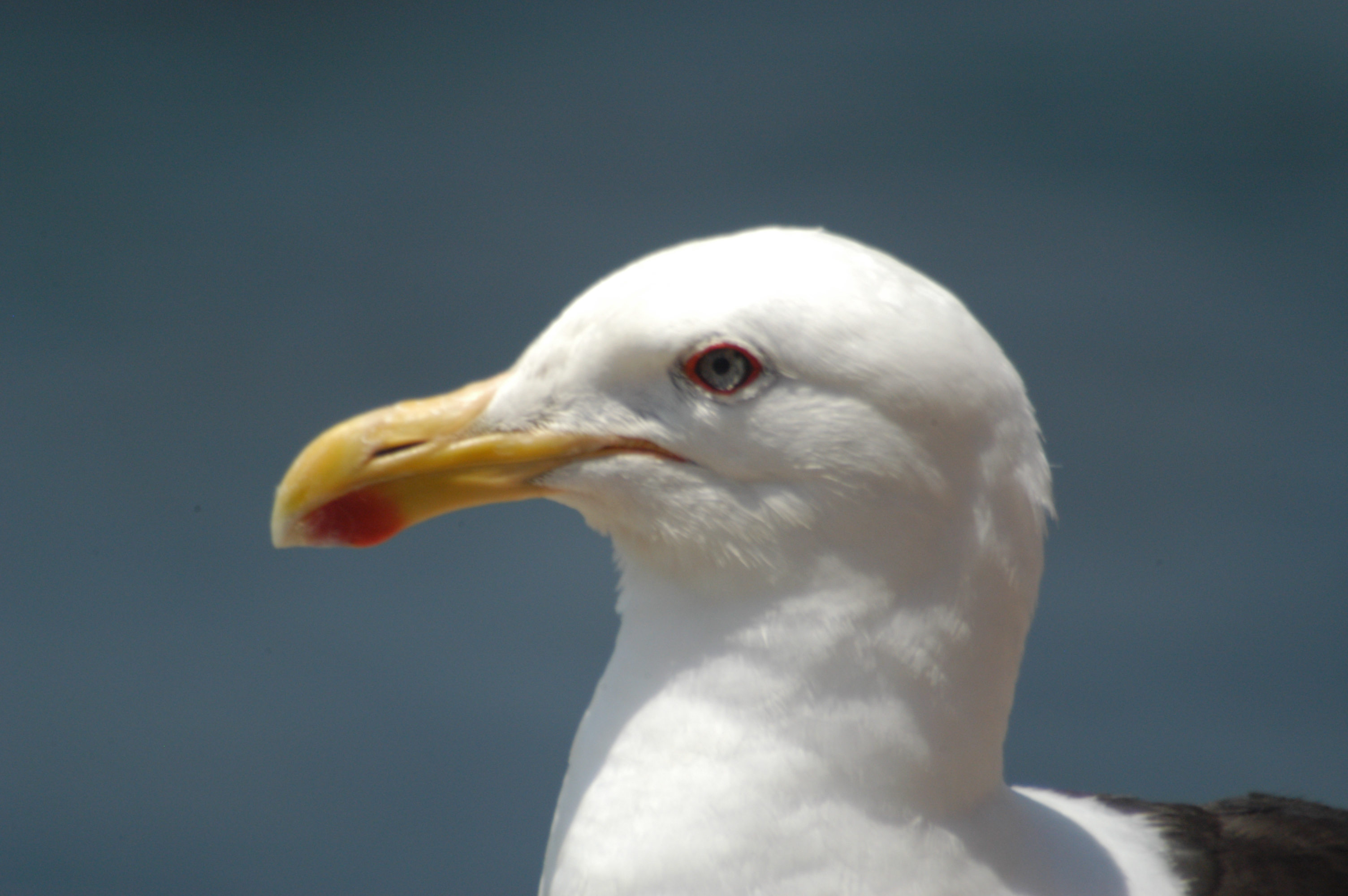
At Concón, Chile

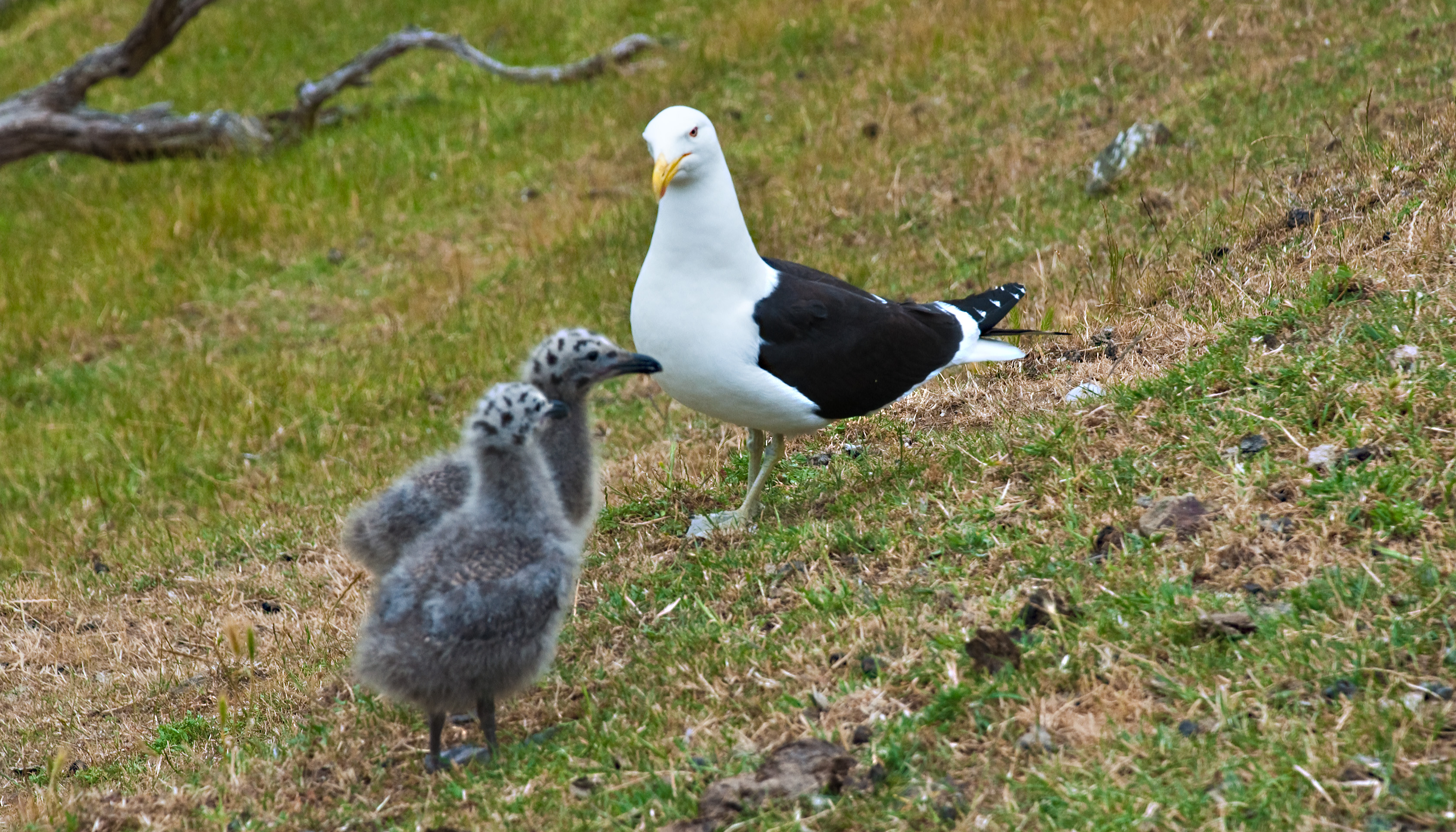
Adult and two chicks in New Zealand

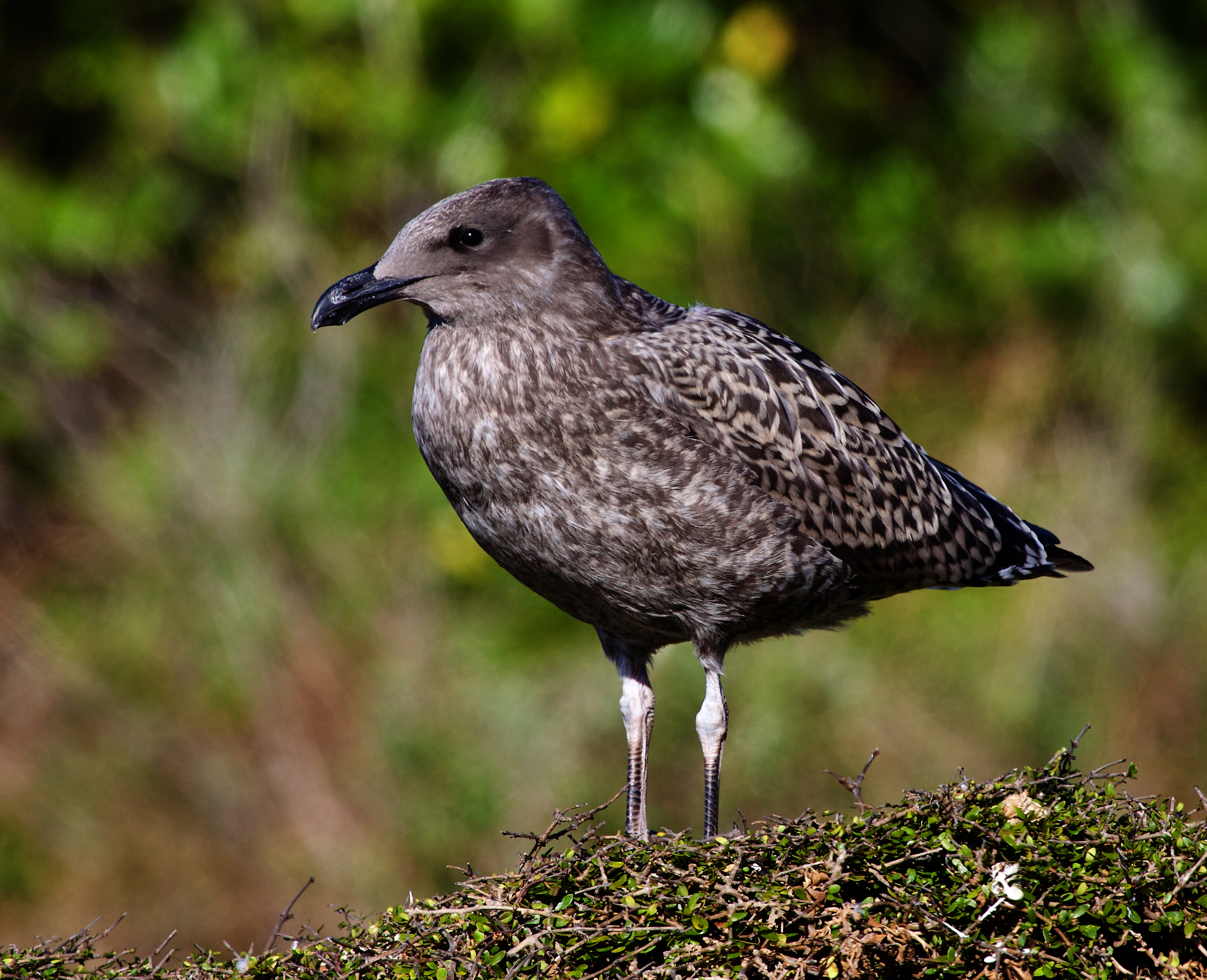
Juvenile in New Zealand

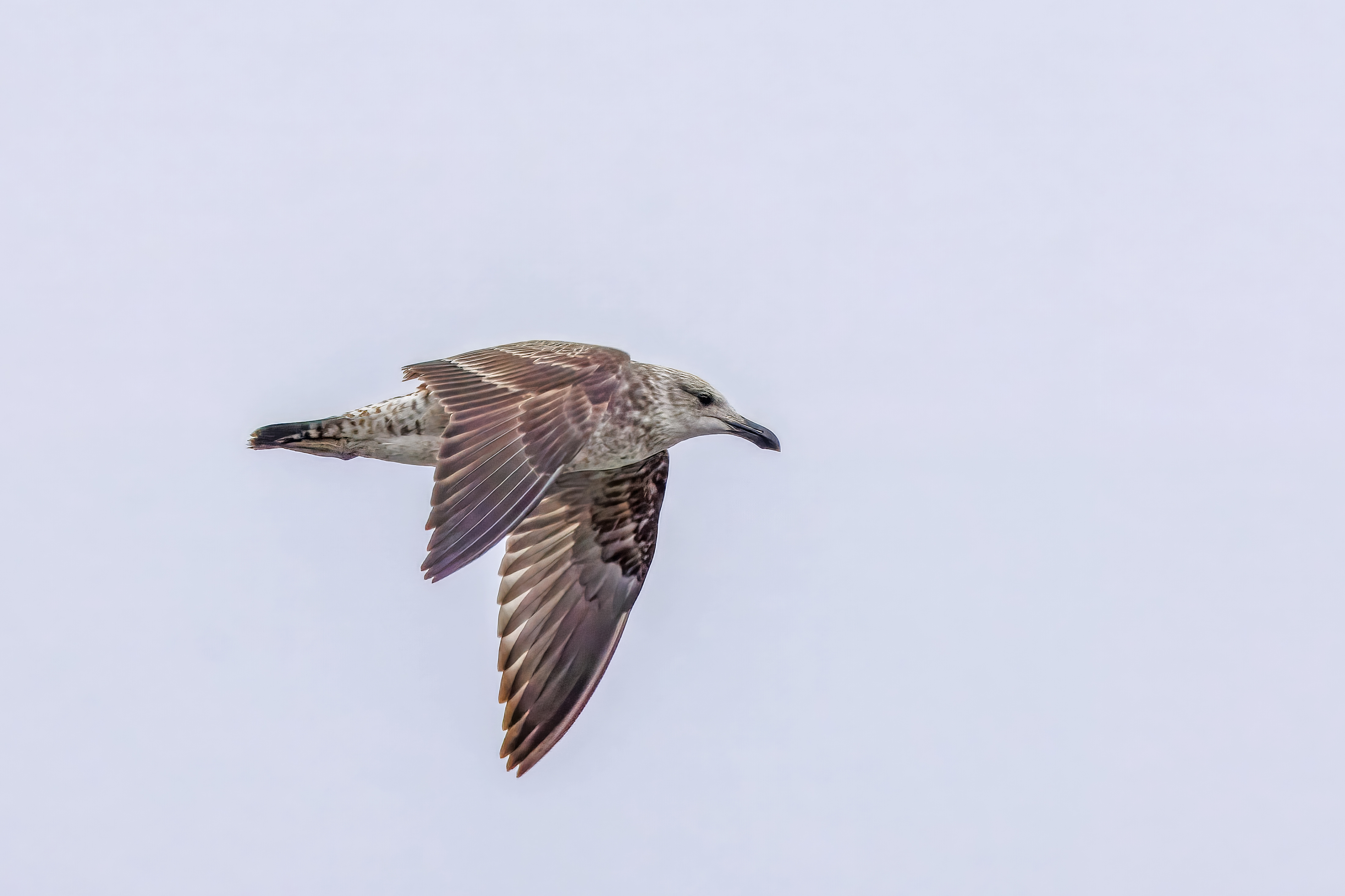
First winter

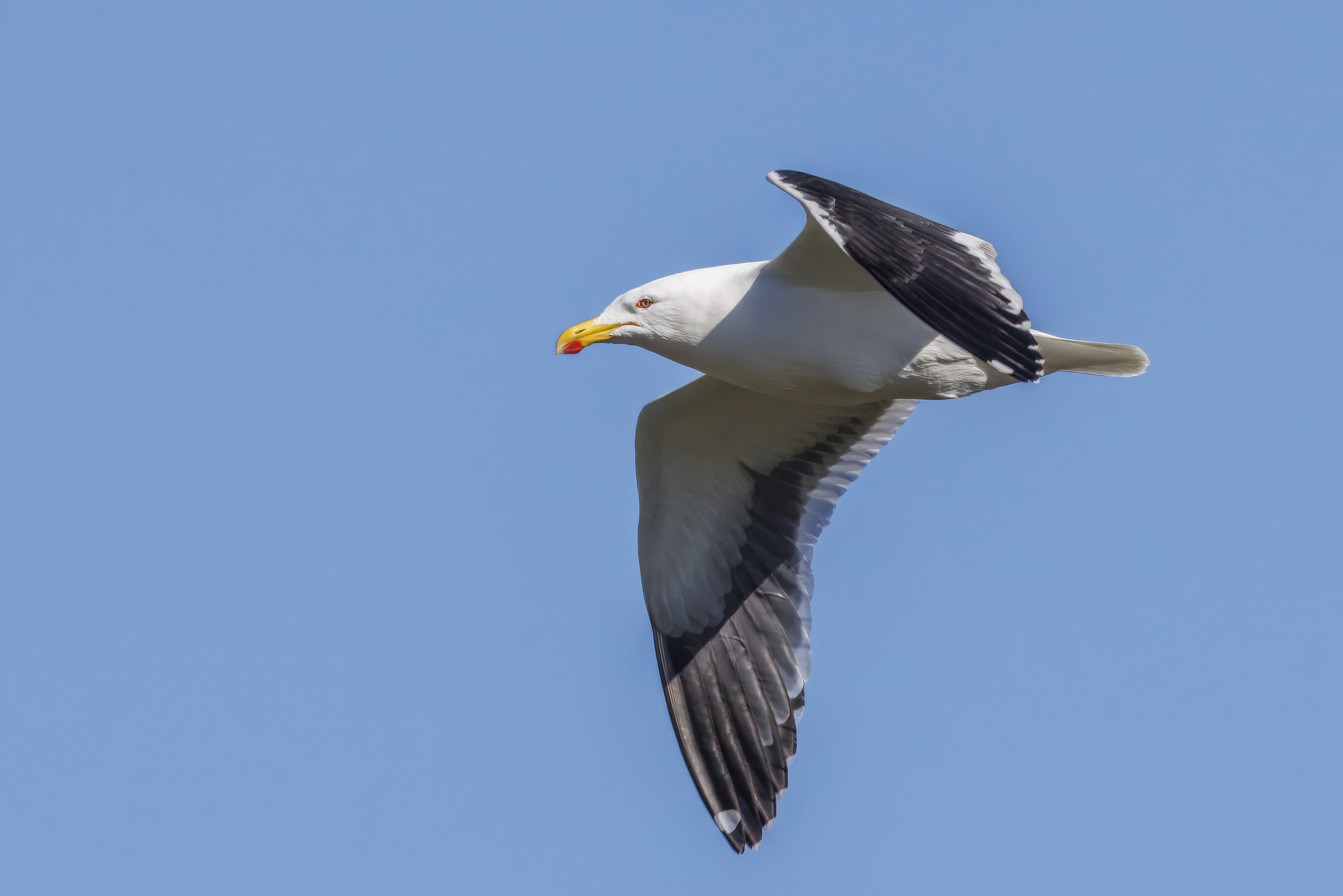
adult

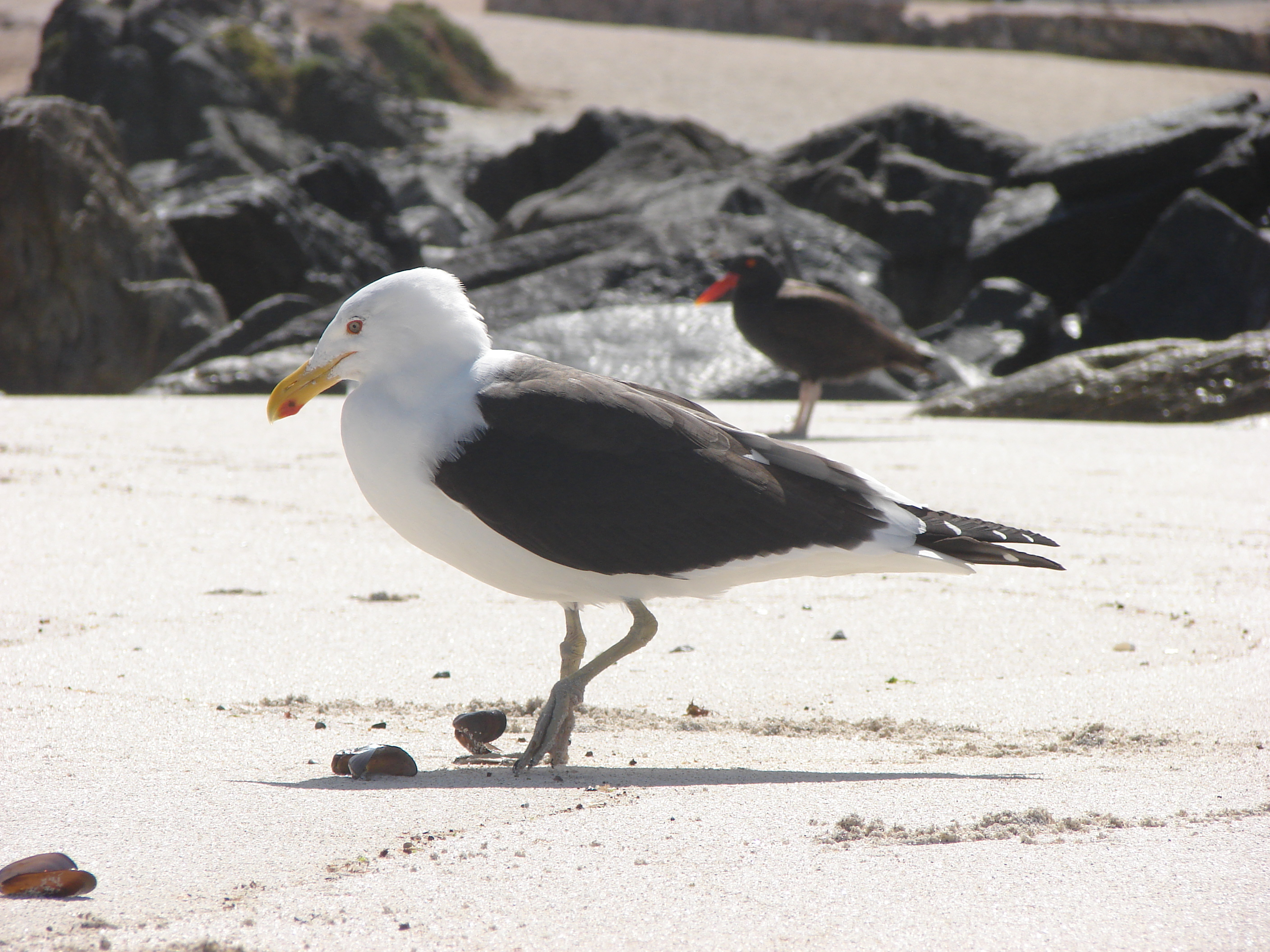
L. d. dominicanus stealing a meal of shellfish from blackish oystercatchers in Bahía Inglesa, Chile

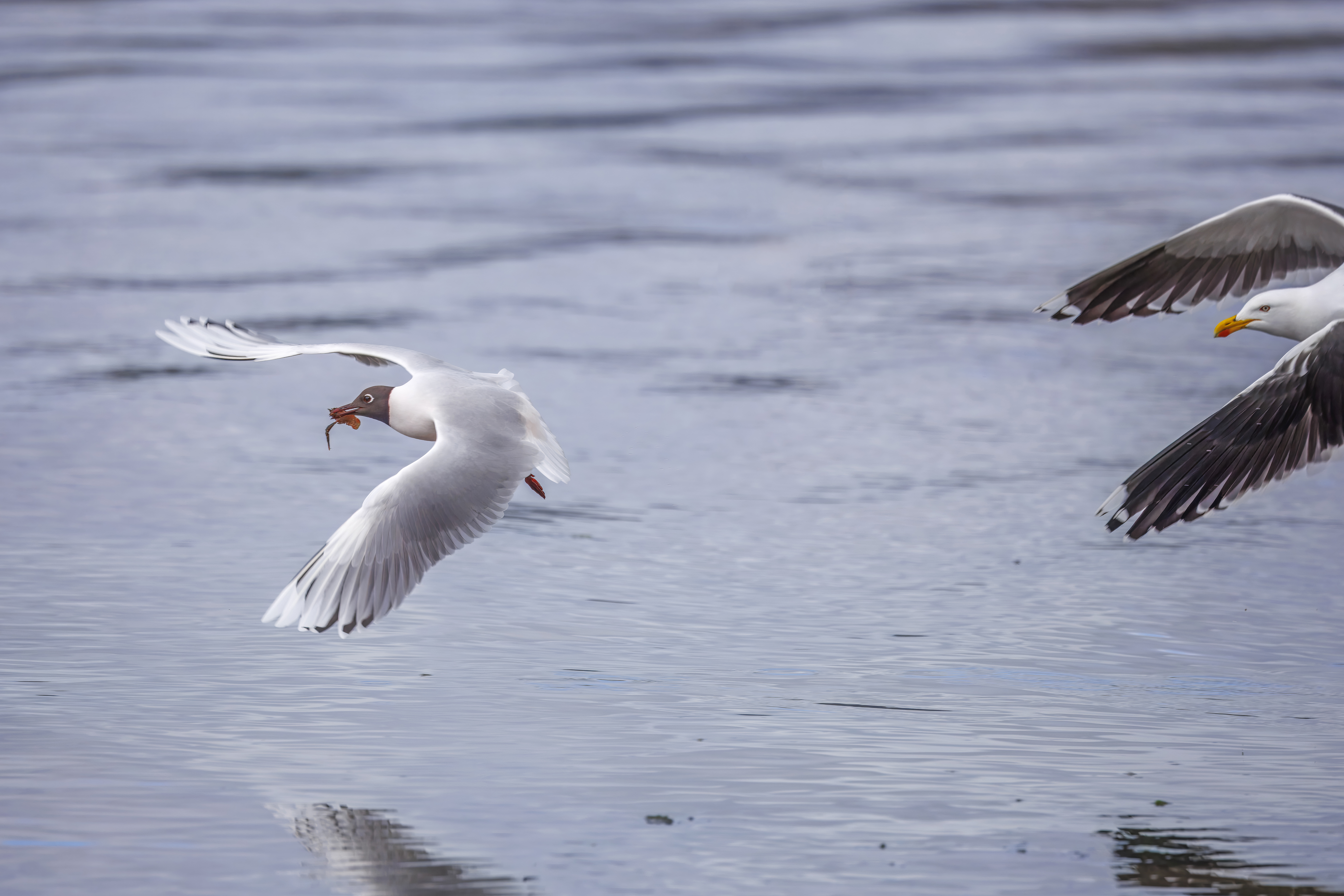
chasing a brown-hooded gull (Chroicocephalus maculipennis) (with Grimothea monodon)

== Cape gull (Larus dominicanus vetula or Larus vetula) ==
Cape gull

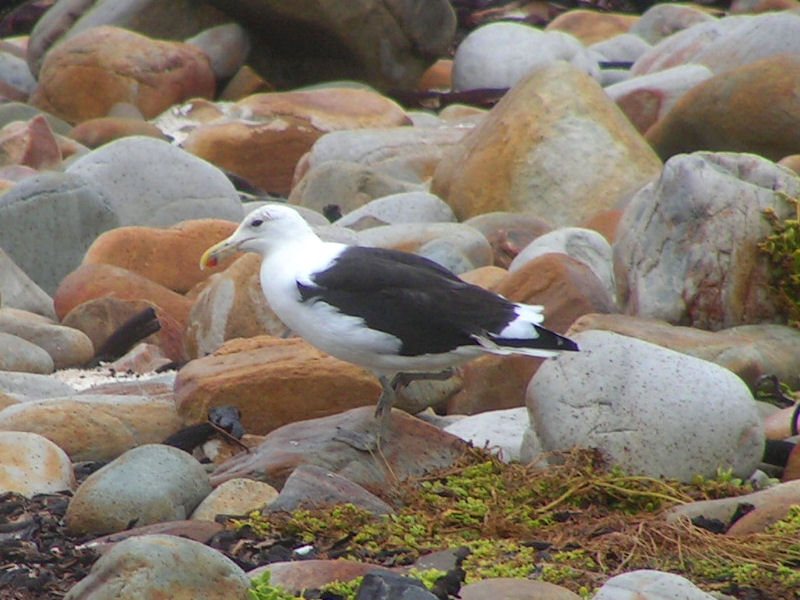
Cape gull (L. d. vetula), Boulders Beach, South Africa

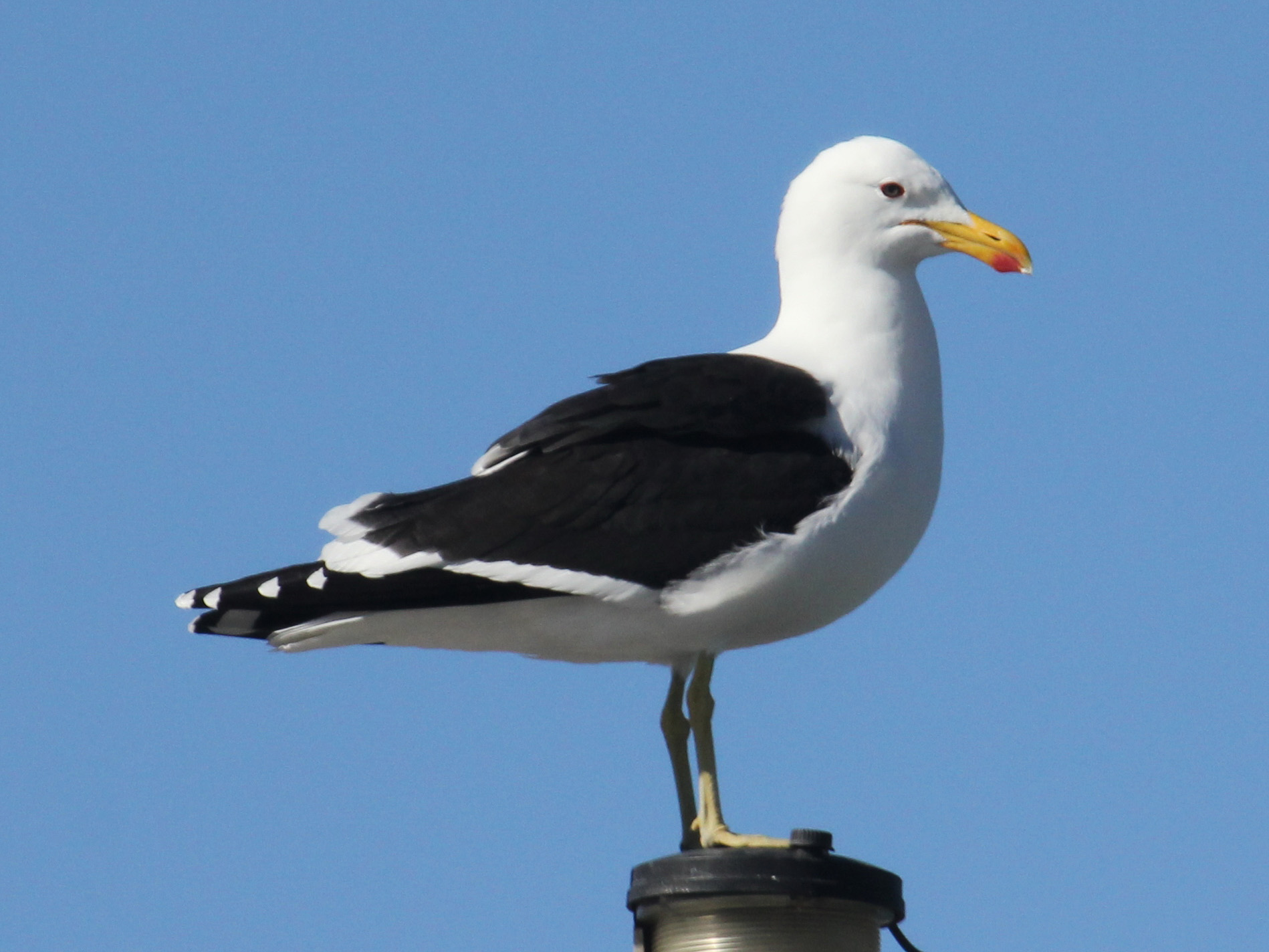
Hout Bay, South Africa

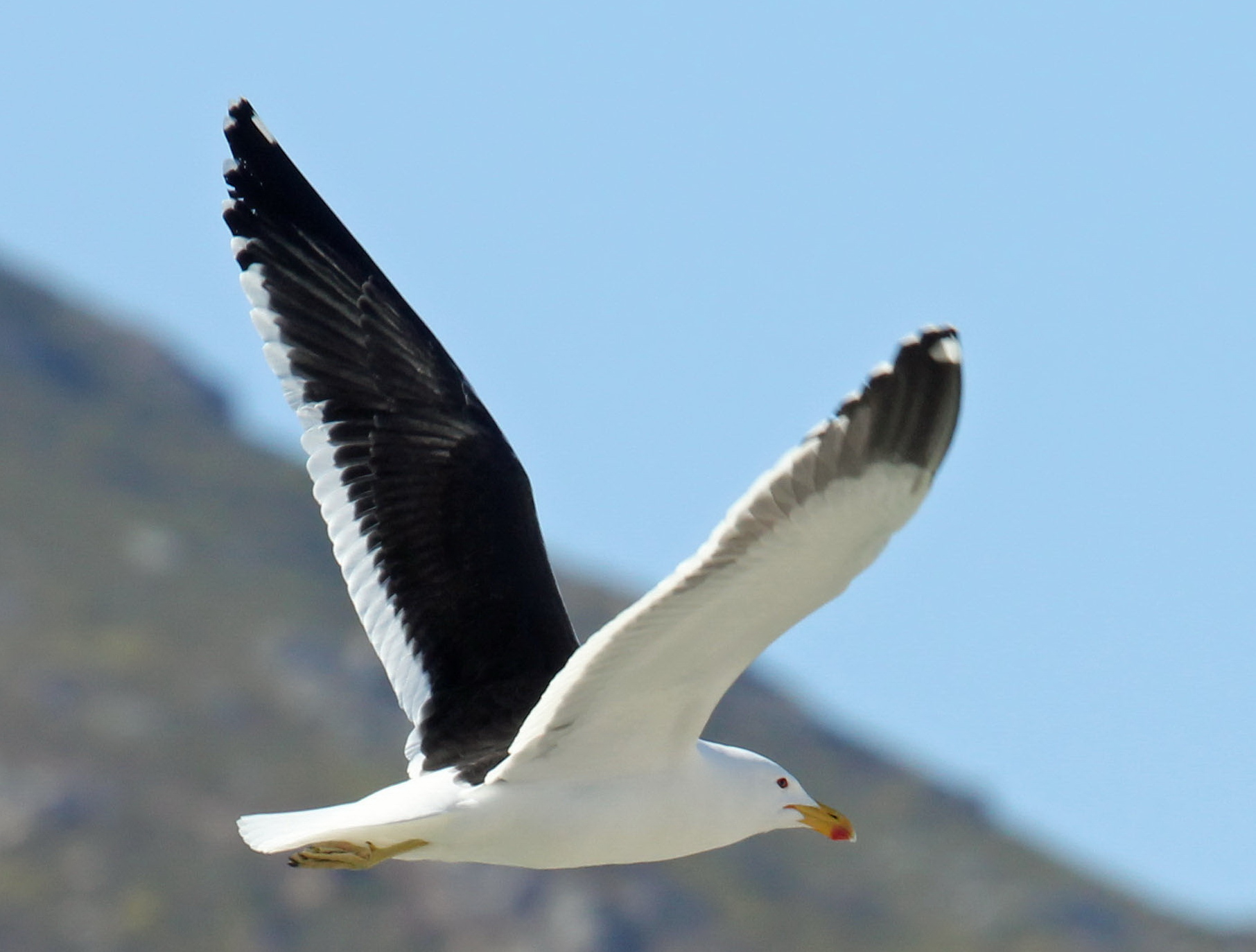
Hout Bay, South Africa

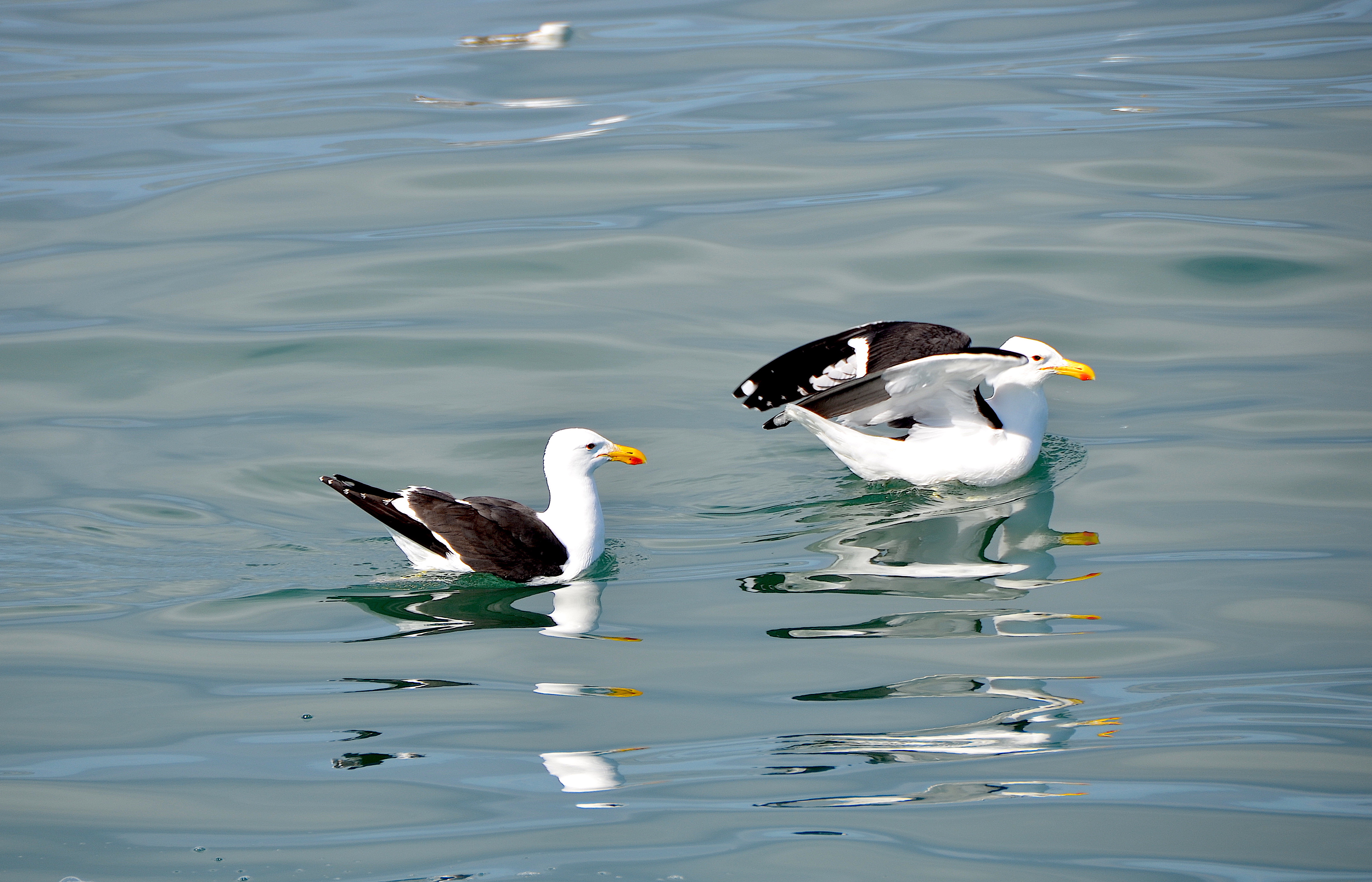
Cape gulls searching for food in South Africa

The Cape gull differs from other forms of kelp gulls by its darker iris and larger body and bill size. The Southern African population is estimated to include 11,000 breeding pairs, and is expanding.
