= Sandy Bay, Cape Town =

Beach in Cape Town, South Africa

Coordinates: 34°1′24″S 18°19′51″E

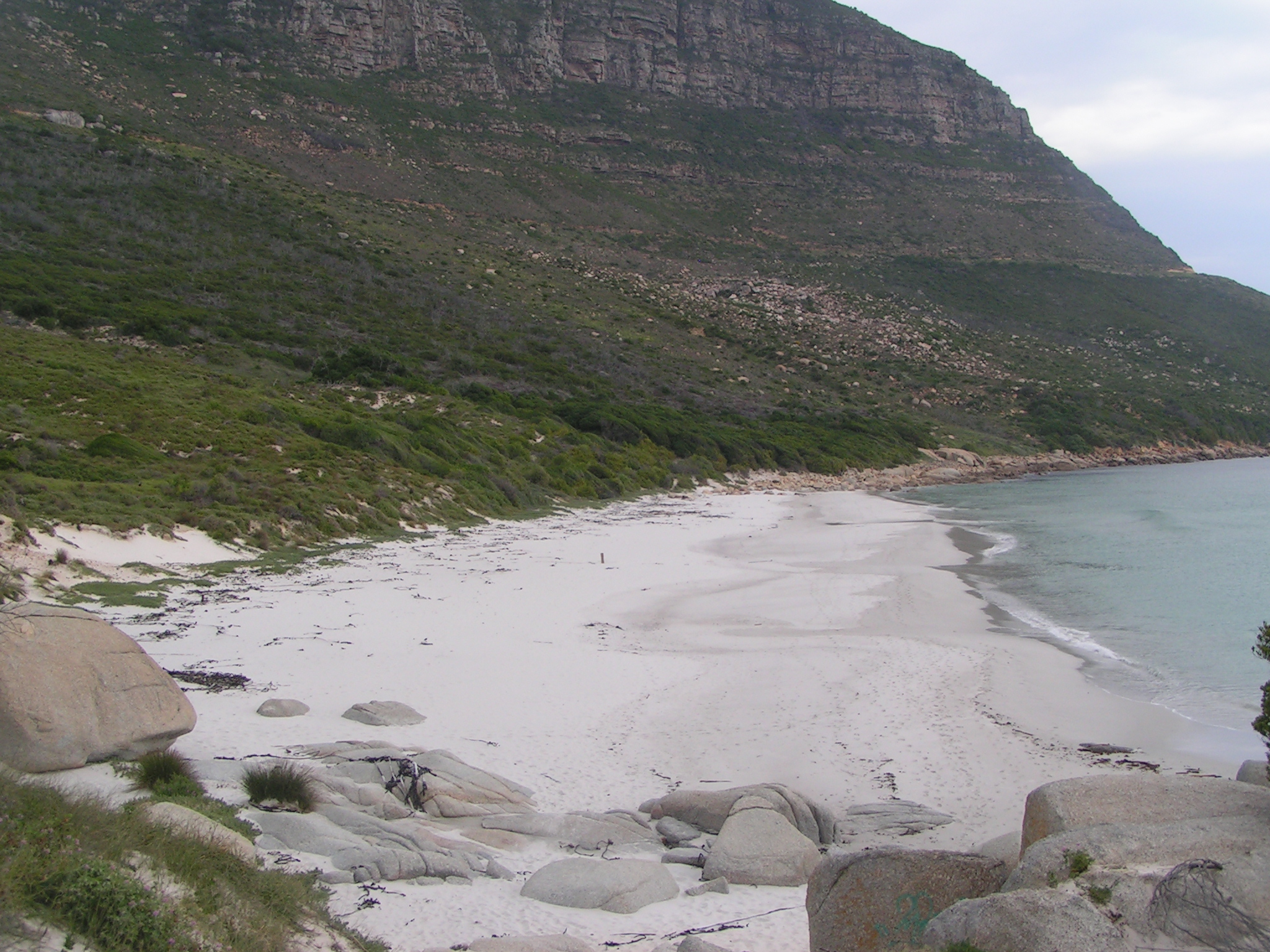
Sandy Bay, Cape Town

Sandy Bay is an unofficial nudist beach just south of Llandudno. It is on the west side of the Karbonkelberg, and cannot be seen from the main road to Hout Bay, which turns inland above Llandudno.

Sandy Bay is not easily accessible. There are two ways to get the beach, one follow the path from the car park at the southern end of Llandudno or take a 20-minute walk from the car park at the northern end of Hout Bay. The car parks are rather small and parking is often insufficient – the only solution is getting there early or having to walk a little further.

Because of its difficulty to reach the beach and hidden location, Sandy Bay has been enjoyed by naturists for years.

== See also ==
- List of social nudity places in Africa

== Notes and references ==
- John Bradley; Liz Bradley; Victoria Fine; Jon Vidar (2011). Cape Town: Winelands & the Garden Route. Modern Overland. pp. 78–. ISBN 978-1-60987-122-2.
- Armstrong, Kate (2006). South Africa, Lesotho & Swaziland. Lonely Planet. ISBN 978-1-74059-970-2.
- Walne, Helen (7 December 2011). "Sandy Bay: the naked truth". Cape Argus. Archived from the original on 2014-02-08.
- Cooper, Davina (2011). "Theorising Nudist Equality: An Encounter Between Political Fantasy and Public Appearance" (PDF). Antipode. 43 (2): 326–357. doi:10.1111/j.1467-8330.2010.00833.x. ISSN 0066-4812.
