= Boulders Beach =

Beach in Cape Town, South Africa

Coordinates: 34.197°S 18.451°E

- Beach
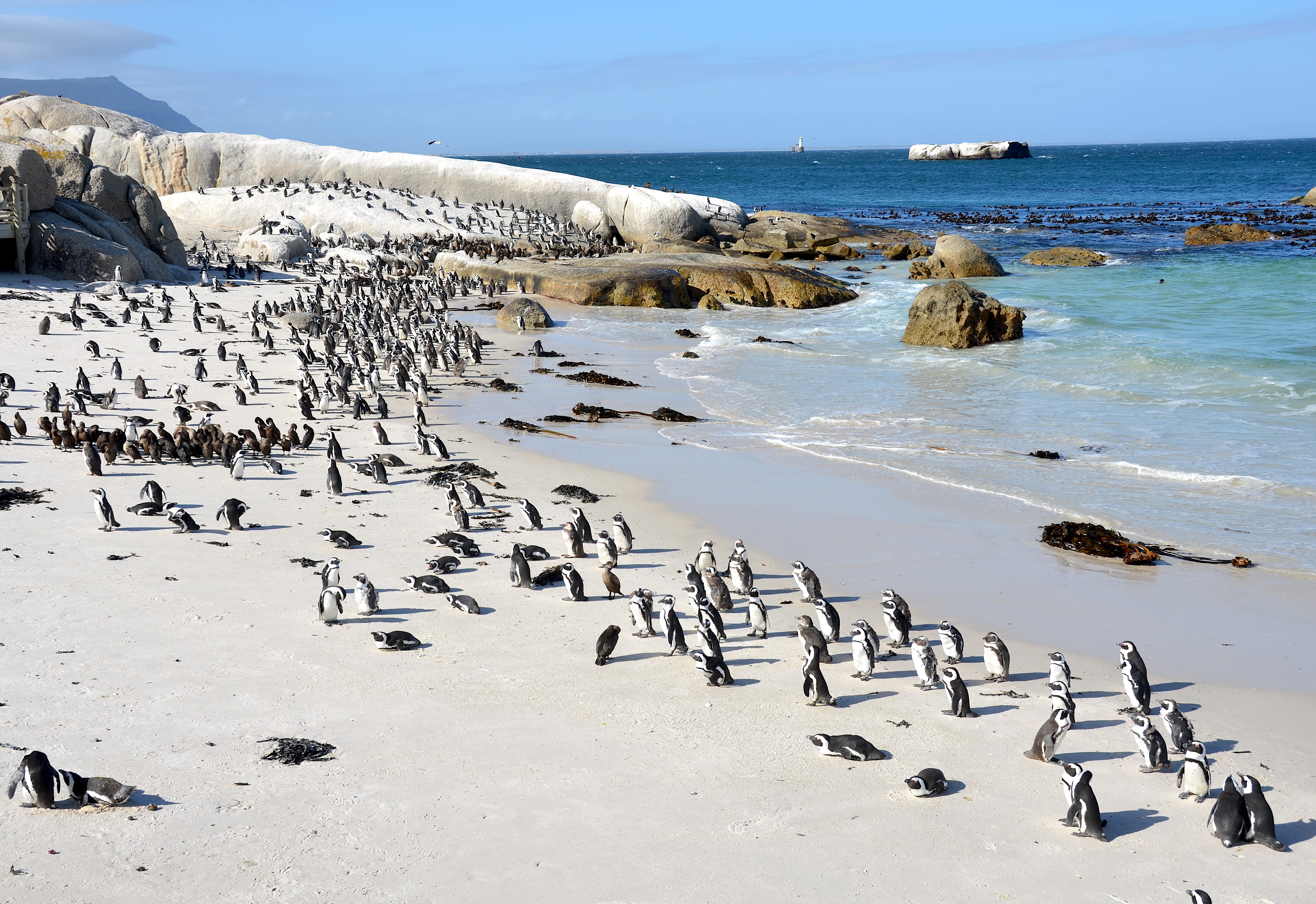
- African penguins (Spheniscus demersus) at Boulders Beach

- Location within South Africa
- Coordinates
- Location: Cape Peninsula, Simon's Town, Western Cape
- Patrolled by: Table Mountain National Park
- Access: Kleintuin Road, Simon's Town

Boulders Beach is a sheltered beach made up of inlets between granite boulders, from which the name originated. It is located on the eastern side of the Cape Peninsula, in Simon's Town, in the southern region of Cape Town, South Africa. It is also commonly known as Boulders Bay.

The beach is a popular tourist spot because of a colony of the endemic and critically endangered African penguins (Spheniscus demersus) which settled there in 1982. Boulders Beach forms part of the Table Mountain National Park.

== Penguins ==
Although set in a residential area, it is one of the few sites where African penguins can be observed at close range, wandering freely in a protected natural environment. From just two breeding pairs in 1982, the penguin colony has grown to about 3000 birds in recent years. This is partly due to the prohibition of commercial pelagic trawling in False Bay, which has increased the supply of sardines and anchovies, which form part of the penguins' diet, as well as the help from former SANDF naval officer, Van the Penguin Man.

== Beaches ==
Bordered mainly by indigenous bush above the high-water mark on the one side, and the clear water of False Bay on the other, the area comprises several small sheltered bays, partially enclosed by granite boulders that are 540 million years old. The most popular recreational spot is Boulders Beach, but the penguins are best viewed from Foxy Beach, where newly constructed boardwalks take visitors to within a few metres of the birds. It is also a famous swimming beach, although people are restricted to beaches adjacent to the penguin colony.

In 2024, Boulders was ranked as the second best beach in the world in the Golden Beach Awards, for its combination of natural beauty and African penguins. In 2025, Boulders was ranked the 12th best beach in the world by The World’s Best, for its warm water, penguins, safe swimming spots, and combination of leisure and wildlife conservation.

== Gallery ==
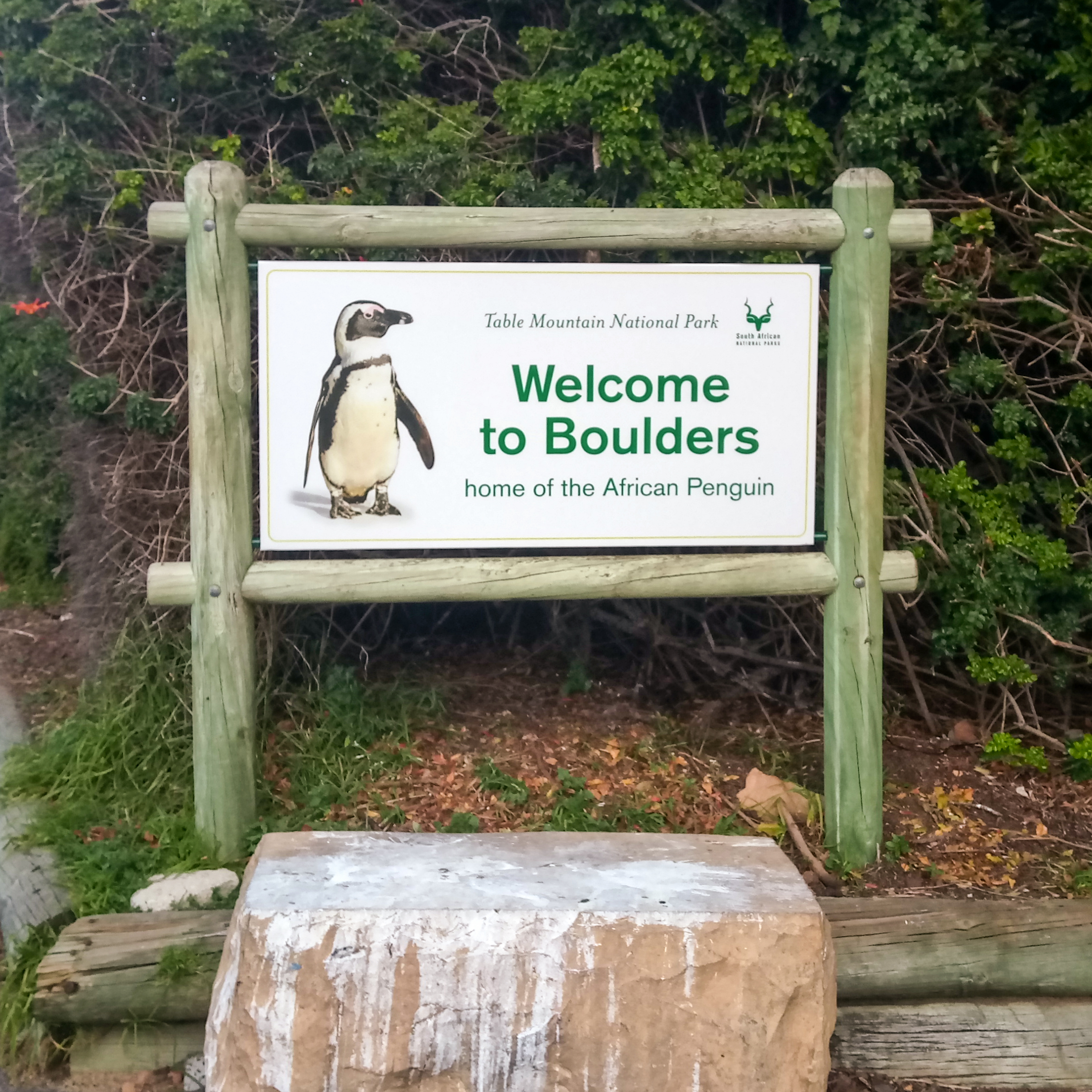
Welcome to Boulders

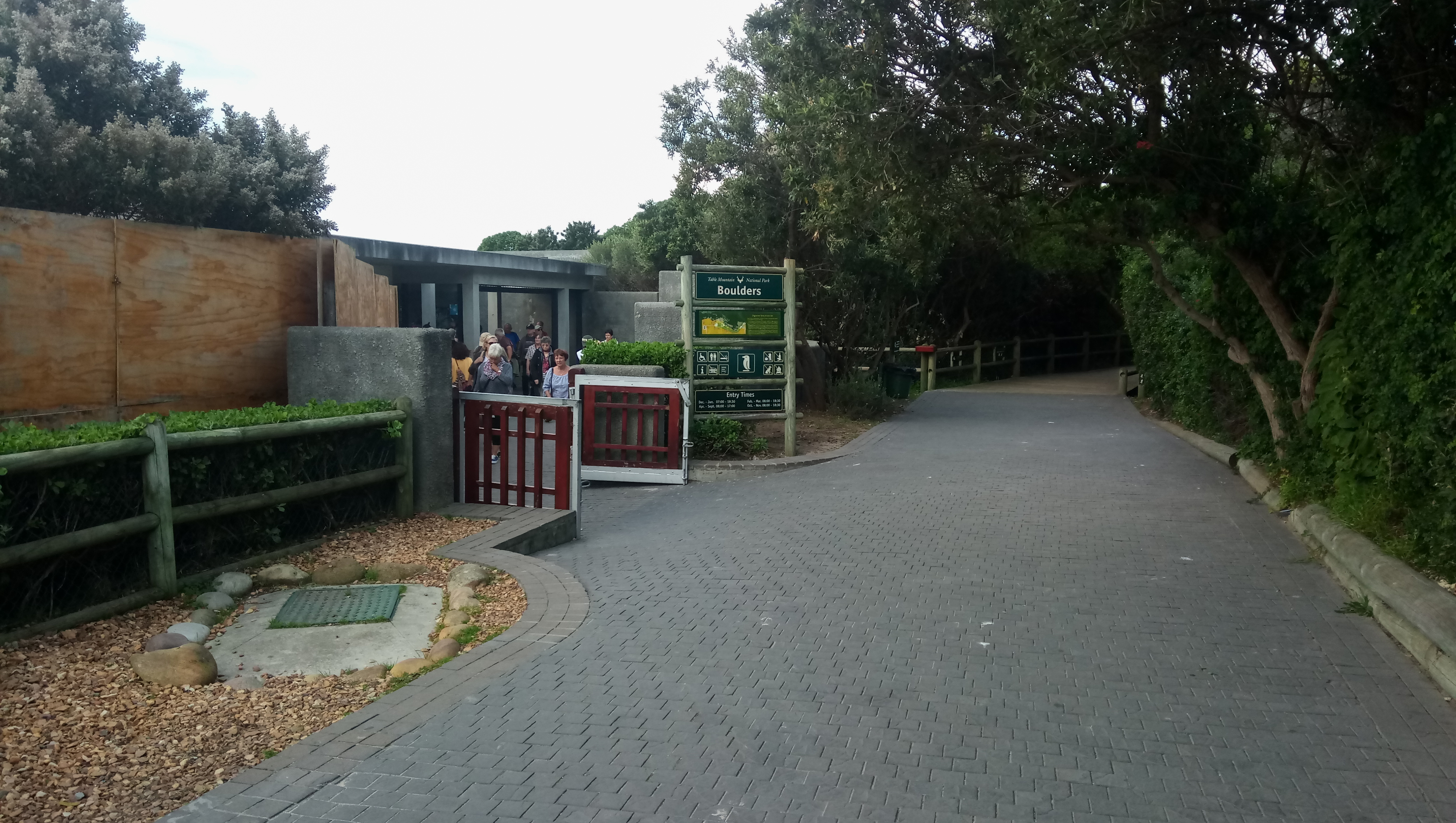
Entrance, Kleintuin Road, Simon's Town

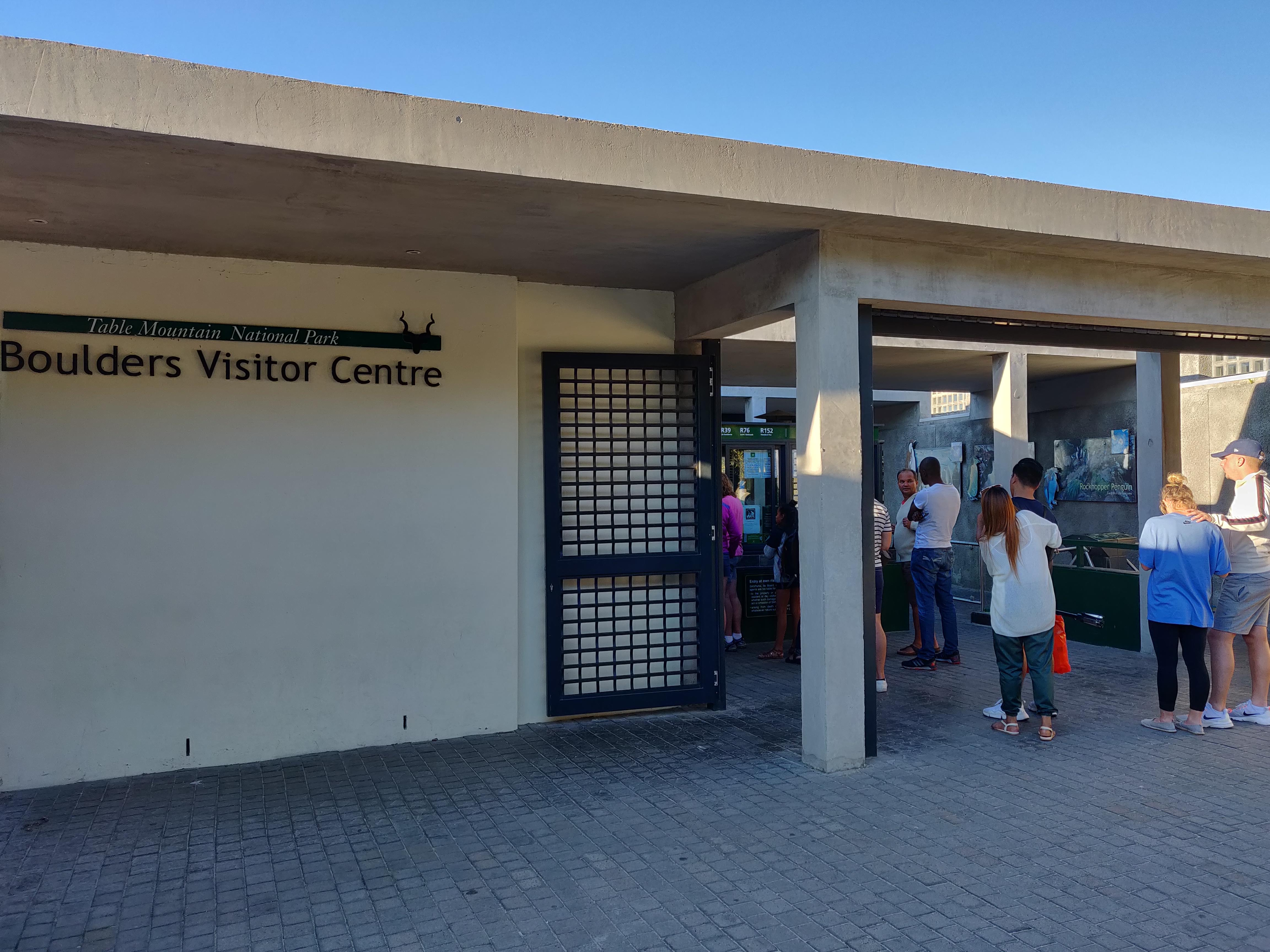
Boulders Beach Visitor Centre

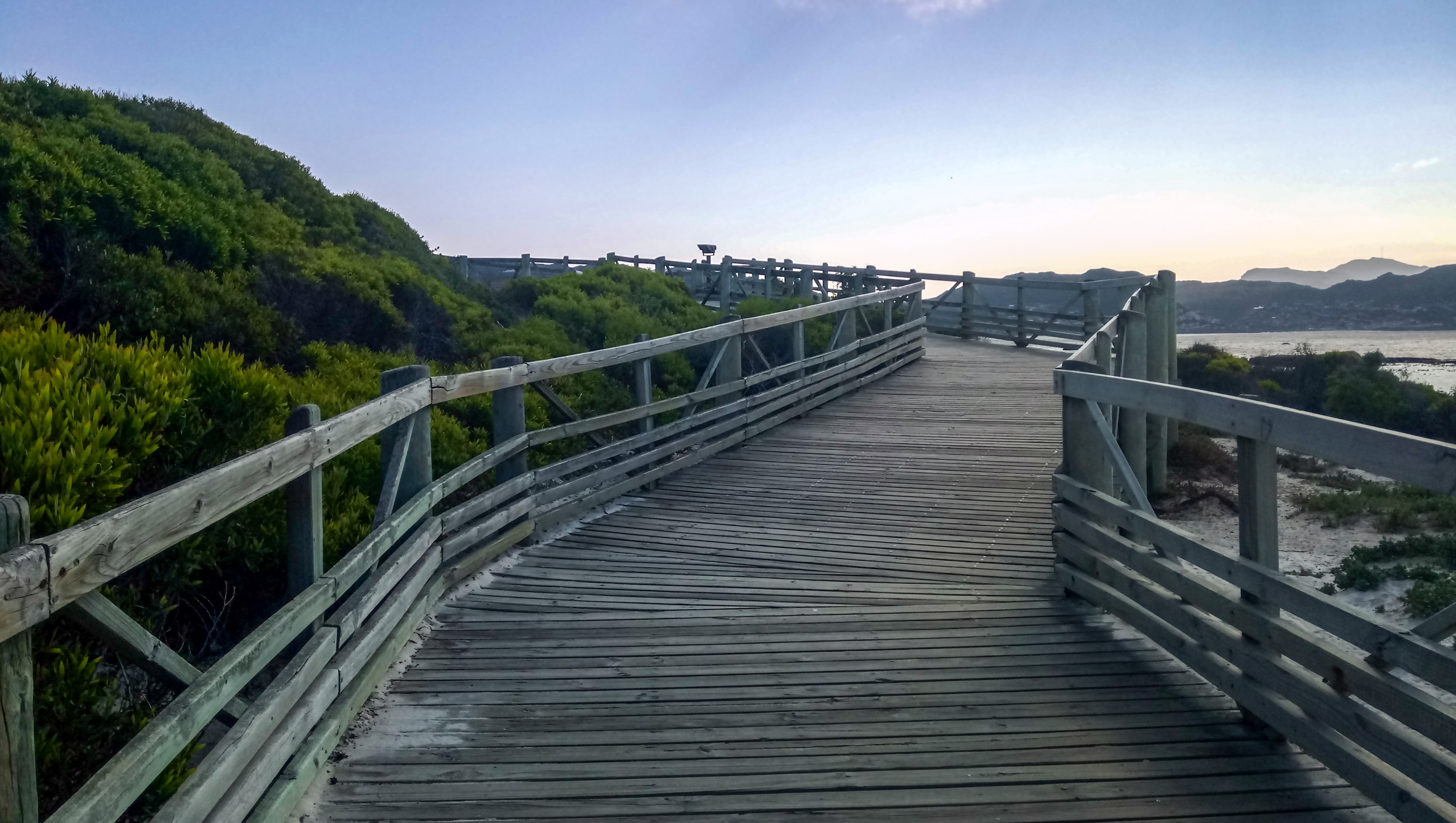
Pathway

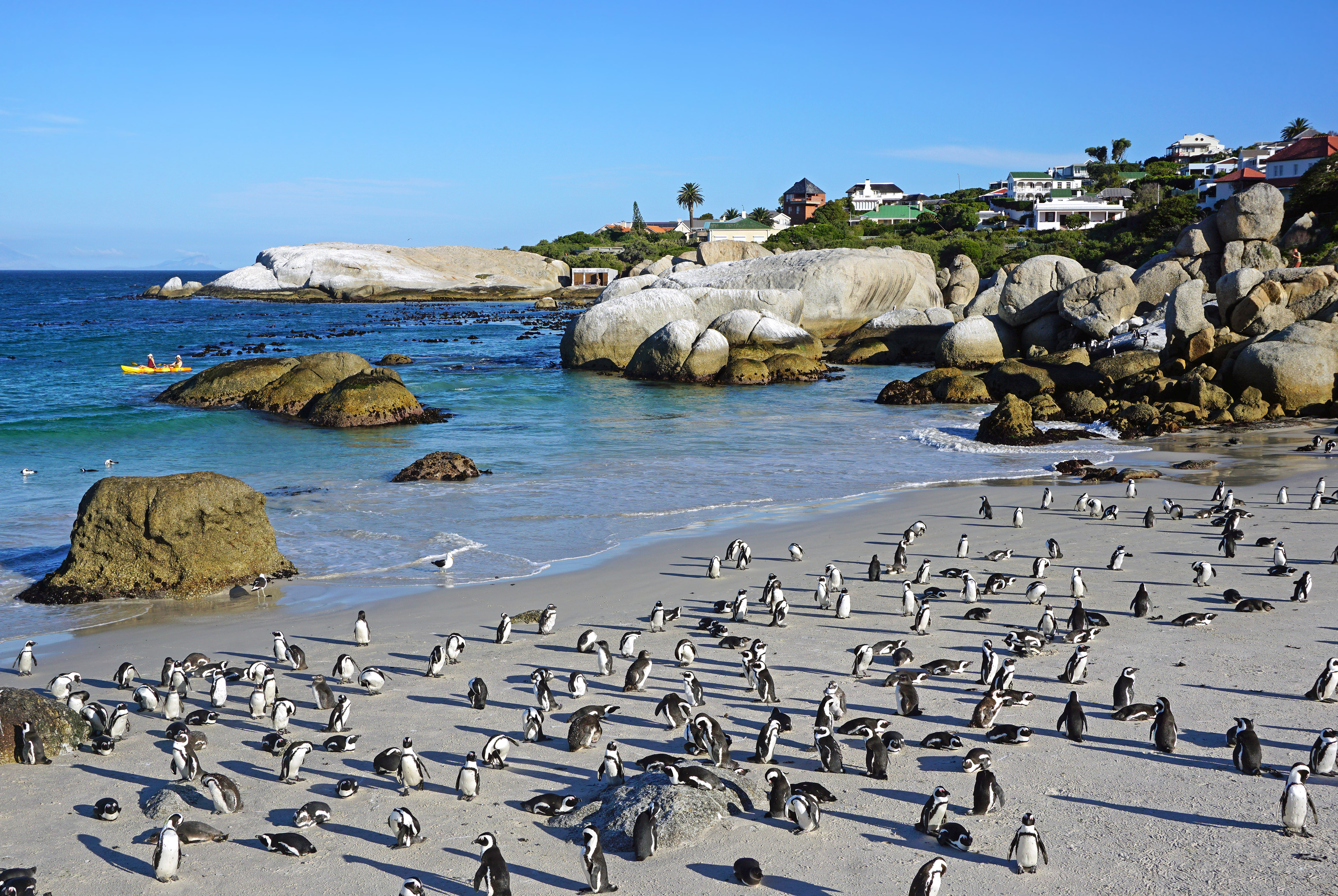
African penguins at Boulders Penguin Colony

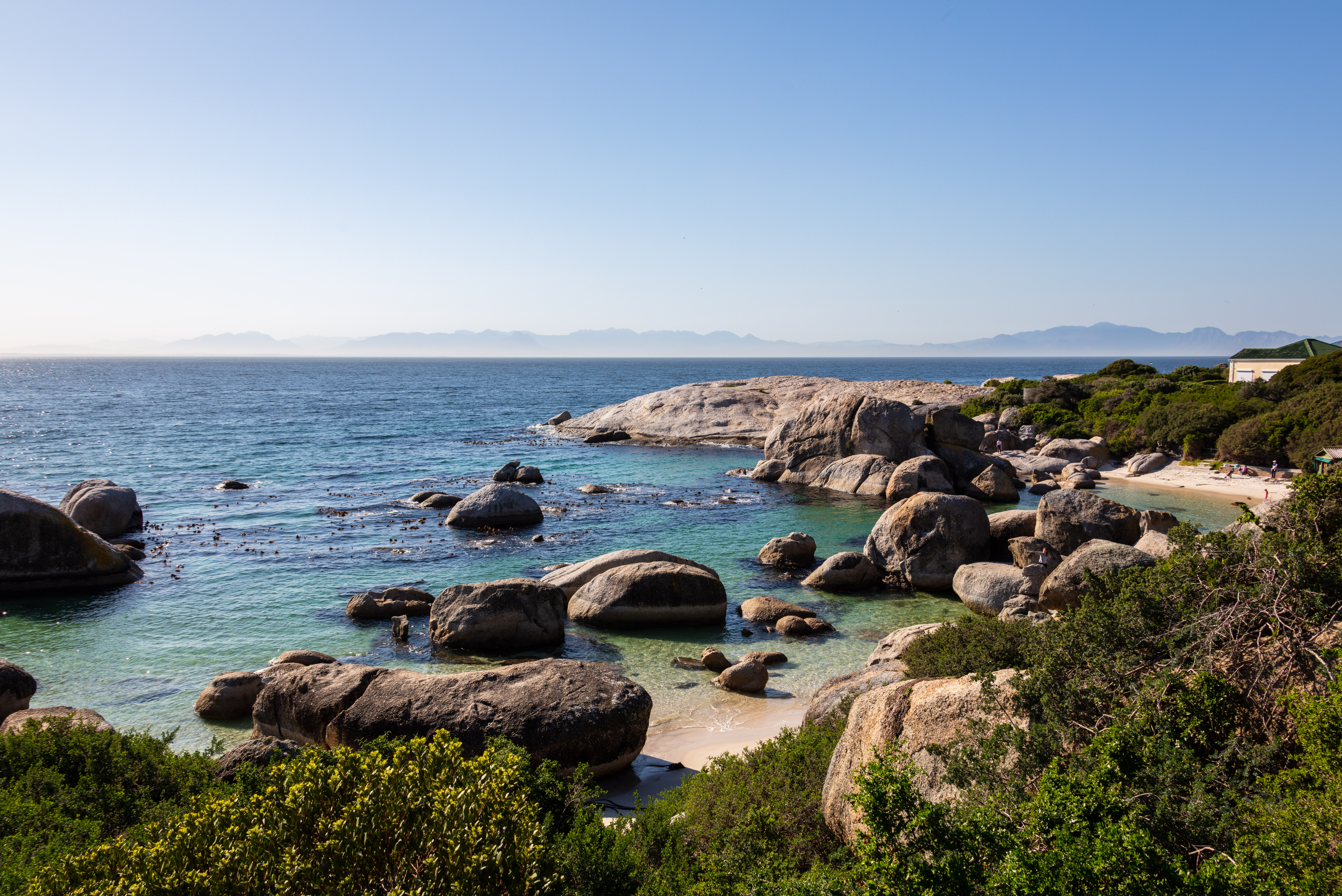
Rocks in Boulder Beach

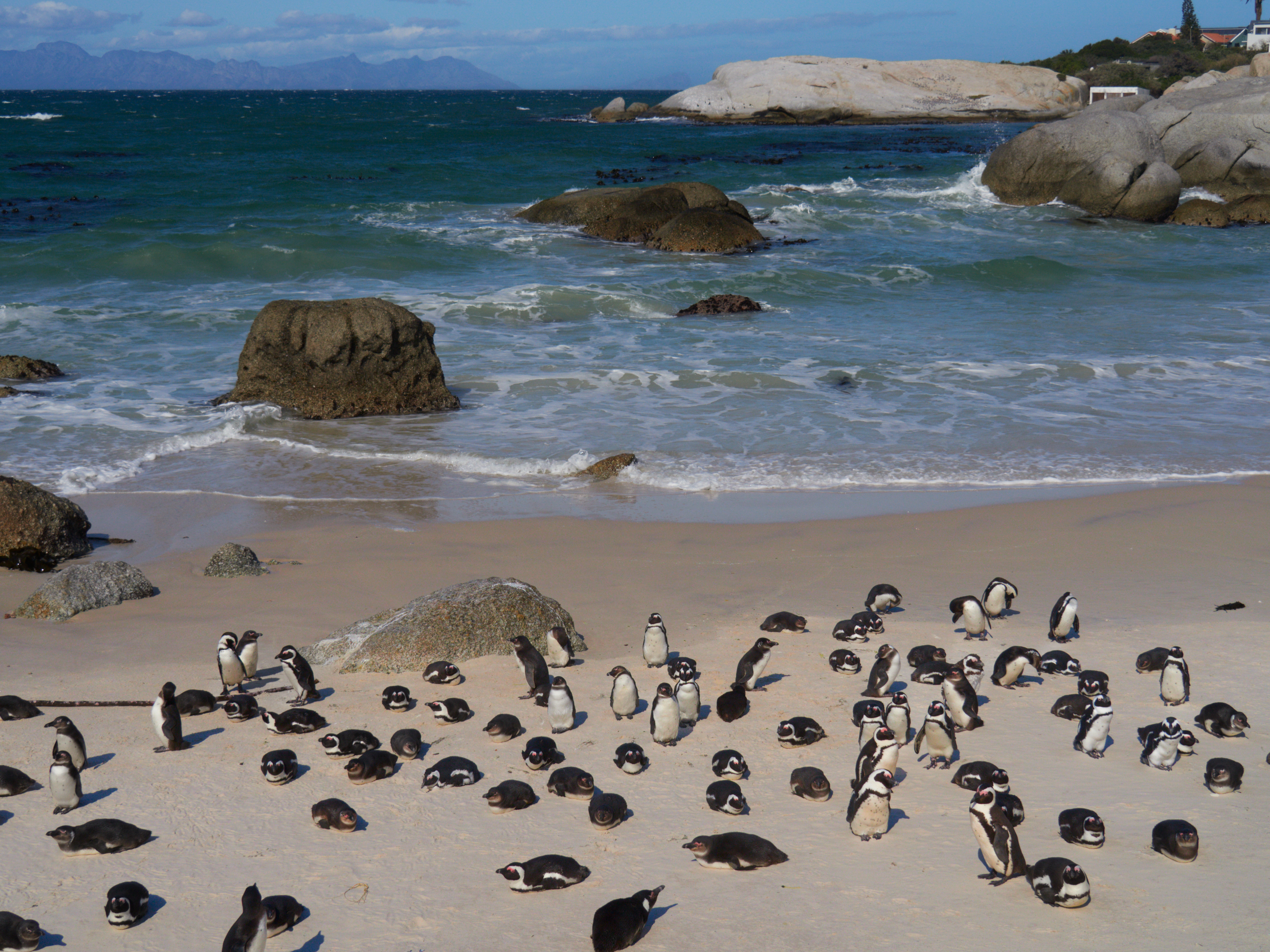
A colony of African penguins resting and standing on the sandy shore at Boulders Beach.

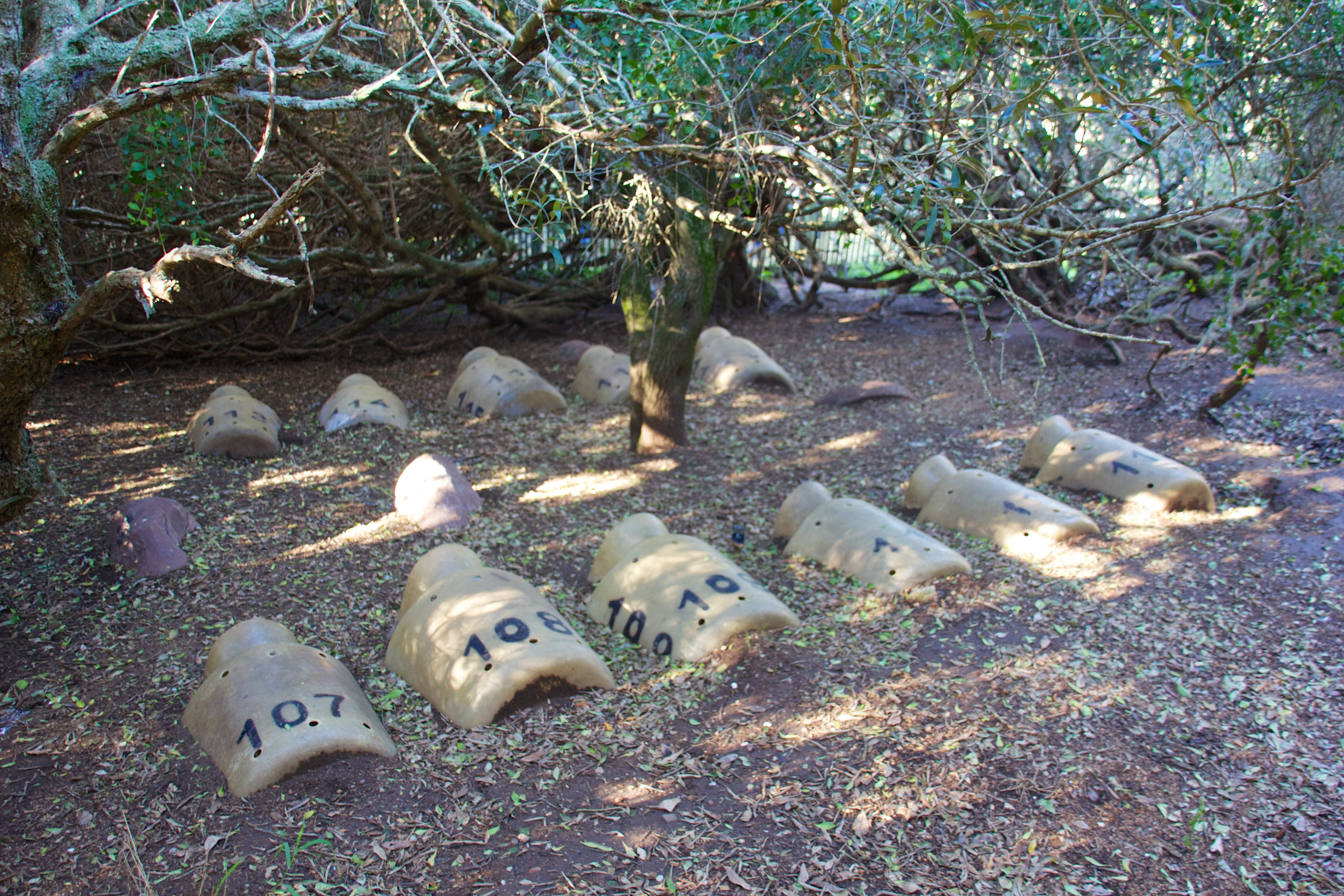
Penguin colony

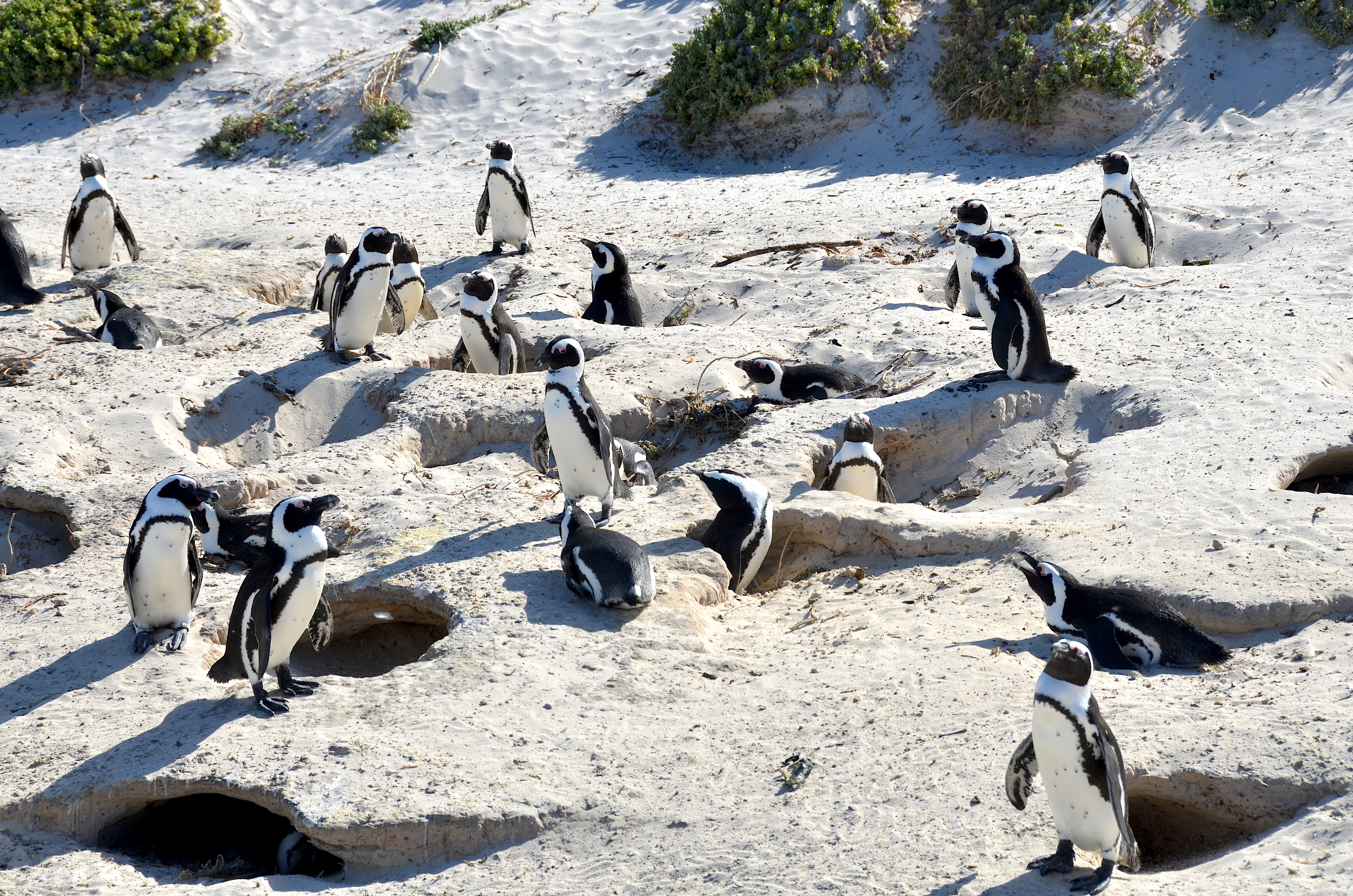
Nesting burrows of the African penguin

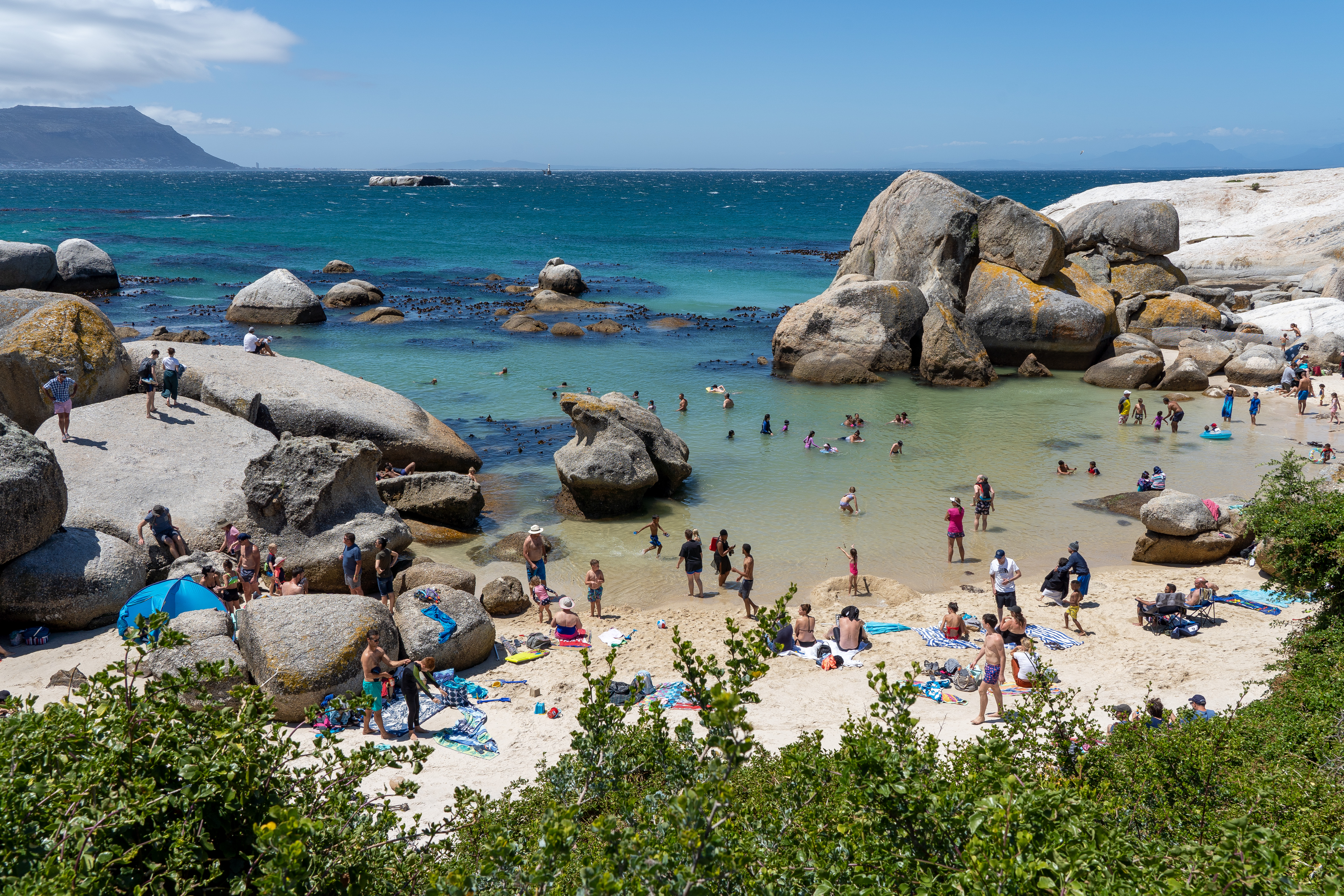
Swimmers enjoying the relatively calm waters of the sheltered beach next to the penguin colony

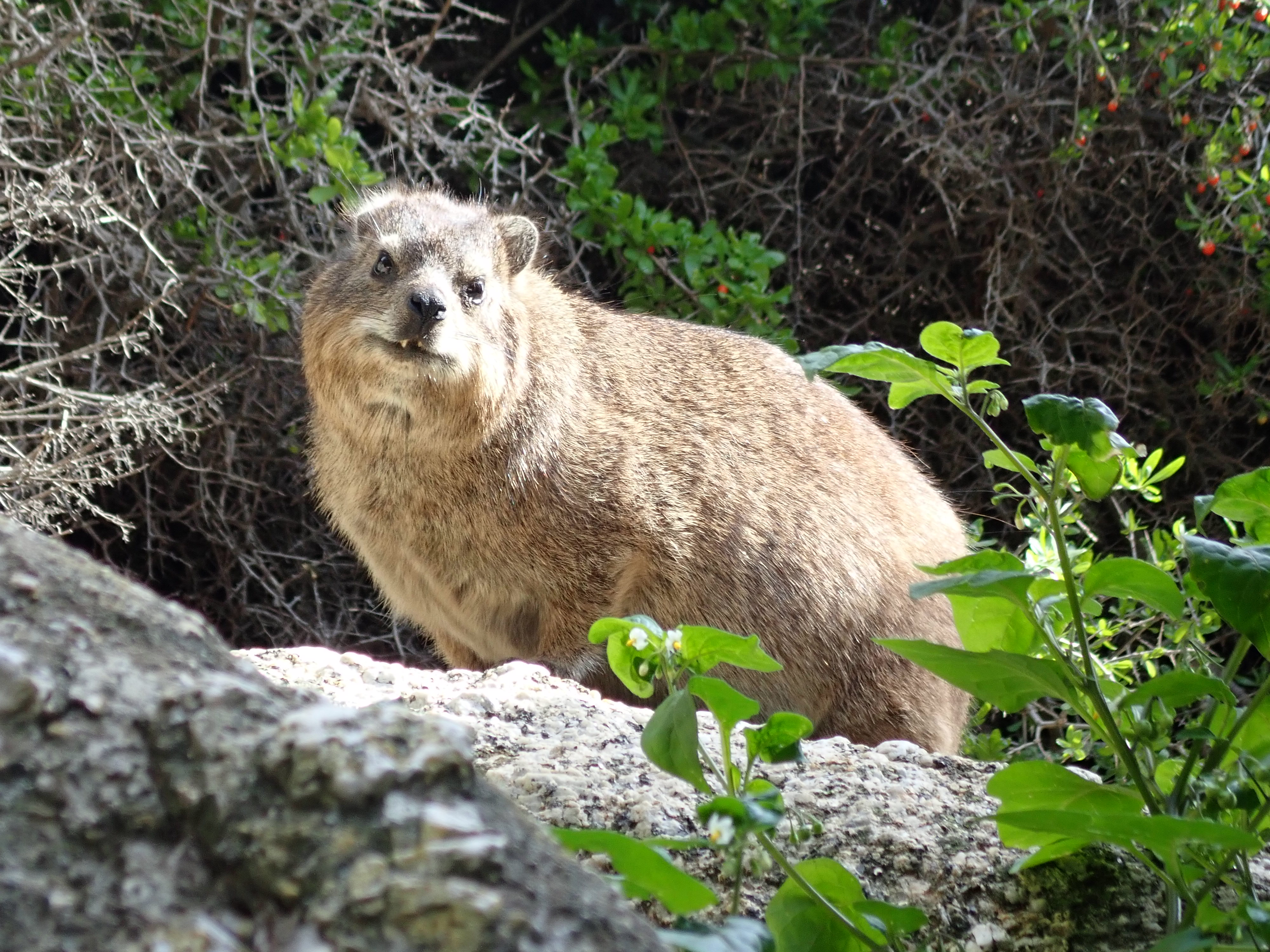
Dassie at Boulders Beach

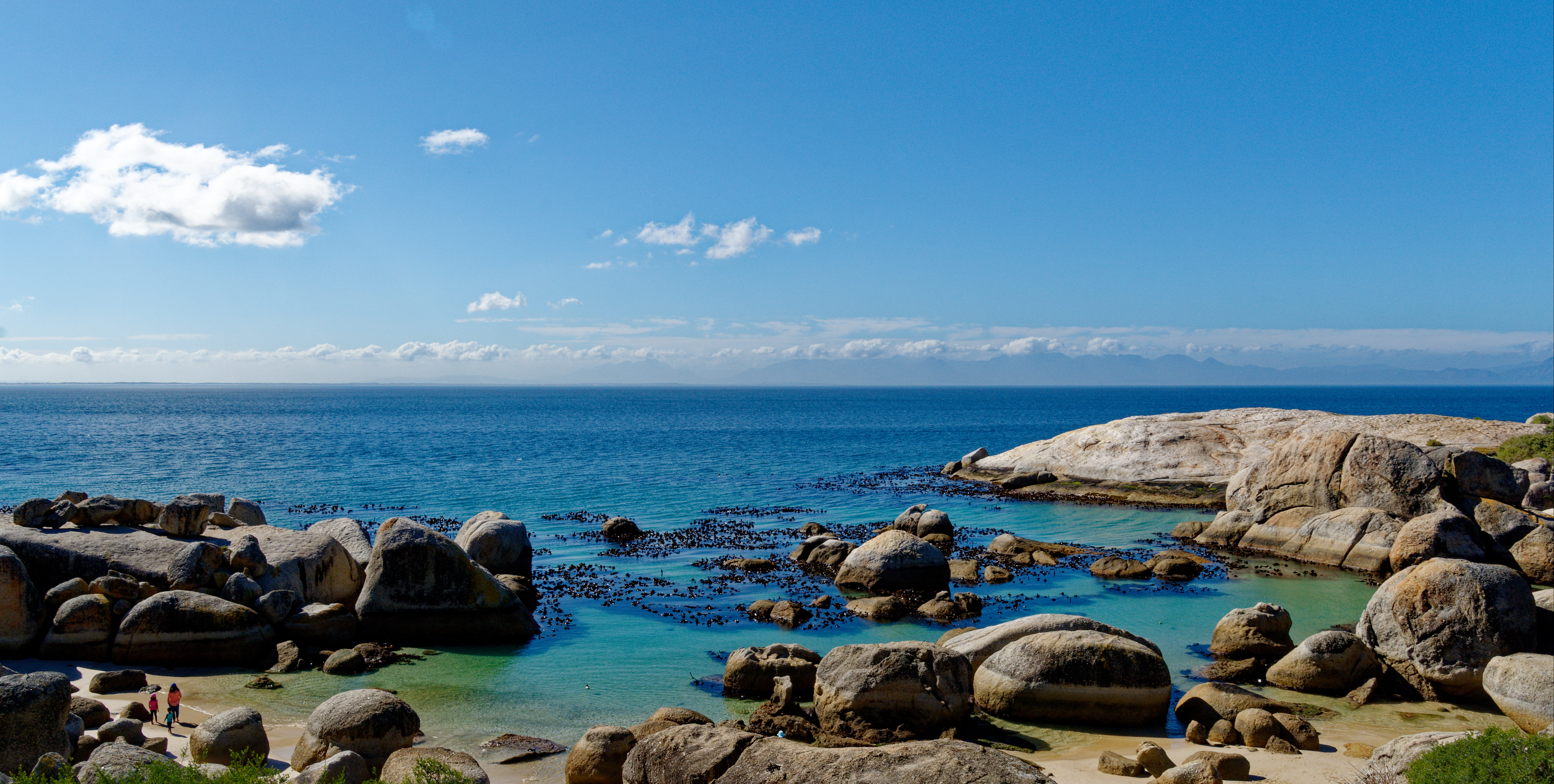
Boulders at the beach

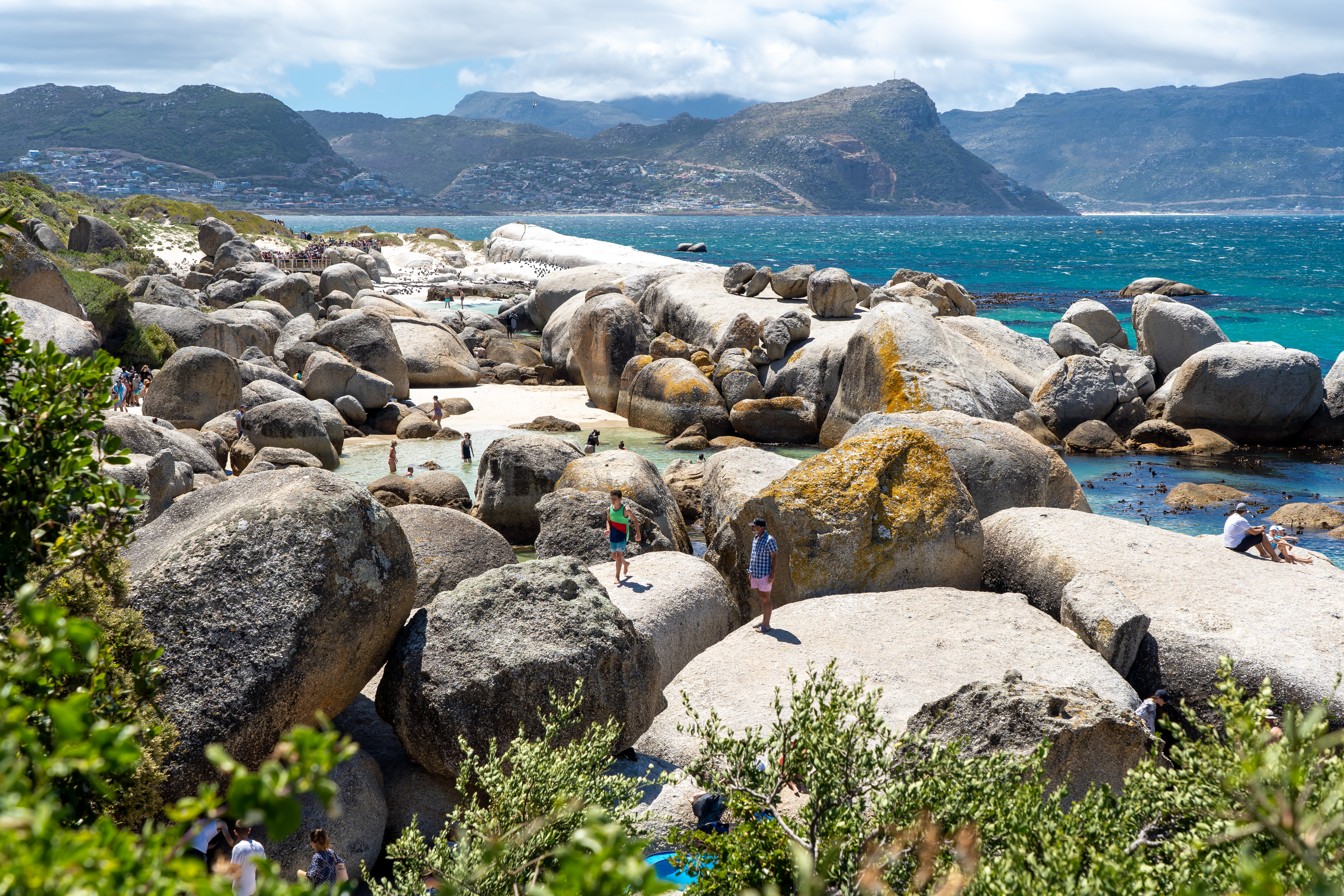
Boulders Beach with some swimmers. In the background, the penguin colony and visitors can be seen

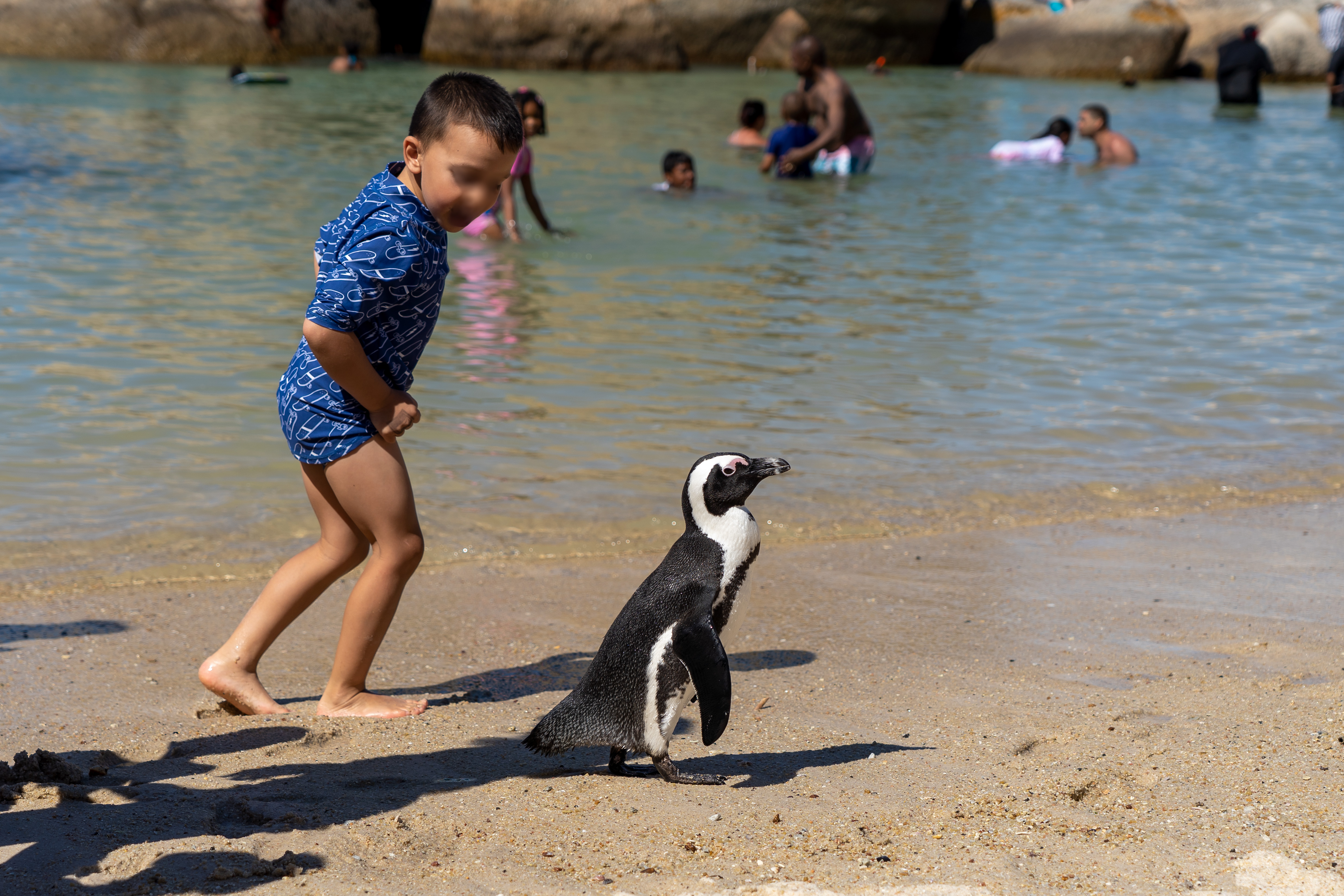
Swimmers and a penguin at the beach

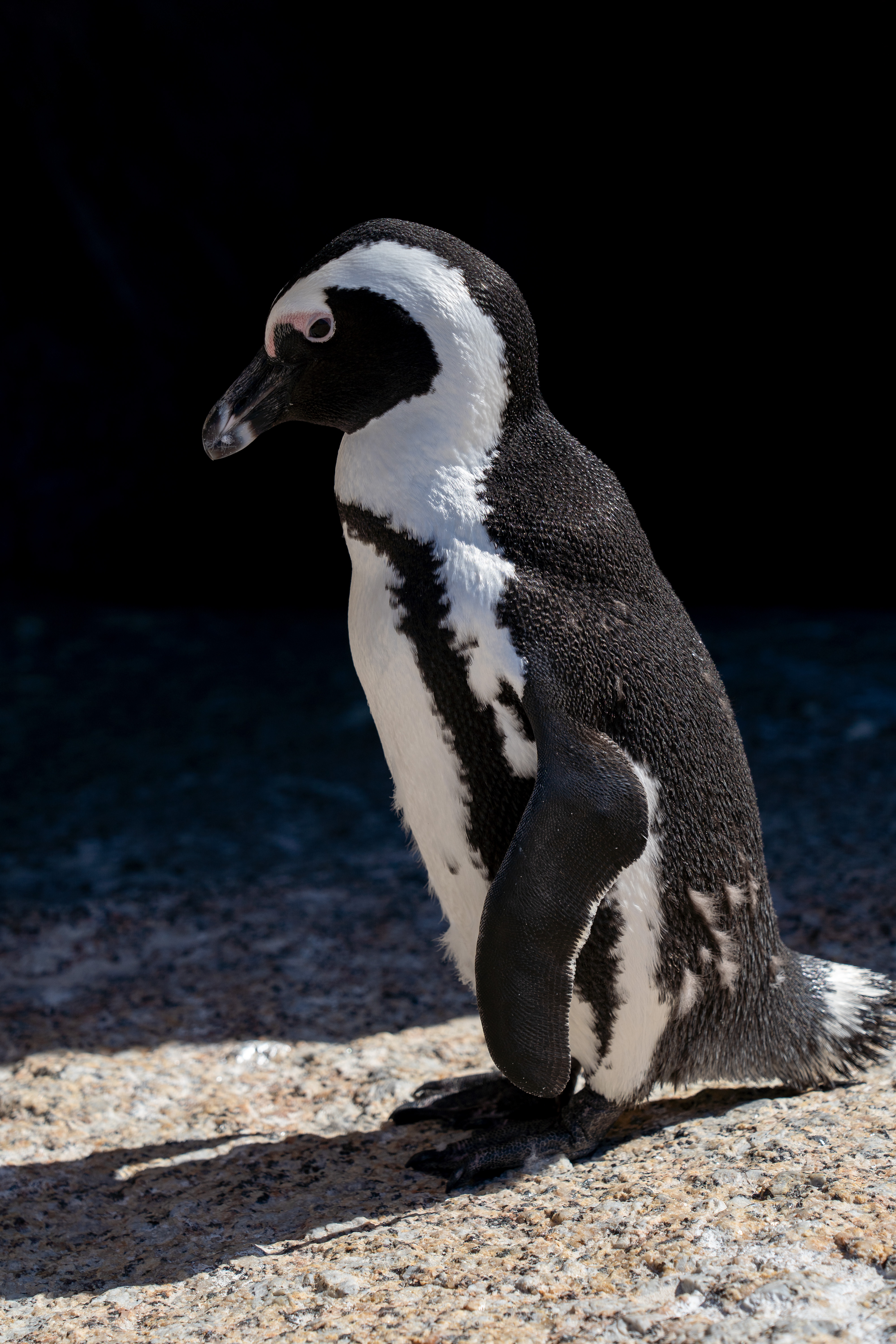
Penguin, Boulders Beach

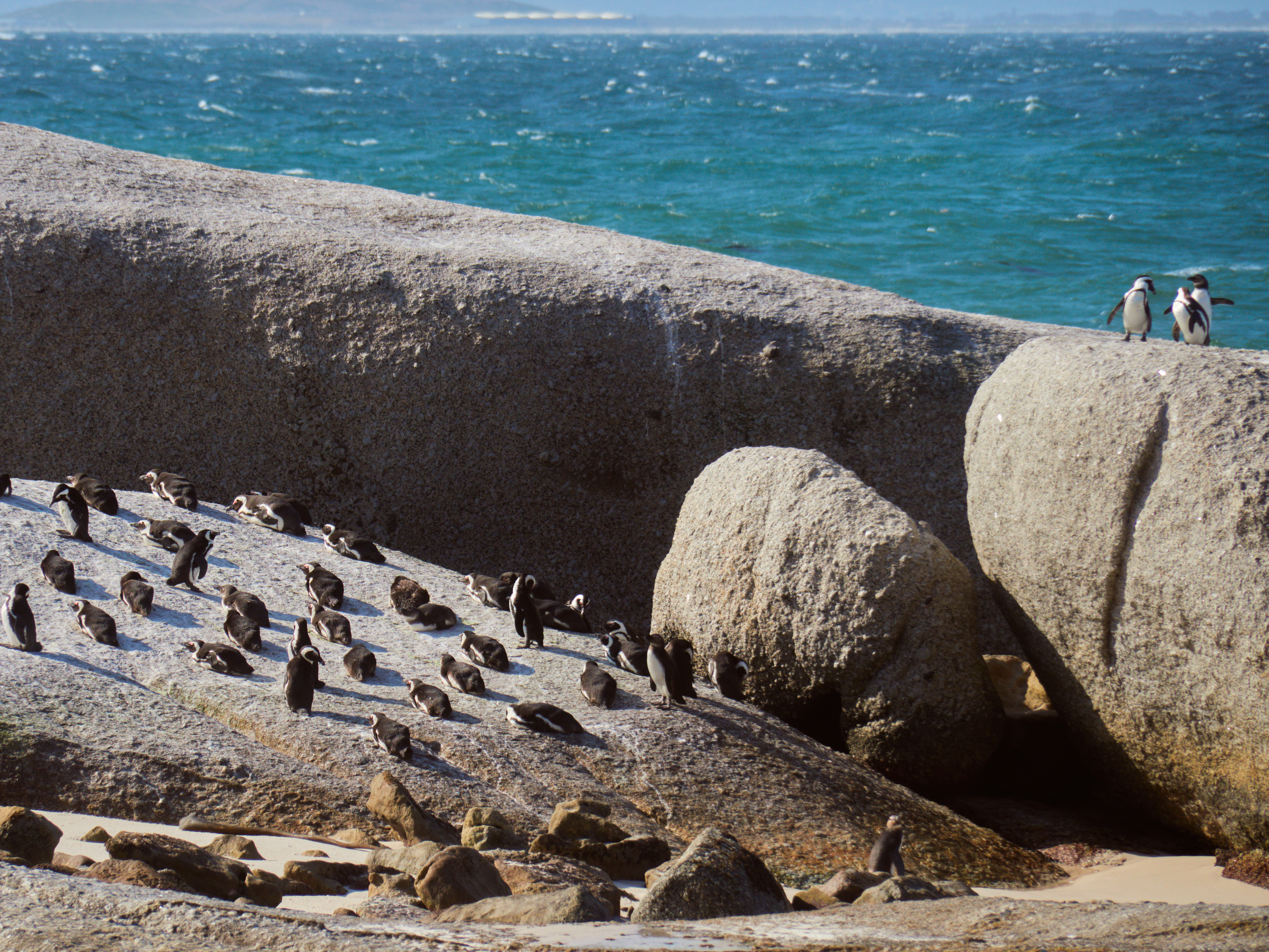
A colony of African penguins resting and standing on granite boulders at Boulders Beach.
