= List of birds of the British Antarctic Territory =

This is a list of the bird species recorded of British Antarctic Territory. The avifauna of British Antarctic Territory include a total of 98 species.

This list's taxonomic treatment (designation and sequence of orders, families and species) and nomenclature (common and scientific names) follow the conventions of The Clements Checklist of Birds of the World, 2022 edition. The family accounts at the beginning of each heading reflect this taxonomy, as do the species counts found in each family account. Introduced and accidental species are included in the total counts for British Antarctic Territory.

The following tag has been used to highlight accidental species.

- (A) Accidental - a species that rarely or accidentally occurs in British Antarctic Territory

== Ducks, geese, and waterfowl ==
Order: Anseriformes Family: Anatidae

Anatidae includes the ducks and most duck-like waterfowl, such as geese and swans. These birds are adapted to an aquatic existence with webbed feet, flattened bills, and feathers that are excellent at shedding water due to an oily coating.

- Black-necked swan, Cygnus melancoryphus (A)
- Upland goose, Chloephaga picta (A)
- Blue-winged teal, Spatula discors (A)
- Chiloe wigeon, Mareca sibilatrix (A)
- Yellow-billed pintail, Anas georgica
- Yellow-billed teal, Anas flavirostris

== Pigeons and doves ==
Order: Columbiformes Family: Columbidae

Pigeons and doves are stout-bodied birds with short necks and short slender bills with a fleshy cere.

- Eared dove, Zenaida auriculata (A)

== Rails, gallinules, and coots ==
Order: Gruiformes Family: Rallidae

Rallidae is a large family of small to medium-sized birds which includes the rails, crakes, coots, and gallinules. Typically they inhabit dense vegetation in damp environments near lakes, swamps, or rivers. In general they are shy and secretive birds, making them difficult to observe. Most species have strong legs and long toes which are well adapted to soft uneven surfaces. They tend to have short, rounded wings and to be weak fliers.

- Allen's gallinule, Porphyrio alleni (A)
- Purple gallinule, Porphyrio martinica (A)

== Sheathbills ==
Order: Charadriiformes Family: Chionididae

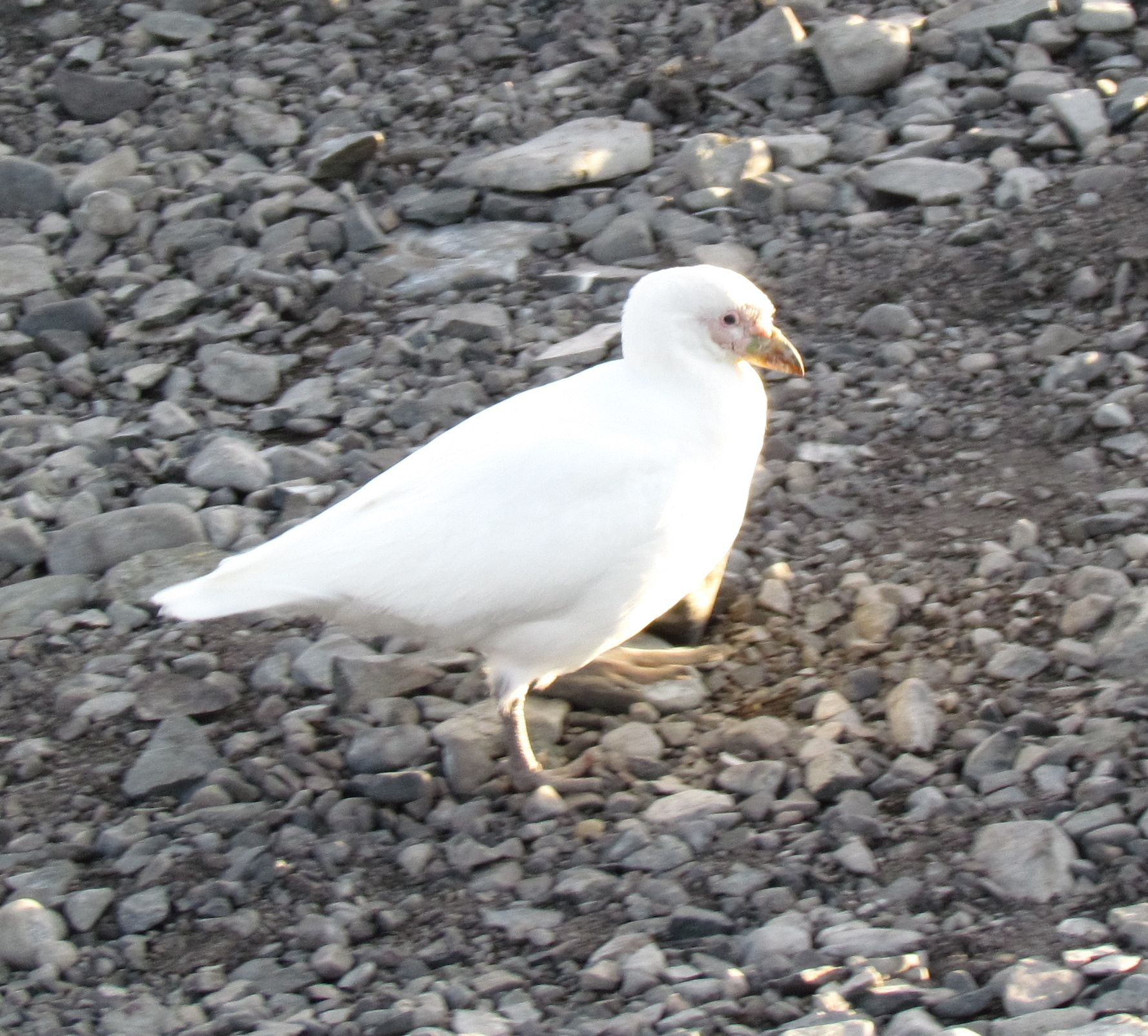
Snowy sheathbill, Chionis alba

The sheathbills are scavengers of the Antarctic regions. They have white plumage and look plump and dove-like but are believed to be similar to the ancestors of the modern gulls and terns.

- Snowy sheathbill, Chionis albus

== Sandpipers and allies ==
Order: Charadriiformes Family: Scolopacidae

Scolopacidae is a large diverse family of small to medium-sized shorebirds including the sandpipers, curlews, godwits, shanks, tattlers, woodcocks, snipes, dowitchers and phalaropes. The majority of these species eat small invertebrates picked out of the mud or soil. Variation in length of legs and bills enables multiple species to feed in the same habitat, particularly on the coast, without direct competition for food.

- Upland sandpiper, Bartramia longicauda (A)
- Baird's sandpiper, Calidris bairdii (A)
- Little stint, Calidris minuta (A)
- Least sandpiper, Calidris minutilla (A)
- White-rumped sandpiper, Calidris fuscicollis (A)
- Pectoral sandpiper, Calidris melanotos (A)
- Wilson's phalarope, Phalaropus tricolor (A)
- Solitary sandpiper, Tringa solitaria (A)

== Skuas and jaegers ==
Order: Charadriiformes Family: Stercorariidae

The family Stercorariidae are, in general, medium to large birds, typically with grey or brown plumage, often with white markings on the wings. They nest on the ground in temperate and arctic regions and are long-distance migrants.

- Chilean skua, Stercorarius chilensis (A)
- South polar skua, Stercorarius maccormicki
- Brown skua, Stercorarius antarctica
- Pomarine jaeger, Stercorarius pomarinus (A)
- Long-tailed jaeger, Stercorarius longicaudus (A)

== Gulls, terns, and skimmers ==
Order: Charadriiformes Family: Laridae

Laridae is a family of medium to large seabirds, the gulls, terns, and skimmers. Gulls are typically grey or white, often with black markings on the head or wings. They have stout, longish bills and webbed feet. Terns are a group of generally medium to large seabirds typically with grey or white plumage, often with black markings on the head. Most terns hunt fish by diving but some pick insects off the surface of fresh water. Terns are generally long-lived birds, with several species known to live in excess of 30 years.

- Brown-hooded gull, Chroicocephalus maculipennis (A)
- Dolphin gull, Leucophaeus scoresbii (A)
- Olrog's gull, Larus atlanticus (A)
- Kelp gull, Larus dominicanus
- Brown noddy, Anous stolidus
- Arctic tern, Sterna paradisaea
- Antarctic tern, Sterna vittata

== Penguins ==
Order: Sphenisciformes Family: Spheniscidae

The penguins are a group of aquatic, flightless birds living almost exclusively in the Southern Hemisphere. Most penguins feed on krill, fish, squid and other forms of sealife caught while swimming underwater.

- King penguin, Aptenodytes patagonicus
- Emperor penguin, Aptenodytes forsteri (A)
- Adelie penguin, Pygoscelis adeliae
- Gentoo penguin, Pygoscelis papua
- Chinstrap penguin, Pygoscelis antarctica
- Magellanic penguin, Spheniscus magellanicus
- Macaroni penguin, Eudyptes chrysolophus
- Royal penguin, Eudyptes schlegeli (A)
- Southern rockhopper penguin, Eudyptes chrysocome

== Albatrosses ==
Order: Procellariiformes Family: Diomedeidae

The albatrosses are among the largest of flying birds, and the great albatrosses from the genus Diomedea have the largest wingspans of any extant birds.

- Gray-headed albatross, Thalassarche chrysostoma
- White-capped albatross, Thalassarche cauta
- Salvin's albatross, Thalassarche salvini
- Black-browed albatross, Thalassarche melanophris
- Sooty albatross, Phoebetria fusca
- Light-mantled albatross, Phoebetria palpebrata
- Royal albatross, Diomedea epomophora
- Wandering albatross, Diomedea exulans

== Southern storm-petrels ==
Order: Procellariiformes Family: Oceanitidae

The southern storm-petrels are relatives of the petrels and are the smallest seabirds. They feed on planktonic crustaceans and small fish picked from the surface, typically while hovering. The flight is fluttering and sometimes bat-like.

- Wilson's storm-petrel, Oceanites oceanicus
- Gray-backed storm-petrel, Garrodia nereis
- White-faced storm-petrel, Pelagodroma marina
- White-bellied storm-petrel, Fregetta grallaria
- Black-bellied storm-petrel, Fregetta tropica

== Northern storm-petrels ==
Order: Procellariiformes Family: Hydrobatidae

The northern storm-petrels are relatives of the petrels and are the smallest seabirds. They feed on planktonic crustaceans and small fish picked from the surface, typically while hovering. The flight is fluttering and sometimes bat-like.

- Leach's storm-petrel, Hydrobates leucorhous (A)

== Shearwaters and petrels ==
Order: Procellariiformes Family: Procellariidae

The procellariids are the main group of medium-sized "true petrels", characterised by united nostrils with medium septum and a long outer functional primary.

- Southern giant-petrel, Macronectes giganteus
- Northern giant-petrel, Macronectes halli
- Southern fulmar, Fulmarus glacialoides
- Antarctic petrel, Thalassoica antarctica (A)
- Cape petrel, Daption capense
- Snow petrel, Pagodroma nivea
- Kerguelen petrel, Aphrodroma brevirostris
- Great-winged petrel, Pterodroma macroptera (A)
- Soft-plumaged petrel, Pterodroma mollis
- White-headed petrel, Pterodroma lessonii
- Atlantic petrel, Pterodroma incerta
- Blue petrel, Halobaena caerulea
- Fairy prion, Pachyptila turtur
- Broad-billed prion, Pachyptila vittata
- Salvin's prion, Pachyptila salvini
- Antarctic prion, Pachyptila desolata
- Slender-billed prion, Pachyptila belcheri
- Fulmar prion, Pachyptila crassirostris
- Gray petrel, Procellaria cinerea
- White-chinned petrel, Procellaria aequinoctialis
- Westland petrel, Procellaria westlandica (A)
- Flesh-footed shearwater, Ardenna carneipes
- Great shearwater, Ardenna gravis
- Sooty shearwater, Ardenna grisea
- Manx shearwater, Puffinus puffinus (A)
- Subantarctic shearwater, Puffinus elegans
- Common diving-petrel, Pelecanoides urinatrix
- South Georgia diving-petrel, Pelecanoides georgicus

== Cormorants and shags ==
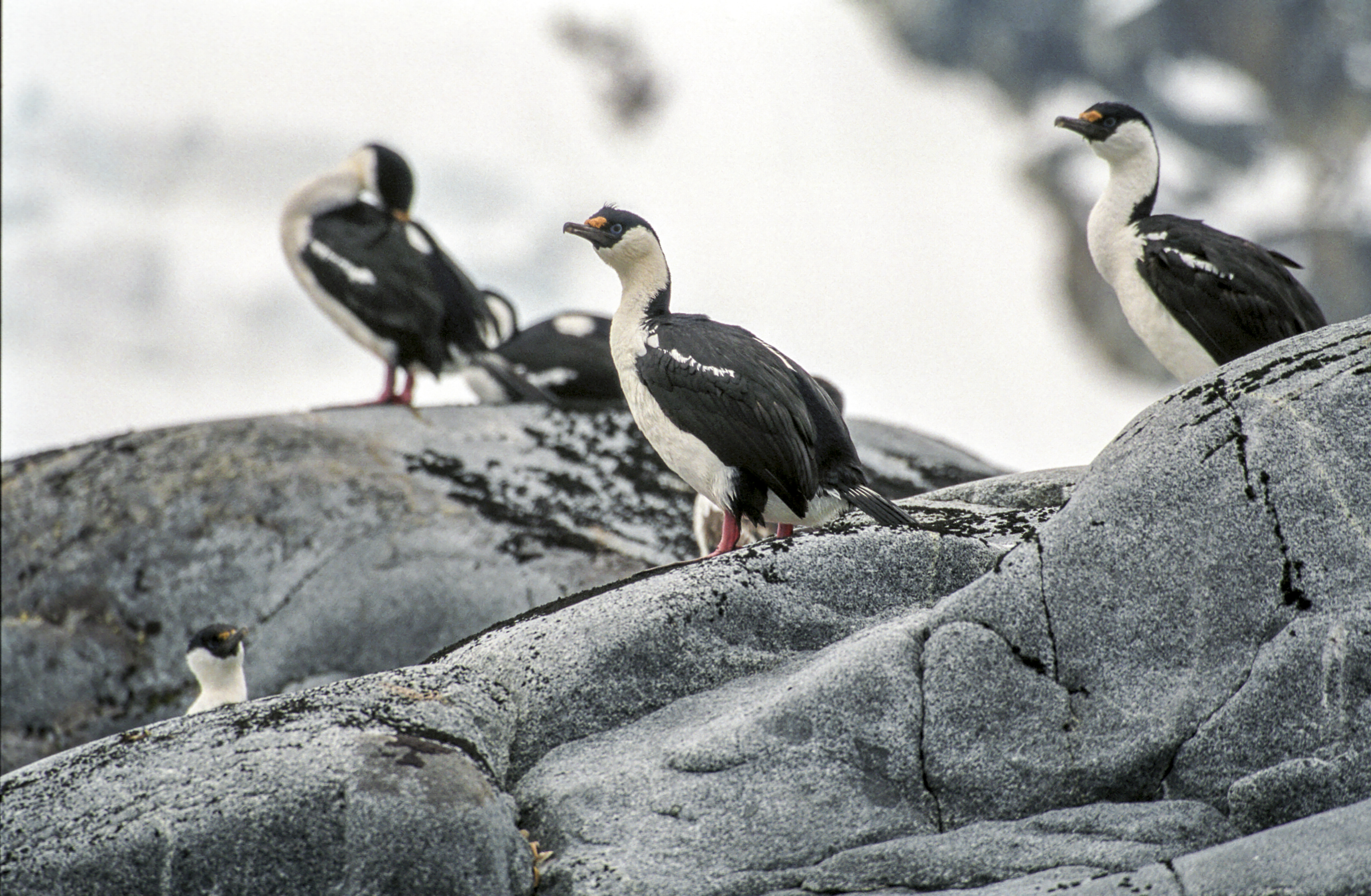
Antarctic shag, Phalacrocorax bransfieldensis

Order: Suliformes Family: Phalacrocoracidae

Phalacrocoracidae is a family of medium to large coastal, fish-eating seabirds that includes cormorants and shags. Plumage colouration varies, with the majority having mainly dark plumage, some species being black-and-white and a few being colourful.

- South Georgia shag, Leucocarbo georgianus
- Antarctic shag, Leucocarbo bransfield

== Herons, egrets, and bitterns ==
Order: Pelecaniformes Family: Ardeidae

The family Ardeidae contains the bitterns, herons and egrets. Herons and egrets are medium to large wading birds with long necks and legs. Bitterns tend to be shorter necked and more wary. Members of Ardeidae fly with their necks retracted, unlike other long-necked birds such as storks, ibises and spoonbills.

- Great egret, Ardea alba (A)
- Snowy egret, Egretta thula (A)
- Cattle egret, Bubulcus ibis (A)

== New World vultures ==
Order: Cathartiformes Family: Cathartidae

The New World vultures are not closely related to Old World vultures, but superficially resemble them because of convergent evolution. Like the Old World vultures, they are scavengers. However, unlike Old World vultures, which find carcasses by sight, New World vultures have a good sense of smell with which they locate carcasses.

- Turkey vulture, Cathartes aura (A)

== Barn-owls ==
Order: Strigiformes Family: Tytonidae

Barn-owls are medium to large owls with large heads and characteristic heart-shaped faces. They have long strong legs with powerful talons.

- Barn owl, Tyto alba (A)

== Falcons and caracaras ==
Order: Falconiformes Family: Falconidae

Falconidae is a family of diurnal birds of prey, notably the falcons and caracaras. They differ from hawks, eagles, and kites in that they kill with their beaks instead of their talons. Eight species have been recorded in Massachusetts.

- Peregrine falcon, Falco peregrinus (A)

== Tyrant flycatchers ==
Order: Passeriformes Family: Tyrannidae

Tyrant flycatchers are Passerine birds which occur throughout North and South America. They superficially resemble the Old World flycatchers, but are more robust and have stronger bills. They do not have the sophisticated vocal capabilities of the songbirds. Most, but not all, are rather plain. As the name implies, most are insectivorous.

- White-crested elaenia, Elaenia albiceps (A)
- Dark-faced ground-tyrant, Muscisaxicola maclovianus (A)
- Eastern kingbird, Tyrannus tyrannus (A)

== Swallows ==
Order: Passeriformes Family: Hirundinidae

The family Hirundinidae is adapted to aerial feeding. They have a slender streamlined body, long pointed wings, and a short bill with a wide gape. The feet are adapted to perching rather than walking, and the front toes are partially joined at the base.

- Chilean swallow, Tachycineta leucopyga (A)
- Barn swallow, Hirundo rustica (A)
- Common house-martin, Delichon urbicum (A)

== Old World sparrows ==
Order: Passeriformes Family: Passeridae

Old World sparrows are small passerine birds. In general, sparrows tend to be small plump brownish or grayish birds with short tails and short powerful beaks. Sparrows are seed eaters, but they also consume

- House sparrow, Passer domesticus (A)

== Wagtails and pipits ==
Order: Passeriformes Family: Motacillidae

Motacillidae is a family of small passerine birds with medium to long tails. They include the wagtails, longclaws, and pipits. They are slender ground-feeding insectivores of open country.

- South Georgia pipit, Anthus antarcticus

== Troupials and allies ==
Order: Passeriformes Family: Icteridae

The icterids are a group of small to medium-sized, often colorful passerine birds restricted to the New World and include the grackles, New World blackbirds, and New World orioles. Most species have black as a predominant plumage color, often enlivened by yellow, orange, or red.

- Long-tailed meadowlark, Leistes loyca (A)

== See also ==
- List of birds
- Lists of birds by region
