= List of birds of Antarctica =

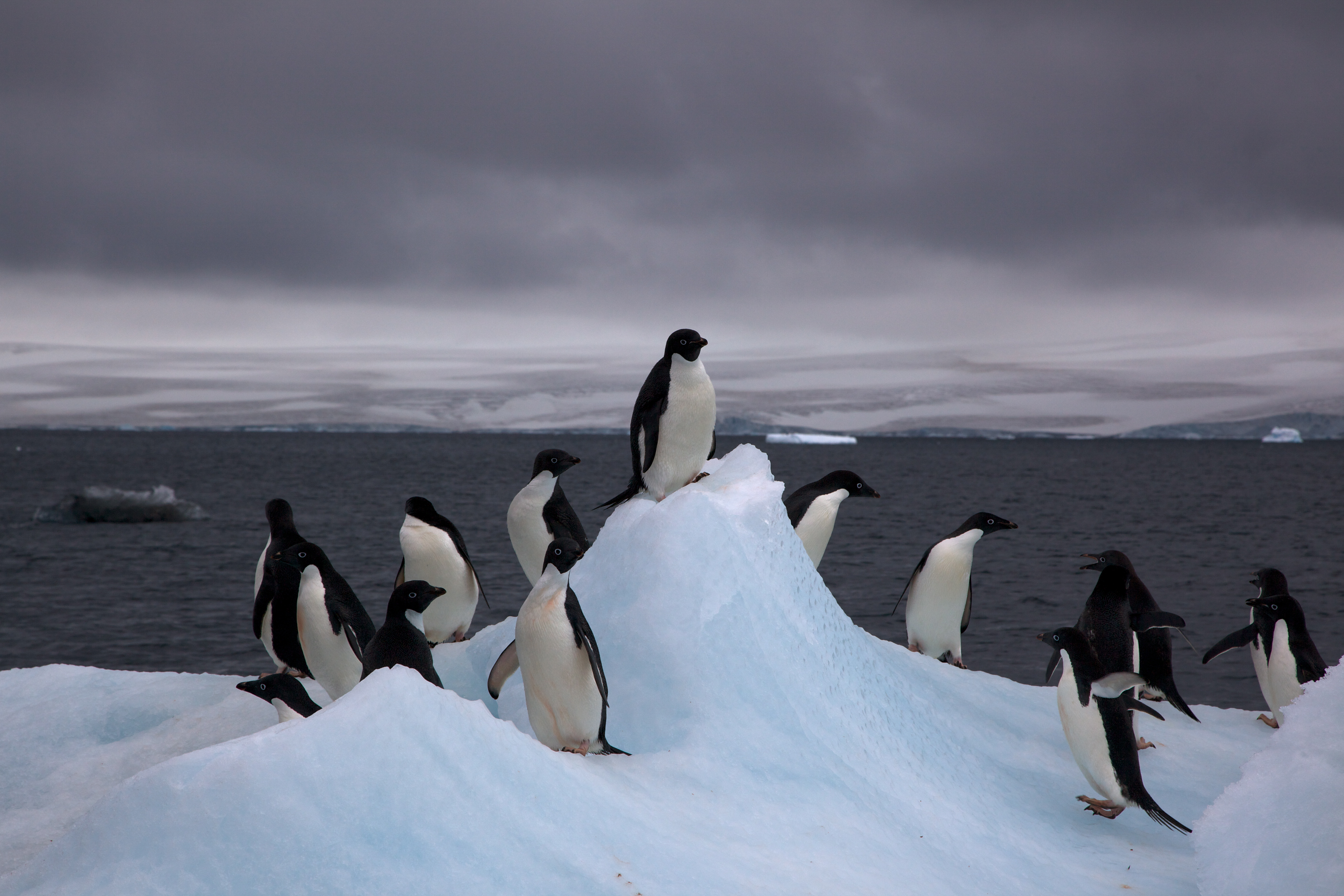
Adelie penguins in Antarctica

This is a list of the bird species recorded in Antarctica. The avifauna of Antarctica include a total of 63 species, of which 1 is endemic. This list's taxonomic treatment (designation and sequence of orders, families and species) and nomenclature (common and scientific names) follow the conventions of The Clements Checklist of Birds of the World, 2022 edition. The family accounts at the beginning of each heading reflect this taxonomy, as do the species counts found in each family account.

The following tags have been used to highlight several categories. The commonly occurring native species do not fall into any of these categories.

- (A) Accidental - a species that rarely or accidentally occurs in Antarctica
- (E) Endemic - a species endemic to Antarctica

== Ducks, geese, and waterfowl ==
Order: Anseriformes Family: Anatidae

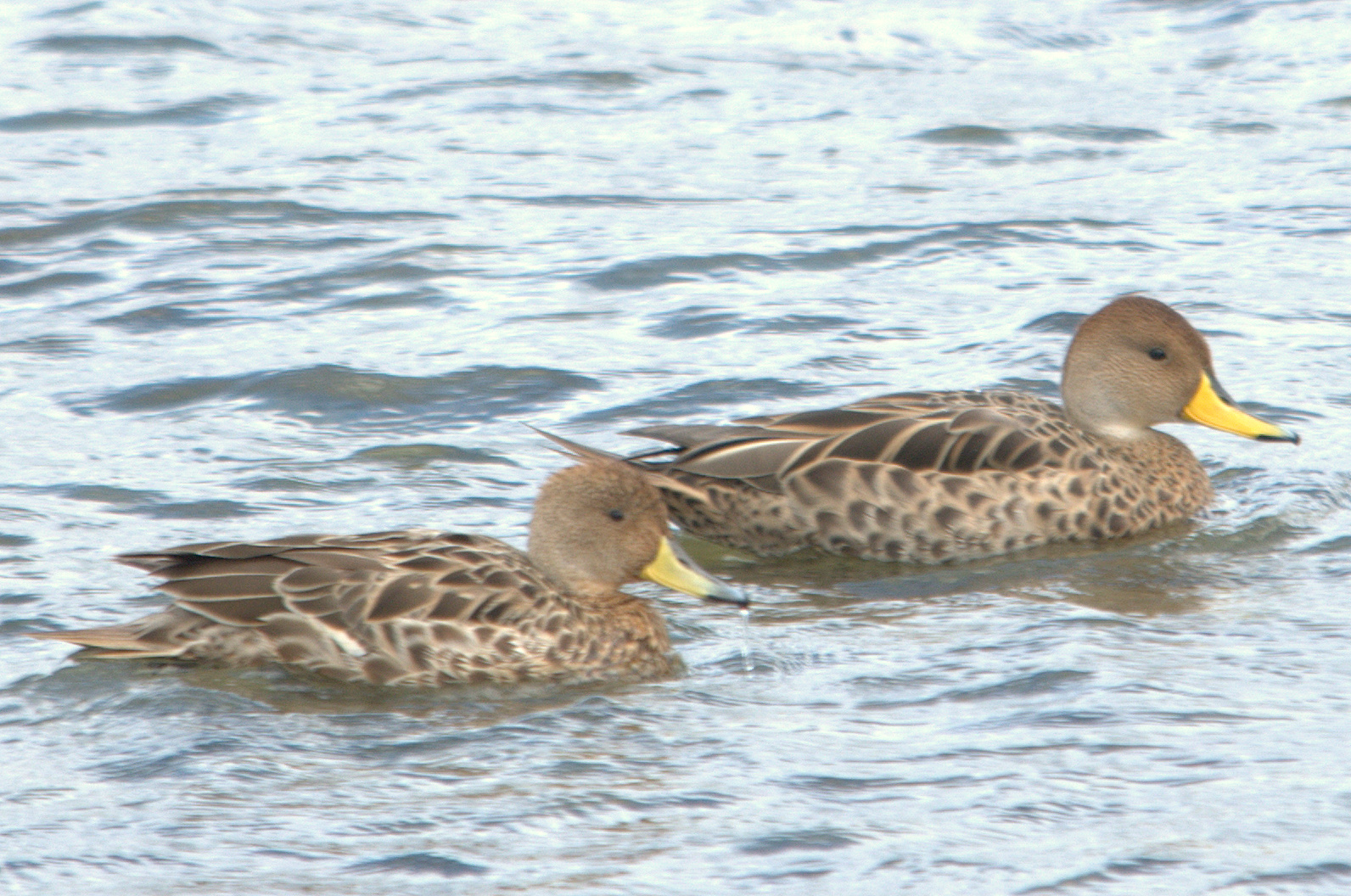
Yellow-billed pintail, Anas georgica

Anatidae includes the ducks and most duck-like waterfowl, such as geese and swans. These birds are adapted to an aquatic existence with webbed feet, flattened bills, and feathers that are excellent at shedding water due to an oily coating.

- Yellow-billed pintail, Anas georgica (A)

== Sheathbills ==
Order: Charadriiformes Family: Chionididae

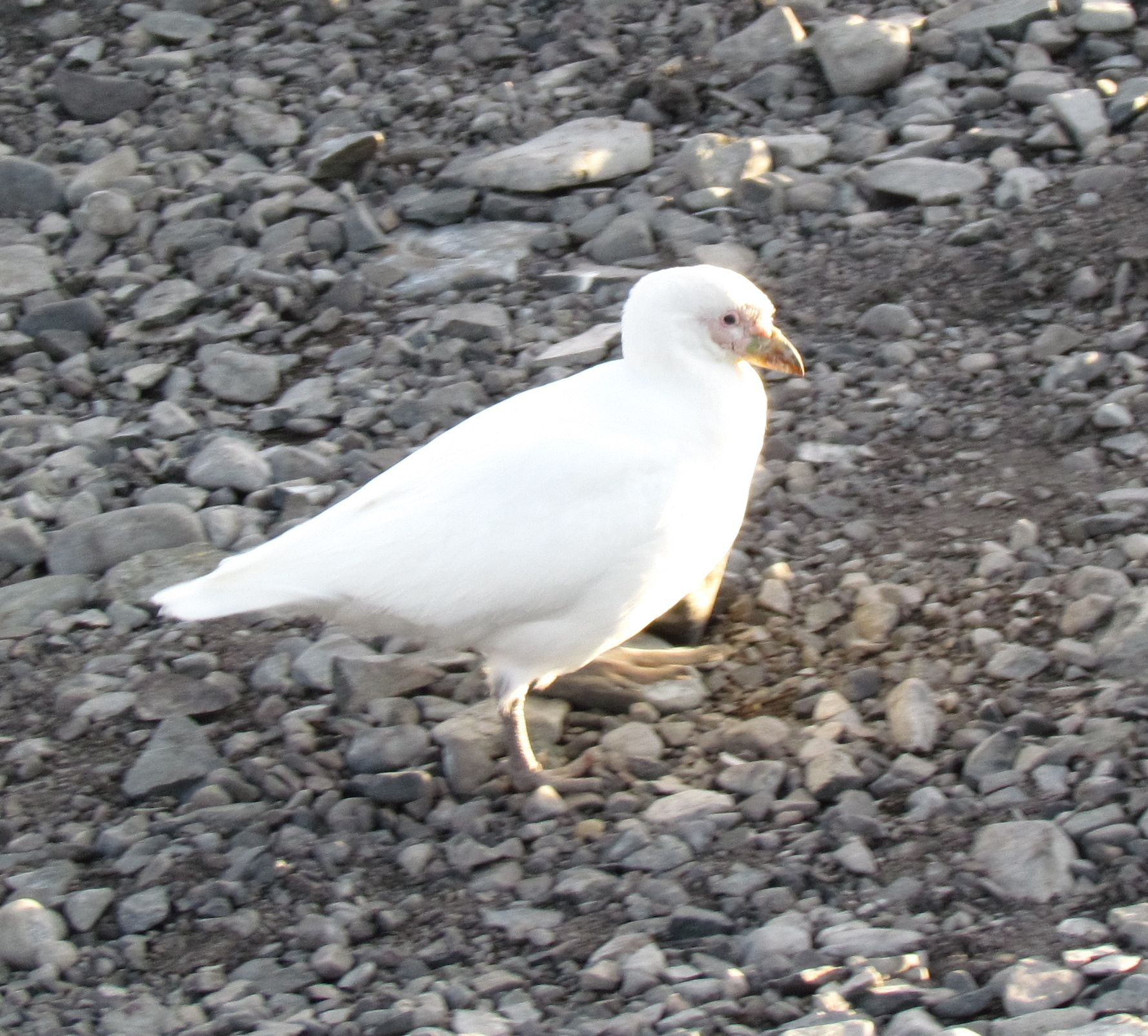
Snowy sheathbill, Chionis alba

The sheathbills are scavengers of the Antarctic regions. They have white plumage and look plump and dove-like but are believed to be similar to the ancestors of the modern gulls and terns.

- Snowy sheathbill, Chionis albus

== Sandpipers and allies ==
Order: Charadriiformes Family: Scolopacidae

Scolopacidae is a large diverse family of small to medium-sized shorebirds including the sandpipers, curlews, godwits, shanks, tattlers, woodcocks, snipes, dowitchers and phalaropes. The majority of these species eat small invertebrates picked out of the mud or soil. Variation in length of legs and bills enables multiple species to feed in the same habitat, particularly on the coast, without direct competition for food.

- Upland sandpiper, Bartramia longicauda (A)

== Skuas and jaegers ==
Order: Charadriiformes Family: Stercorariidae

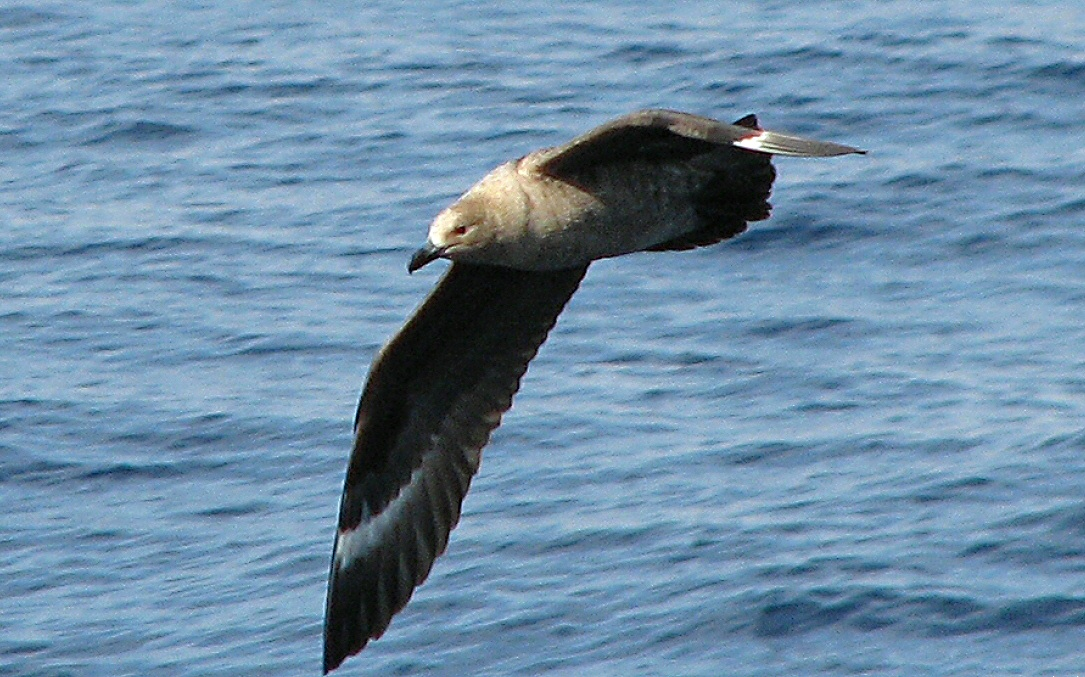
South polar skua, Stercorarius maccormicki

The family Stercorariidae are, in general, medium to large birds, typically with grey or brown plumage, often with white markings on the wings. They nest on the ground in temperate and arctic regions and are long-distance migrants.

- Chilean skua, Stercorarius chilensis (A)
- South polar skua, Stercorarius maccormicki
- Brown skua, Stercorarius antarctica
- Pomarine jaeger, Stercorarius pomarinus (A)
- Parasitic jaeger, Stercorarius parasiticus (A)
- Long-tailed jaeger, Stercorarius longicaudus (A)

== Gulls, terns, and skimmers ==
Order: Charadriiformes Family: Laridae

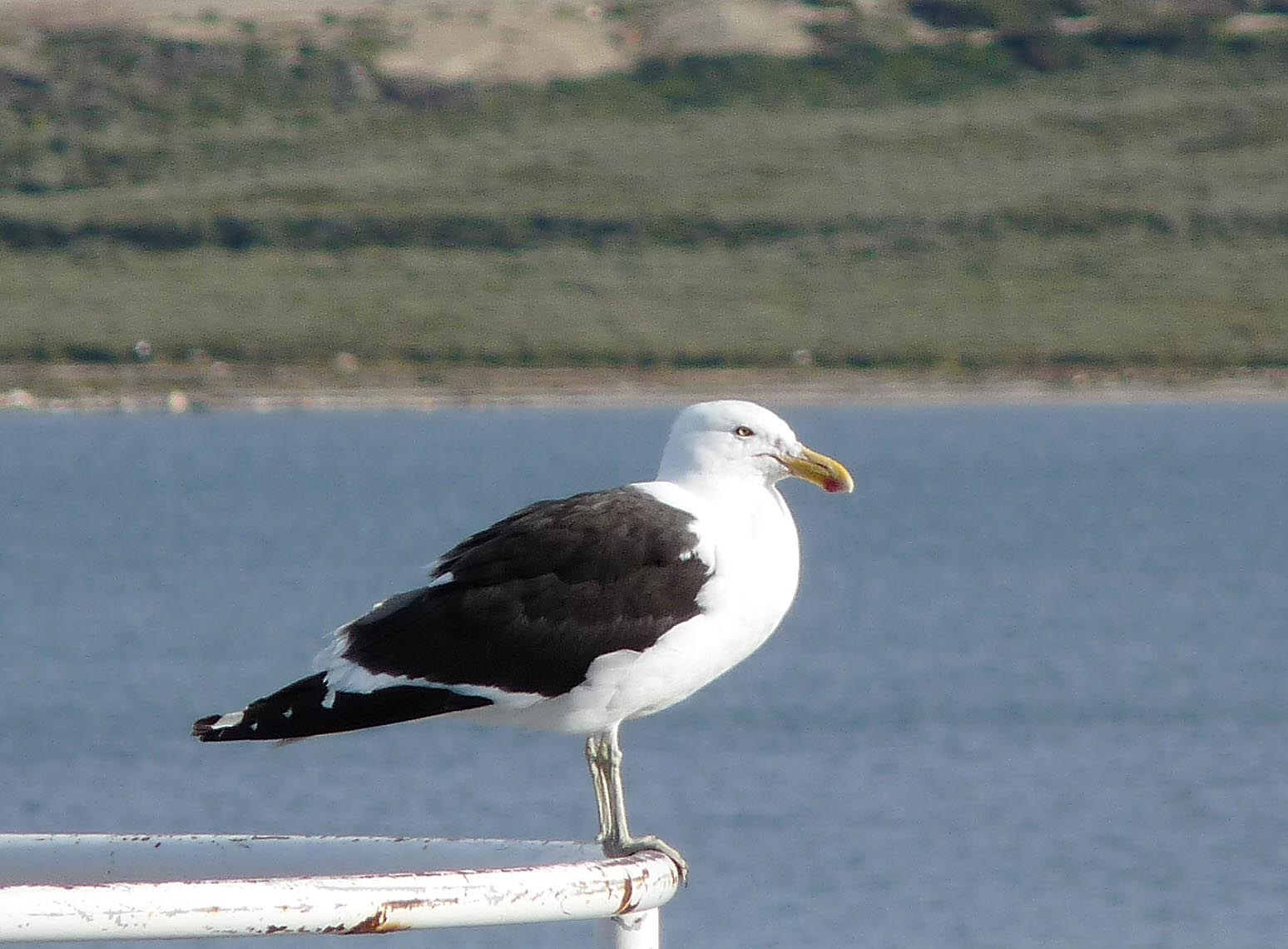
Kelp gull, Larus dominicanus

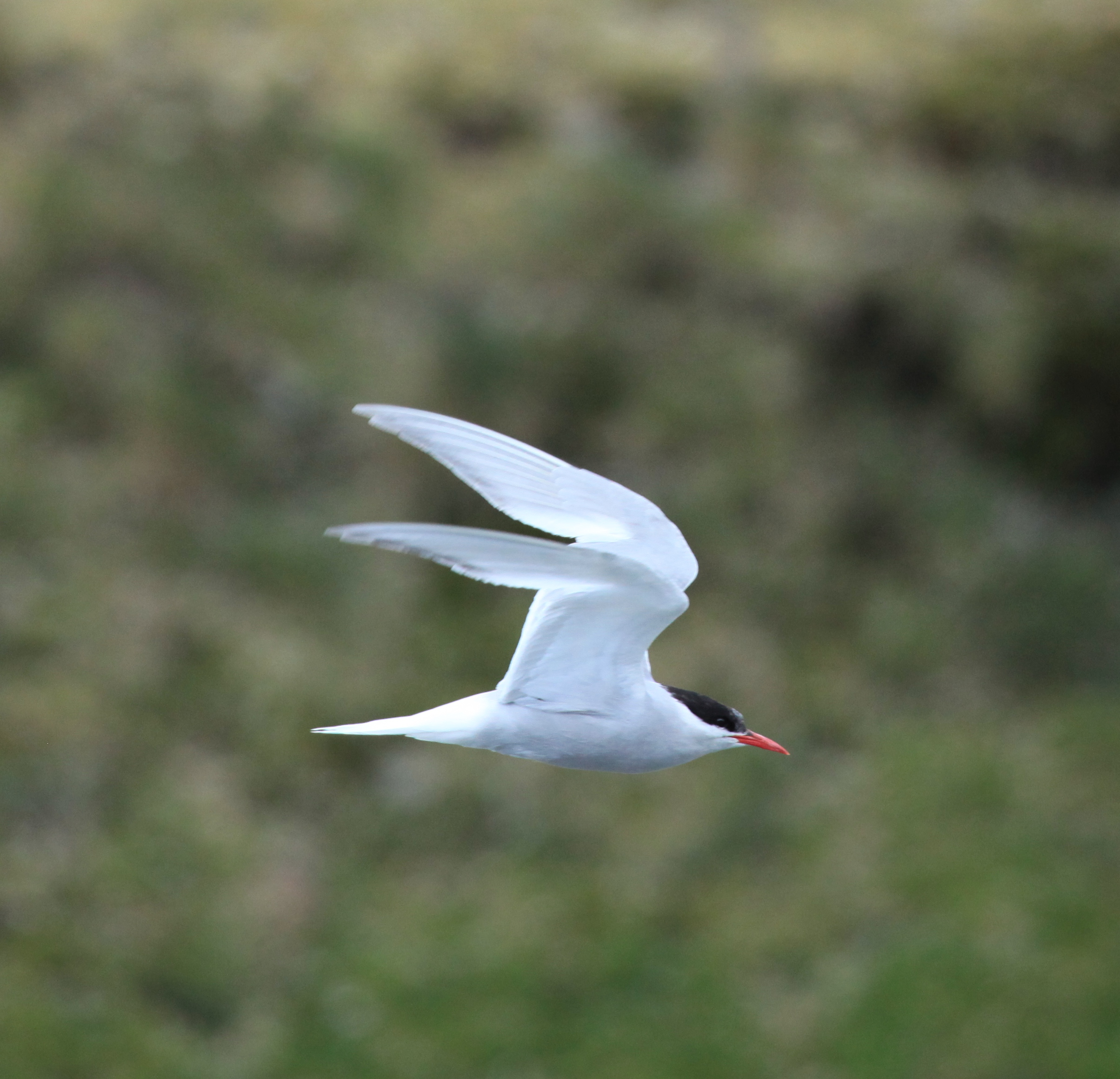
Antarctic tern, Sterna vittata

Laridae is a family of medium to large seabirds, the gulls, terns, and skimmers. Gulls are typically grey or white, often with black markings on the head or wings. They have stout, longish bills and webbed feet. Terns are a group of generally medium to large seabirds typically with grey or white plumage, often with black markings on the head. Most terns hunt fish by diving but some pick insects off the surface of fresh water. Terns are generally long-lived birds, with several species known to live in excess of 30 years.

- Sabine's gull, Xema sabini (A)
- Franklin's gull, Leucophaeus pipixcan (A)
- Kelp gull, Larus dominicanus
- Arctic tern, Sterna paradisaea
- Antarctic tern, Sterna vittata

== Penguins ==
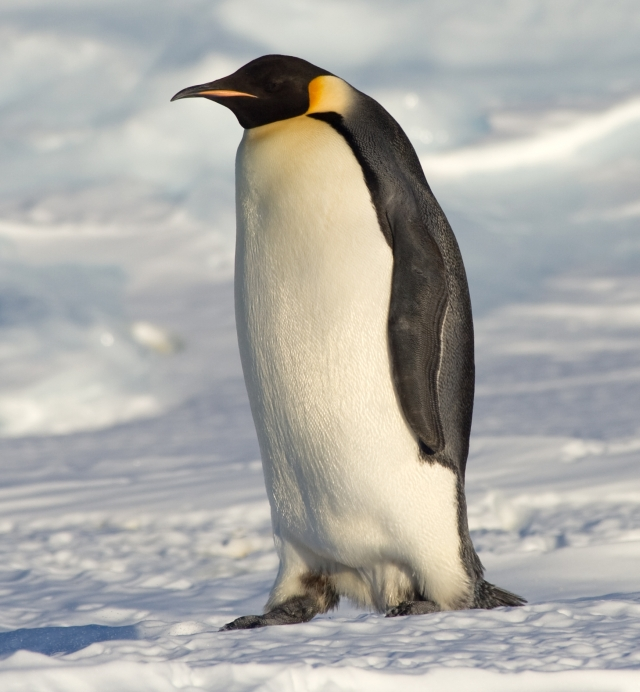
Emperor penguin, Aptenodytes forsteri

Order: Sphenisciformes Family: Spheniscidae

The penguins are a group of aquatic, flightless birds living almost exclusively in the Southern Hemisphere. Most penguins feed on krill, fish, squid and other forms of sea life caught while swimming underwater.

- Emperor penguin, Aptenodytes forsteri (E)
- Adélie penguin, Pygoscelis adeliae
- Gentoo penguin, Pygoscelis papua
- Chinstrap penguin, Pygoscelis antarctica
- Macaroni penguin, Eudyptes chrysolophus

== Albatrosses ==
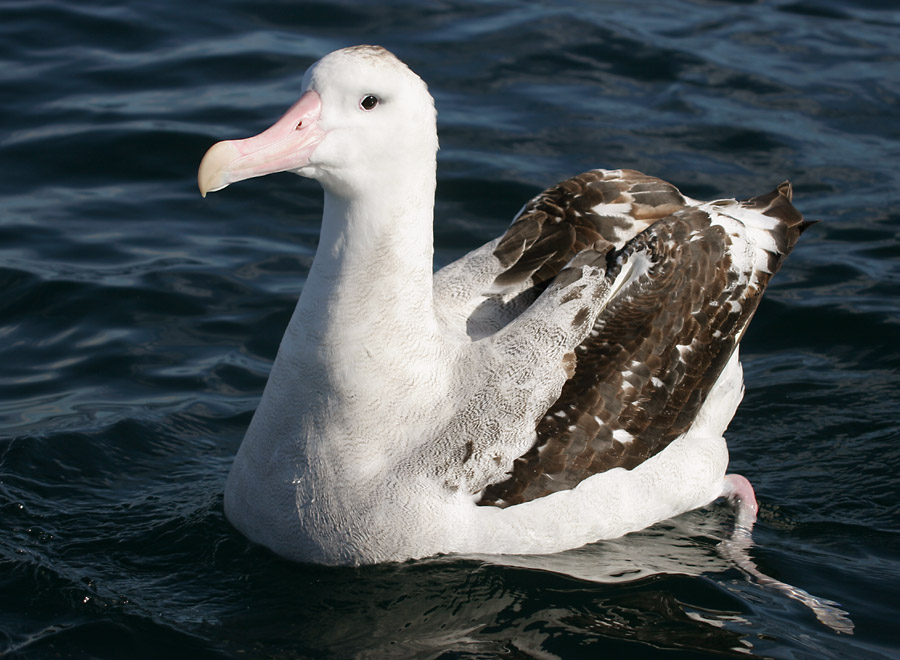
Wandering albatross, Diomedea exulans

Order: Procellariiformes Family: Diomedeidae

The albatrosses are among the largest of flying birds, and the great albatrosses from the genus Diomedea have the largest wingspans of any extant birds.

- Gray-headed albatross, Thalassarche chrysostoma
- White-capped albatross, Thalassarche cauta (A)
- Salvin's albatross, Thalassarche salvini (A)
- Black-browed albatross, Thalassarche melanophris
- Sooty albatross, Phoebetria fusca (A)
- Light-mantled albatross, Phoebetria palpebrata
- Royal albatross, Diomedea epomophora
- Wandering albatross, Diomedea exulans

== Southern storm-petrels ==
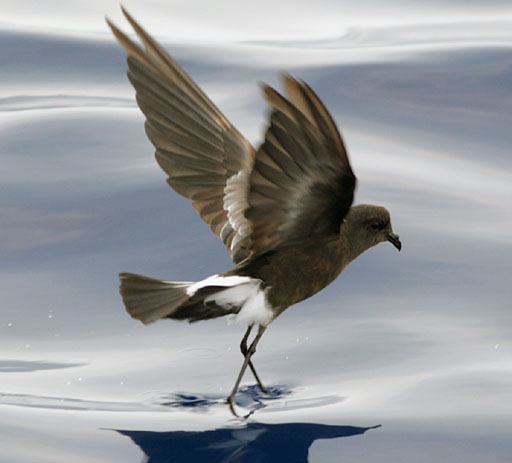
Wilson's storm-petrel, Oceanites oceanicus

Order: Procellariiformes Family: Oceanitidae

The southern storm-petrels are relatives of the petrels and are the smallest seabirds. They feed on planktonic crustaceans and small fish picked from the surface, typically while hovering. The flight is fluttering and sometimes bat-like.

- Wilson's storm-petrel, Oceanites oceanicus
- Gray-backed storm-petrel, Garrodia nereis (A)
- Black-bellied storm-petrel, Fregetta tropica

== Shearwaters and petrels ==
Order: Procellariiformes Family: Procellariidae

The procellariids are the main group of medium-sized "true petrels", characterised by united nostrils with medium septum and a long outer functional primary.

- Southern giant-petrel, Macronectes giganteus
- Northern giant-petrel, Macronectes halli
- Southern fulmar, Fulmarus glacialoides
- Antarctic petrel, Thalassoica antarctica
- Cape petrel, Daption capense
- Snow petrel, Pagodroma nivea
- Kerguelen petrel, Aphrodroma brevirostris
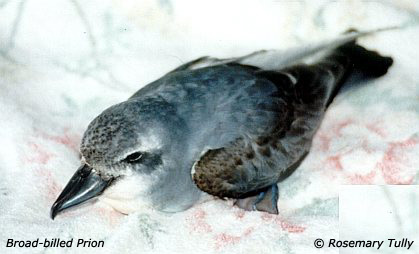
  Broad-billed prion, Pachyptila vittata
- Soft-plumaged petrel, Pterodroma mollis
- White-headed petrel, Pterodroma lessonii
- Mottled petrel, Pterodroma inexpectata
- Atlantic petrel, Pterodroma incerta (A)
- Blue petrel, Halobaena caerulea
- Fairy prion, Pachyptila turtur (A)
- Broad-billed prion, Pachyptila vittata (A)
- Salvin's prion, Pachyptila salvini (A)
- Antarctic prion, Pachyptila desolata
- Slender-billed prion, Pachyptila belcheri
- Gray petrel, Procellaria cinerea
- White-chinned petrel, Procellaria aequinoctialis
- Great shearwater, Ardenna gravis (A)
- Sooty shearwater, Ardenna grisea
- Short-tailed shearwater, Ardenna tenuirostris
- South Georgia diving-petrel, Pelecanoides georgicus (A)

== Cormorants and shags ==
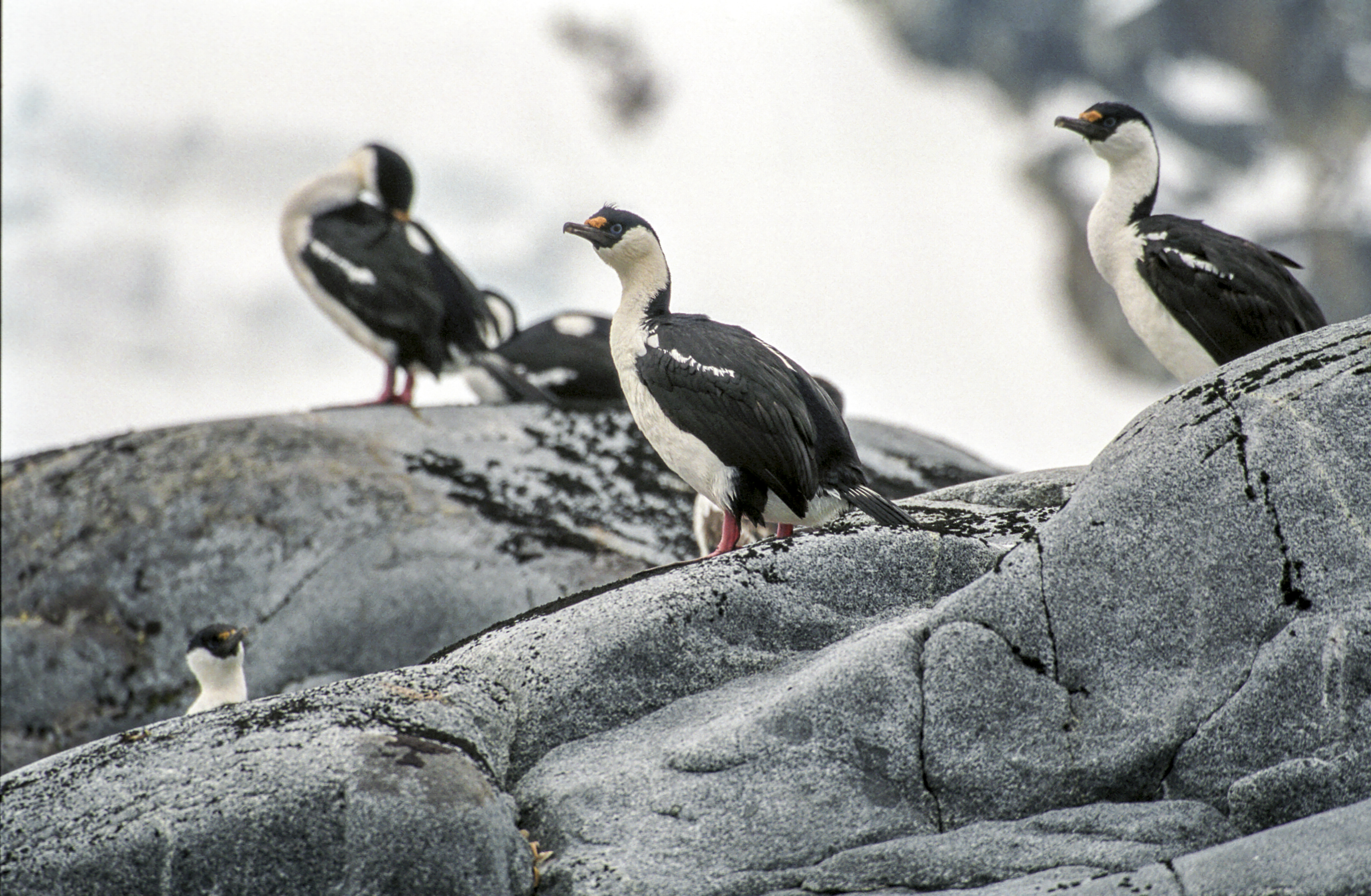
Antarctic shag, Phalacrocorax bransfieldensis

Order: Suliformes Family: Phalacrocoracidae

Phalacrocoracidae is a family of medium to large coastal, fish-eating seabirds that includes cormorants and shags. Plumage colouration varies, with the majority having mainly dark plumage, some species being black-and-white and a few being colourful.

- South Georgia shag, Leucocarbo georgianus
- Antarctic shag, Leucocarbo bransfieldensis

== Herons, egrets, and bitterns ==
Order: Pelecaniformes Family: Ardeidae

The family Ardeidae contains the bitterns, herons and egrets. Herons and egrets are medium to large wading birds with long necks and legs. Bitterns tend to be shorter necked and more wary. Members of Ardeidae fly with their necks retracted, unlike other long-necked birds such as storks, ibises and spoonbills.

- Cattle egret, Bubulcus ibis (A)

== Barn-owls ==
Order: Strigiformes Family: Tytonidae

Barn-owls are medium to large owls with large heads and characteristic heart-shaped faces. They have long strong legs with powerful talons.

- Barn owl, Tyto alba (A)

== See also ==
- List of birds
- Lists of birds by region
- List of birds of Australia, New Zealand and Antarctica
