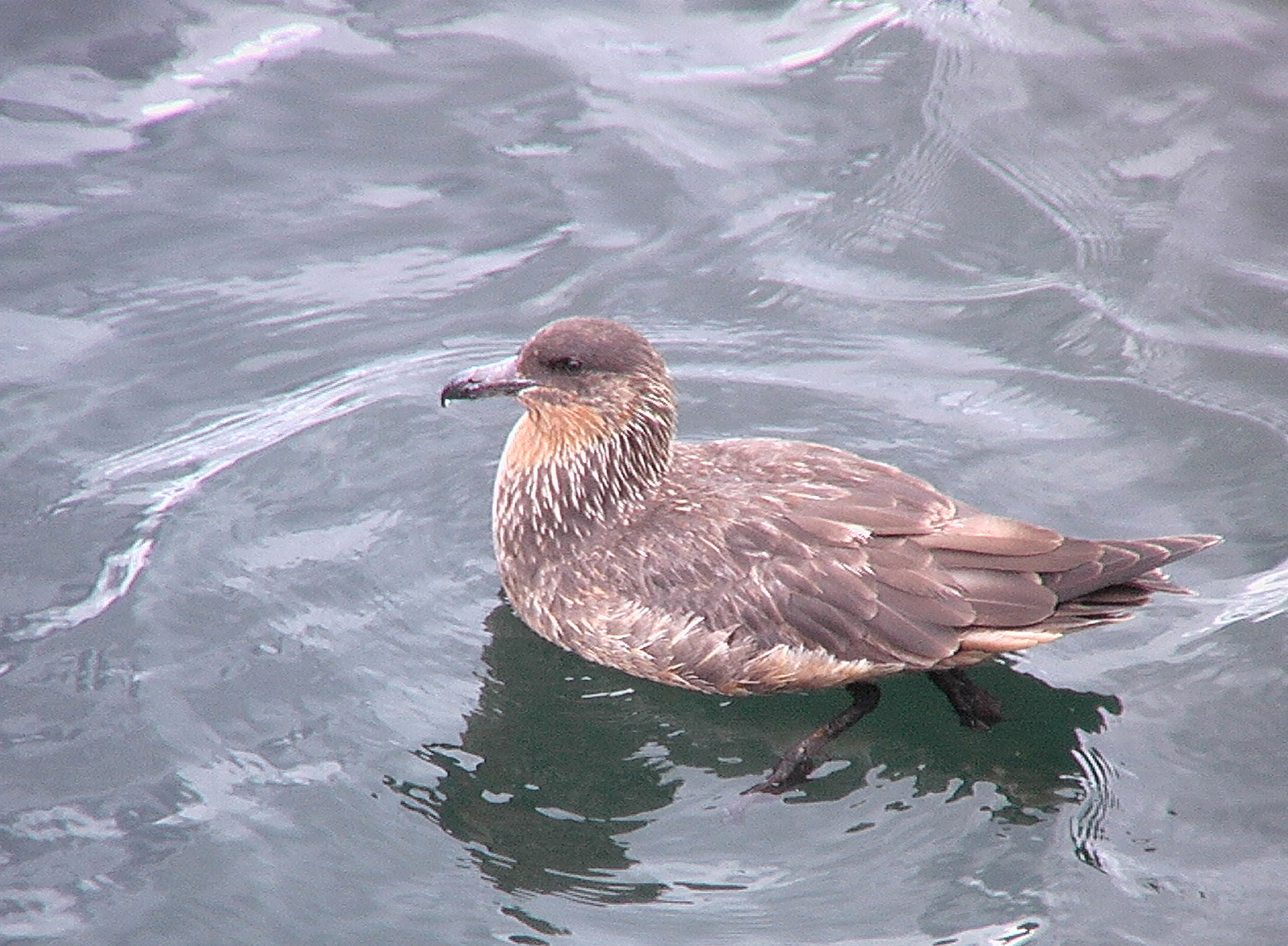

Conservation status
- Least Concern (IUCN 3.1)

Scientific classification
- Kingdom: Animalia
- Phylum: Chordata
- Class: Aves
- Order: Charadriiformes
- Family: Stercorariidae
- Genus: Stercorarius
- Species: S. chilensis

Binomial name
- Stercorarius chilensis Bonaparte, 1857

Synonyms
- Catharacta chilensis

= Chilean skua =

Species of bird

The Chilean skua, also known as the cinnamon skua (Stercorarius chilensis), is a large predatory seabird, which breeds in Argentina and Chile, but ranges as far north as Brazil and Peru when not breeding. A relatively distinctive skua, it has a dark cap that contrasts with its cinnamon throat and lower face. Hybrids with the Falkland skua are known from southern Argentina.

Chilean skuas feed on fish and other seabirds, as well as scraps, and carrion. They breed in colonies during the Southern Hemisphere summer.

Overall, little is known about this South American species and what is known largely comes from descriptive studies scattered through time and concentrated at a few select breeding colonies.

== Taxonomy ==
The Chilean skua is part of Charadriiformes, a large order of seabirds that includes gulls, terns, jaegers, skuas, and auks. It is a member of the small Stercorariidae family, which comprises jaegers and skuas. There is some disagreement regarding the genus-level classification of this species. It was previously classified into Catharacta along with the Falkland skua and the south polar skua, but all skuas have now been merged into the larger Stercorarius genus.

There are some reports of hybridization between the Chilean and Falkland skuas where their breeding ranges overlap.

== Description ==
Chilean skuas tend to be dark on their back, flanks, and cheeks, and uniformly light underneath. The dark colour usually extends from their back across the upper chest to form a pectoral collar. The underside of their wings is characteristically cinnamon-coloured, but this colour can be rather dull in some individuals. All adults have a distinctive dark cap and prominent pale gold streaking on the face and neck. They have black legs, brown irises, and a small, bluish bill with a dark tip. Their wingspan is 130 to 138 cm (51 to 54 in).

Juveniles tend to be brighter-colored than the adults, with no light streaking. They are also strongly capped but often lack the pectoral collar found in older birds.

The Chilean skua could be confused with the Falkland skua, but it appears much more slender and compact in flight, with distinctive red coloration and white crescents on the wings.

== Habitat and distribution ==
The Chilean skua is endemic to South America, occupying coastal habitats from central Peru to northern Argentina. It nests between southern Chile and Cape Horn, Argentina, but its wintering range extends into Brazil, where it exploits the tropical coastal waters. In 2009, one individual was exceptionally sighted on Inaccessible Island, which is part of the African region of the southern Atlantic.

In September 2026, a juvenile Chilean Skua was sighted off the coast of New Hampshire and Maine, the first record for the Northern Hemisphere.

Breeding adults show a preference for sandy coastline with beached kelp and freshwater streams. This species is also known for its association with southern hake fisheries in the fjords and channels of southern Chile.

In September 2026, a juvenile was sighted off the coast of New Hampshire and Maine, the first individual recorded in the Northern Hemisphere.

== Behaviour ==
=== Vocalizations ===
Very little information is available on the vocalizations of the Chilean skua. At the breeding colony, it performs a long-call which consists of ten to twelve short nasal barks. This call is seemingly unrelated to chick-rearing and has been described as almost goose-like due to its distinctly deep and hoarse nature. Other calls may include short guttural grunts.

=== Diet ===
The diet of the Chilean skua is not well described, but they appear to mainly be opportunistic scavengers. They have been seen scavenging penguin meat, fish, and dumpster food, and they are known to steal fish from other seabirds. They predate imperial cormorants, sooty shearwaters, blue petrels, and the eggs and chicks of the black-browed albatross and grey-headed albatross. They are also known to feed on white-chinned petrels, Magellanic diving petrels, cormorants, geese, nutria, seals, crustaceans, and barnacles.

=== Reproduction ===
From November to February or March, Chilean skuas aggregate into breeding colonies in sandy coastal habitat. Breeding adults tend to concentrate in the center of the colony, and non-breeding adults and subadults distribute themselves on the fringes. Nesting parents attack intruders from above; this display can involve the discharge of excrements onto the perceived threat. If the intruder is another member of the same species, it will fake a leg injury to show its submission towards the attacking bird. Aggression towards neighbours is only observed in non-dense breeding colonies.

There are usually two eggs in a clutch, and these are incubated for 28 to 32 days.

In the absence of their parents, chicks will remain motionless at their nest site and camouflage themselves in the sand among patches of giant kelp. In the presence of their parents, they will venture a bit further from the nest but will walk back with their wings folded against their body and their head under their shoulders at the first sign of a threat.

== Notes ==
- Avibase - the world bird database
