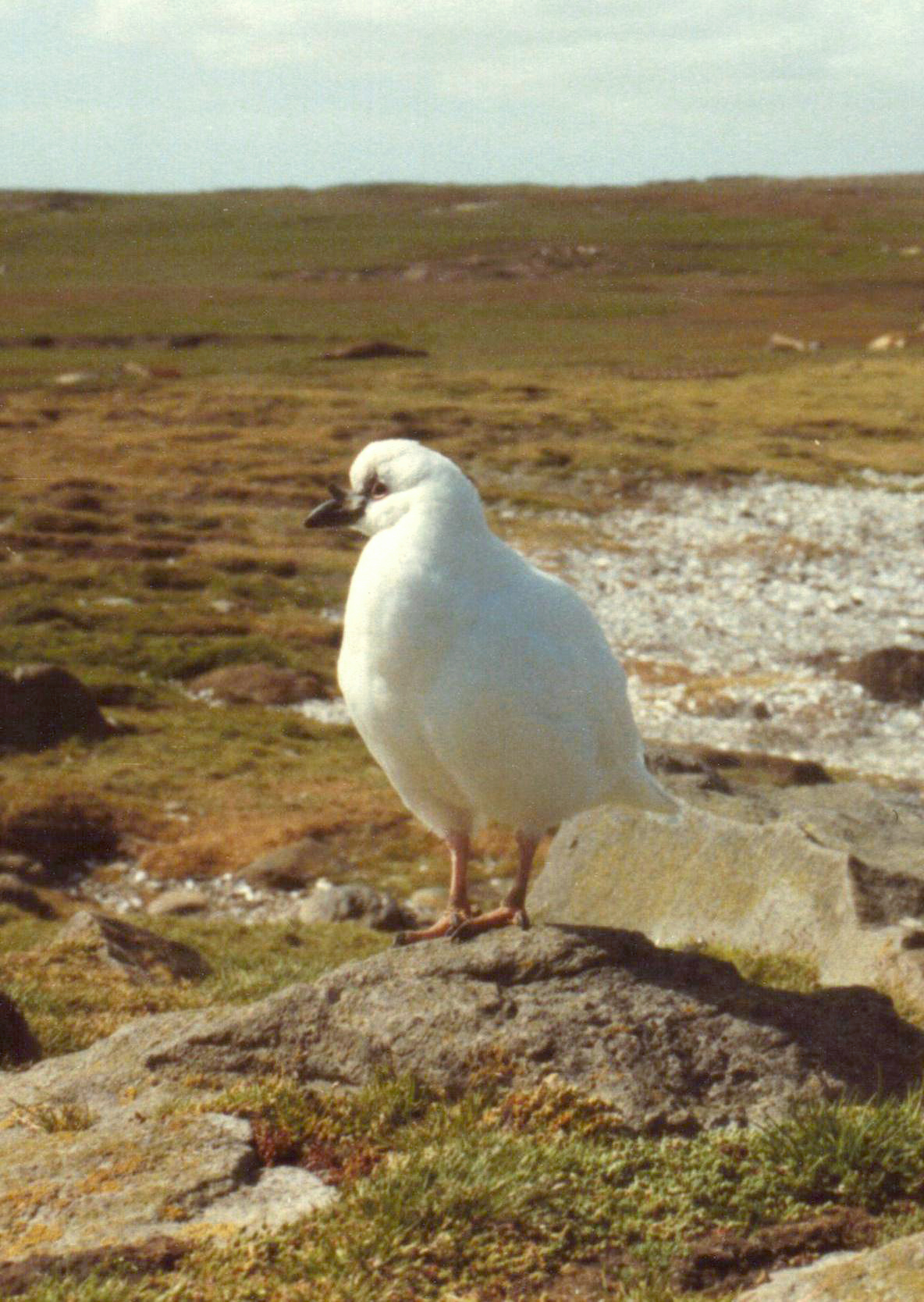

Conservation status
- Least Concern (IUCN 3.1)

Scientific classification
- Kingdom: Animalia
- Phylum: Chordata
- Class: Aves
- Order: Charadriiformes
- Family: Chionidae
- Genus: Chionis
- Species: C. minor

Binomial name
- Chionis minor Hartlaub, 1841

= Black-faced sheathbill =

Species of bird

The black-faced sheathbill (Chionis minor), also called the lesser sheathbill or paddy bird, is one of only two species of sheathbills, aberrant shorebirds which are terrestrial (land) scavengers of subantarctic islands.

== Description ==
They are dumpy, short-necked, pigeon-like birds with white plumage, black bills, caruncles and facial skin. This species measures 38–41 cm (15–16 in) in length, 74–79 cm (29–31 in) in wingspan and weighs 460–730 g (1.01–1.61 lb), with males being slightly larger than females.

== Distribution ==
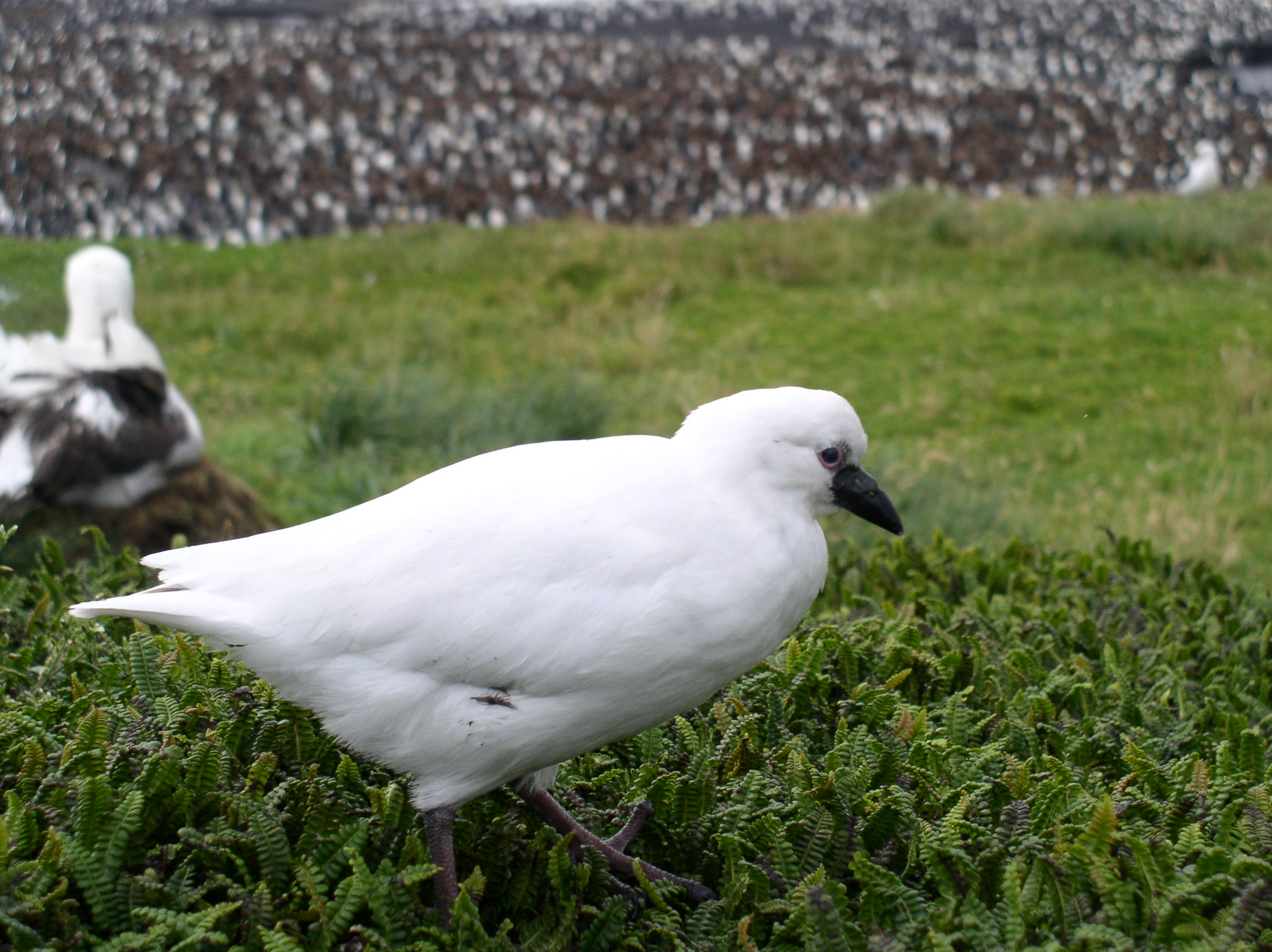
The darker-legged Crozet Islands subspecies.

Restricted to subantarctic islands in the southern Indian Ocean: the South African territory of the Prince Edward Islands, the French territories of the Crozet Islands and Kerguelen Islands, and the Australian territory of Heard Island. The race C. m. nasicornis is endemic to Heard Island, while the race C. m. marionesis is endemic to the Prince Edward Islands.

== Habitat ==
Coastlines and intertidal zones of subantarctic islands, especially around seabird and seal colonies, as well as the vicinity of human habitation.

== Food ==
Sheathbills are opportunistic omnivores, predators and scavengers, feeding on strandline debris, algae and other vegetation, as well as on invertebrates, fish, seabird eggs and chicks, seal milk, blood, placentas, carrion, faeces, rodents and human refuse.

== Voice ==
Loud, high-pitched, strident and staccato calls.

== Breeding ==
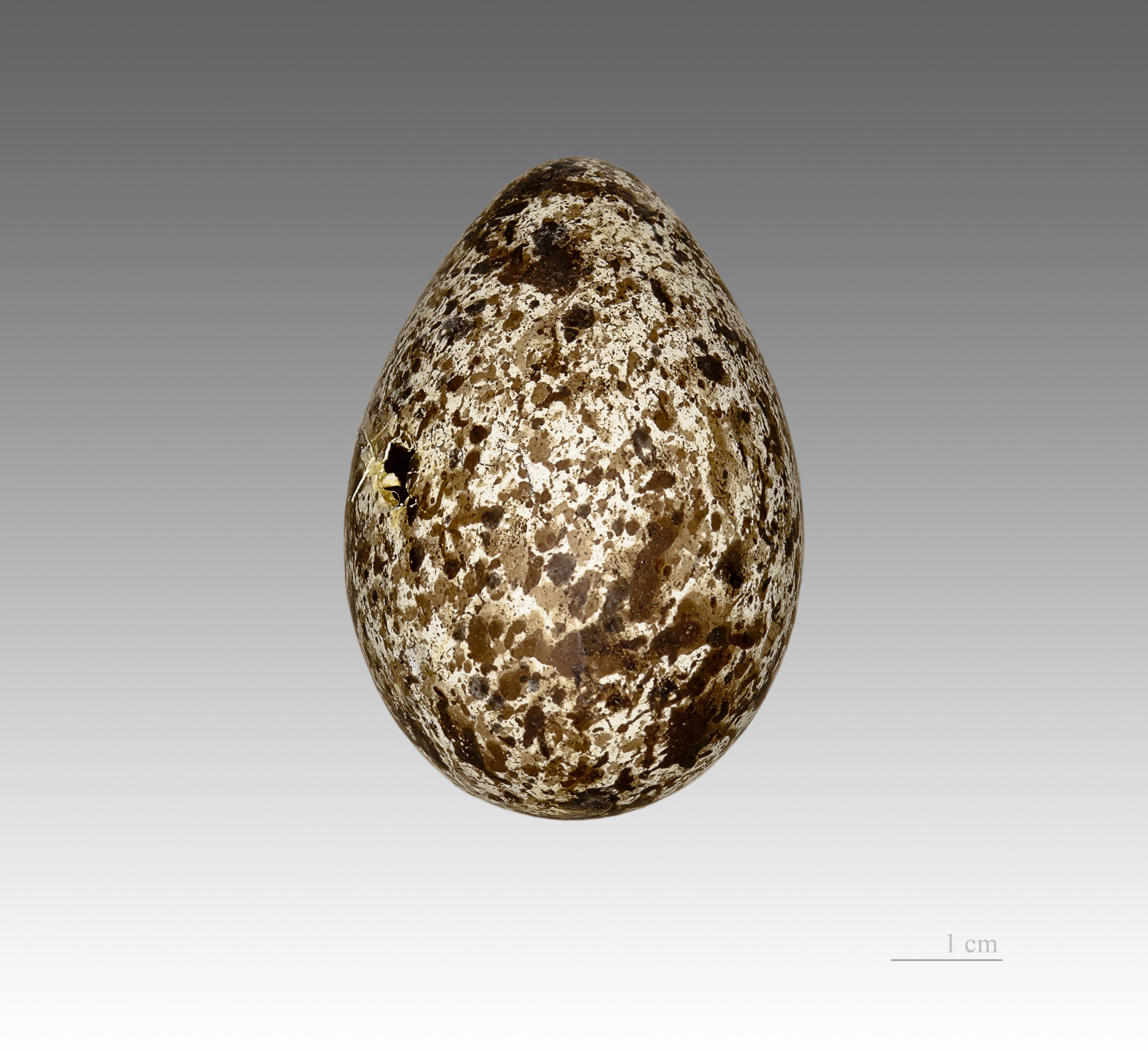
Egg of Chionis minor

Nests in crevices, caves and under boulders on untidy piles of vegetation and debris from seabird and seal colonies. Clutch usually 2–3 creamy-white eggs, blotched or speckled brown. Incubation period c.30 days. Young semi-precocial and nidicolous; fledging c.50 days after hatching; breeding at 3–5 years.

== Conservation ==
At risk from scavenging toxic wastes and from introduced predators such as feral cats, but large, scattered range with no evidence of significant overall population decline leads to conservation status assessment of Least Concern.
