= Southern hake =

Southern hake is a common name for several fishes and may refer to:

- Merluccius australis, native to the south Pacific Ocean
- Urophycis floridana, native to the north Atlantic Ocean
