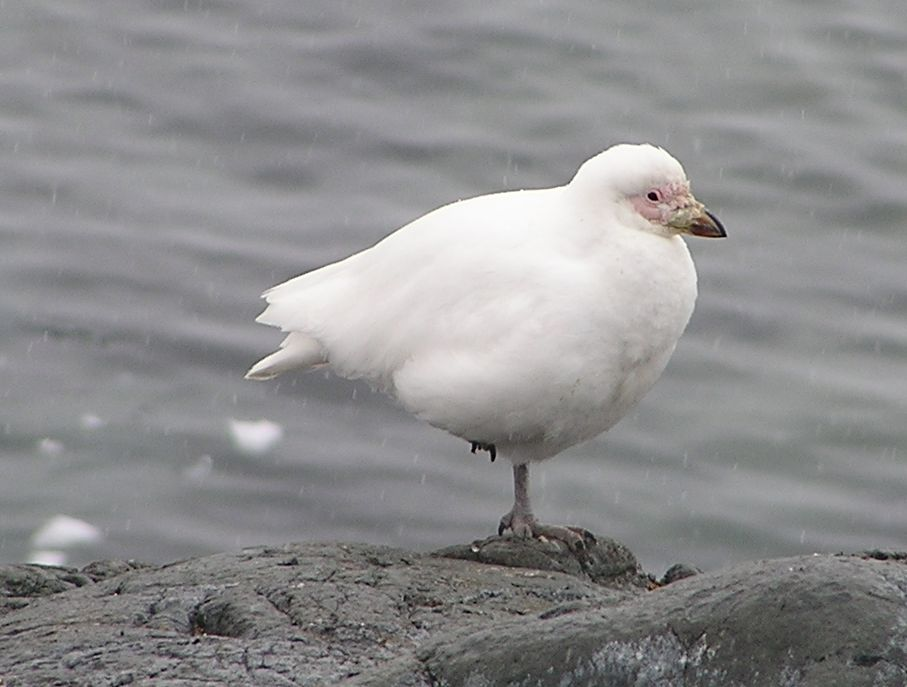
- Snowy sheathbill (C. albus)

Scientific classification
- Kingdom: Animalia
- Phylum: Chordata
- Class: Aves
- Order: Charadriiformes
- Suborder: Charadrii
- Family: Chionidae; Bonaparte, 1832
- Genus: Chionis; J. R. Forster, 1788

Type species
- Vaginalis alba Gmelin, JF, 1789

Species
- Chionis albus Chionis minor

= Sheathbill =

Sheathbills

Genus of birds

The sheathbills (Chionis) is a genus of birds in the monotypic family Chionidae of the wader order Charadriiformes; the family consists of one genus with two species. They breed on subantarctic islands and the Antarctic Peninsula, and the snowy sheathbill migrates to the Falkland Islands and coastal southern South America in the southern winter; they are the only bird family endemic as breeders to the Antarctic region. They are also the only Antarctic birds without webbed feet.

== Taxonomy ==
The genus Chionis was introduced in 1788 by the German naturalist Johann Reinhold Forster. The type species is the snowy sheathbill, Chionis albus. The genus name is from the Ancient Greek khiōn meaning snow.

Genetic studies of the order Charadriiformes show the sheathbills to be a sister group of the thick-knees of the family Burhinidae. These two groups together are in turn a sister group to the Recurvirostridae-Haematopodidae and Charadriidae. Recent research on the Magellanic plover (Pluvianellus socialis) of southern South America has indicated it too may be classified within the sheathbill family.

== Description ==
Sheathbills have white plumage including a thick layer of down, with only the face and leg colours distinguishing the two species. They appear plump and dove-like, but are believed to be similar to the ancestors of the modern gulls and terns. There is a rudimentary spur on the "wrist" or carpal joint, as in plovers. The skin around the eye is bare, as is the skin above the bill, which has carbuncular swellings. They derive their English common name from the horny sheath (rhamphotheca) which partially covers the upper mandible of their stout bills. They are commonly known in the Antarctic as "Mutts" because of their call which is a soft "Mutt, mutt, mutt".

The two species are:

Genus Chionis – J.R. Forster, 1788 – two species
Common name	Scientific name and subspecies	Range	Size and ecology	IUCN status and estimated population
snowy sheathbill	Chionis albus (Gmelin, JF, 1789)	Antarctica, the Scotia Arc, the South Orkneys, and South Georgia	Size: Habitat: Diet:	LC
black-faced sheathbill	Chionis minor Hartlaub, 1841	South African territory of the Prince Edward Islands, the French territories of the Crozet Islands and Kerguelen Islands, and the Australian territory of Heard Island.	Size: Habitat: Diet:	LC

== Behaviour ==
Sheathbills habitually walk on the ground, somewhat like rails. They fly only when alarmed or in migration, looking like pigeons.

=== Food and feeding ===
The sheathbills are scavengers and opportunistic feeders, consuming invertebrates, faeces, and carrion—including the afterbirth of seals and their stillborn pups—between the tidelines. They also take chicks and eggs from penguins and cormorants.

The bird has also been observed to directly pilfer milk from the teats of elephant seals.

=== Breeding ===
During the penguin breeding season, which is also the sheathbill breeding season, pairs of sheathbills in penguin colonies maintain territories covering a number of penguin nests. Two mated sheathbills often work together to harass adult penguins, nimbly avoiding their attempts to peck; they gain access to the eggs or chicks or steal the krill that the adult penguins regurgitate to feed their chicks. Near the few human settlements of the region, they boldly forage for offal. Because of this diet, they spend a good deal of time cleaning themselves.

They lay two or three blotchy white eggs in crevices or rock cavities. The nests are lined messily with seaweed, stones, feathers, guano, bones, and occasionally plastic trash; even dead chicks may not be removed. Incubation lasts 28 to 32 days, and the young fledge 50 to 60 days later.
