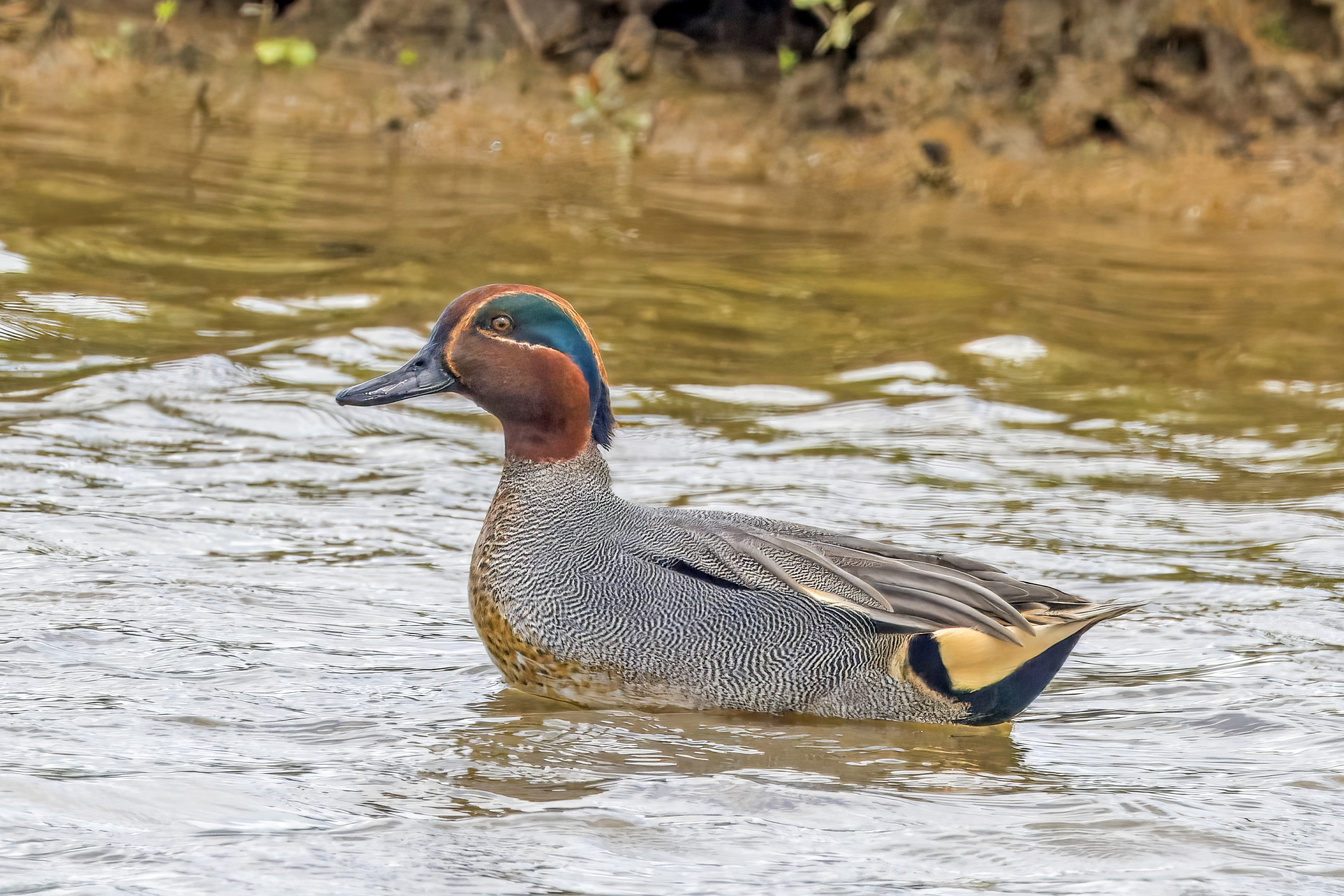
- Anas crecca crecca male, Taiwan Calls

Conservation status
- Least Concern (IUCN 3.1)

Scientific classification
- Kingdom: Animalia
- Phylum: Chordata
- Class: Aves
- Order: Anseriformes
- Family: Anatidae
- Genus: Anas
- Species: A. crecca

Binomial name
- Anas crecca Linnaeus, 1758
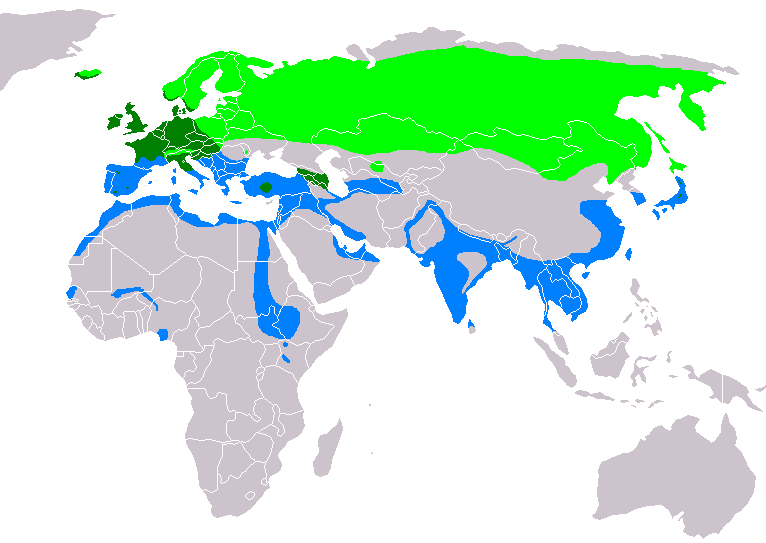
- Distribution map light green : nesting area blue : wintering area dark green : resident all year

Synonyms
- Anas crecca crecca Linnaeus, 1758; Anas crecca nimia Friedmann, 1948

= Eurasian teal =

Species of bird (duck)

The Eurasian teal (Anas crecca), common teal, or Eurasian green-winged teal is a common and widespread duck that breeds in temperate Eurosiberia and migrates south in winter. The Eurasian teal is often called simply the teal due to being the only one of these small dabbling ducks in much of its range. The bird gives its name to the blue-green colour teal.

It is a highly gregarious duck outside the breeding season and can form large flocks. It is commonly found in sheltered wetlands and feeds on seeds and aquatic invertebrates. The North American green-winged teal (A. carolinensis) was formerly (and sometimes is still) considered a subspecies of A. crecca.

== Taxonomy ==
The Eurasian teal belongs to the "true" teals, a group of small Anas dabbling ducks closely related to the mallard (A. platyrhynchos) and its relatives; that latter group in fact seems to have evolved from a true teal. It forms a superspecies with the green-winged teal and the speckled teal (A. flavirostris). A formerly proposed subspecies, A. c. nimia, from the Aleutian Islands, differs only in slightly larger size; it is no longer considered distinct.

Whether the Eurasian and green-winged teals are to be treated as one or two species is still being reviewed by the American Ornithologists' Union, while the International Union for Conservation of Nature and BirdLife International now separate them. Despite the almost identical and highly apomorphic breeding plumage of their males, which continues to puzzle scientists, they are currently considered distinct species, as indicated by a wealth of behavioural, morphological, and molecular data.

The Eurasian teal was first scientifically named by Carl Linnaeus in his 1758 edition of Systema naturae. His Latin description reads: [Anas] macula alarum viridi, linea alba supra infraque oculos – "a duck with green speculum, a white line above and below the eyes" – and his primary reference was the bird's description in his earlier work Fauna Svecica. The description he used in Systema Naturae was the name under which the bird went in the Fauna Svecica, demonstrating the value of his new binomial nomenclature by compressing the long-winded names formerly used in biological classification into much simpler scientific names like Anas crecca. Linnaeus also noted in his description that earlier authors had already written about the Eurasan teal at length; Conrad Gessner had described it in the Historiae animalium as the anas parva ("small duck") among his querquedulae ("teals"); Ulisse Aldrovandi had called it phascade or querquedula minor ("lesser teal"), and was duly referenced by Francis Willughby, who named the species querquedula secunda Aldrovandi ("the second teal of Aldrovandi"). (Note: Aldrovandi's "first teal" was the Garganey, which was subsequently scientifically described as Anas querquedula ("teal-duck").) John Ray may be credited with formally introducing the name "common teal", while Eleazar Albin called it simply "the teal". As regards the type locality Linnaeus simply remarked that it inhabits freshwater ecosystems in Europe.

The scientific name is from Latin Anas, "duck", and kricka, the Swedish name for this species. The specific name of Linnaeus is thus onomatopoetic, the "duck that says cryc"; the common names in Norwegian krikkand, Danish krikand, and German Krickente mean the same, referring to the male's characteristic call which was already discussed by Linnaeus' sources.

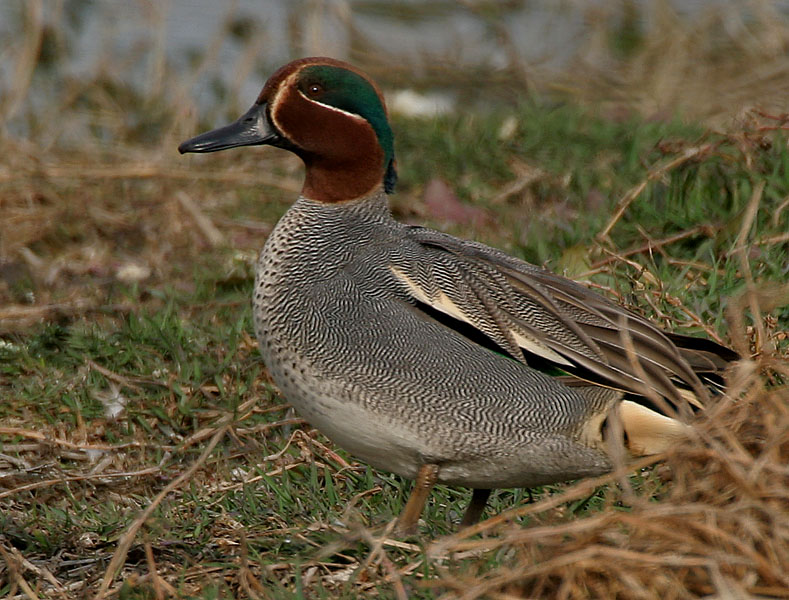
A. crecca drake in breeding plumage, showing horizontal white stripe from shoulder

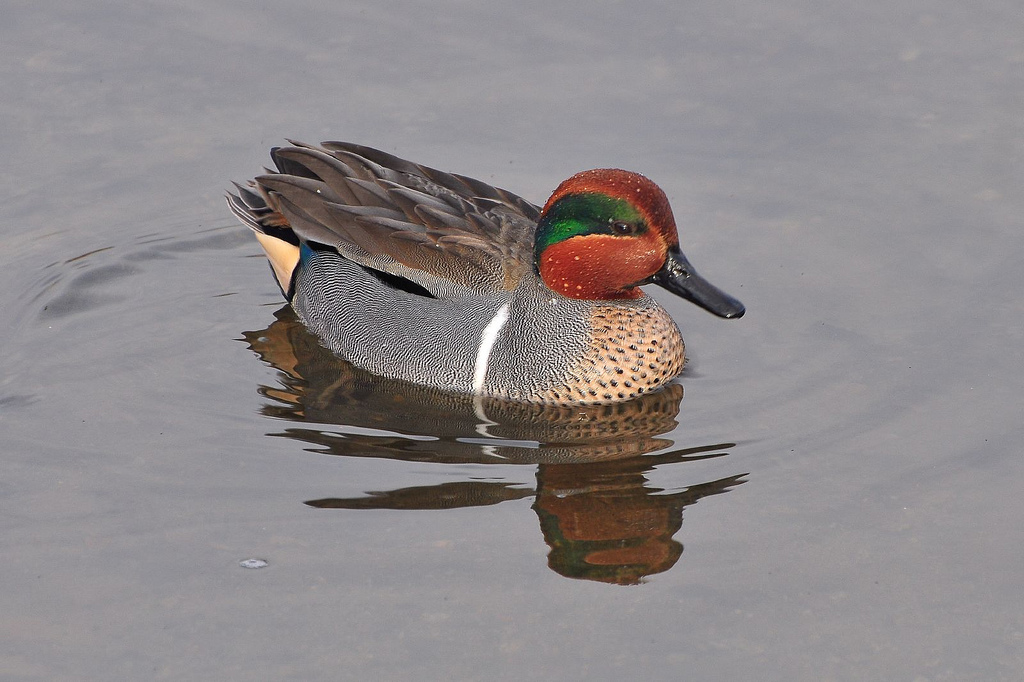
A. carolinensis (A. crecca carolinensis) drake in breeding plumage, showing vertical white stripe from shoulder

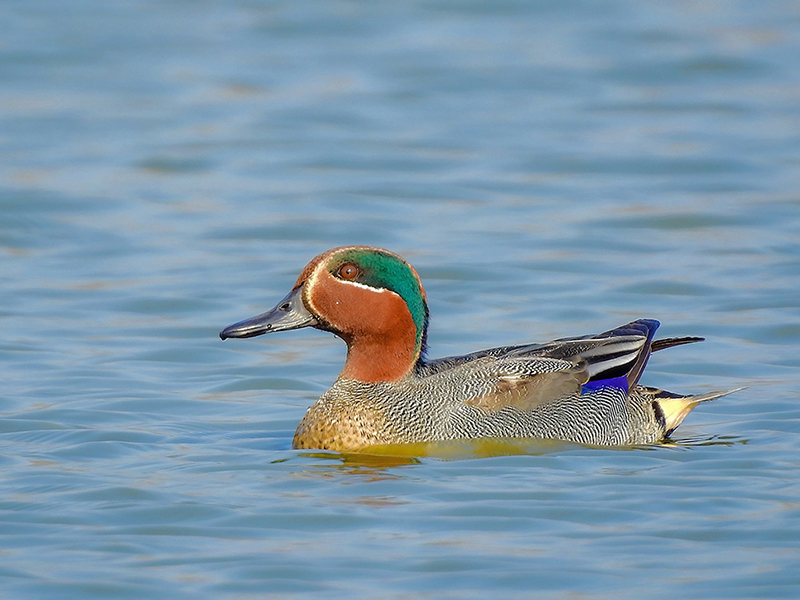
Wintering male from Maharashtra, India

== Description ==
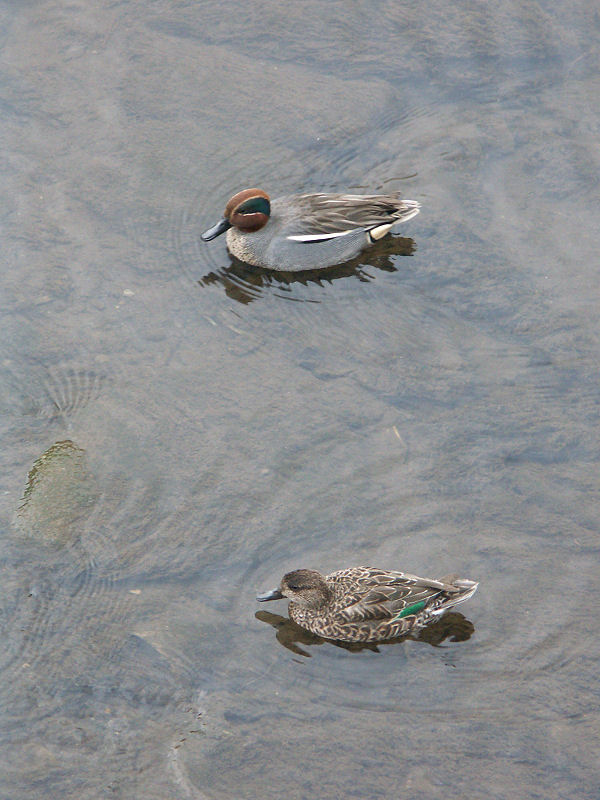
Male (top) in breeding plumage and female. The male has the wide white wing stripe and conspicuous face markings, which gave the colour teal its name.

The Eurasian teal is one of the smallest extant dabbling ducks at 34–43 cm (13–17 in) length and with an average weight of 360 g (13 oz) in drake (males) and 340 g (12 oz) in hens (females). The wings are 17.5–20.4 cm (6.9–8.0 in) long, yielding a wingspan of 53–59 cm (21–23 in). The bill measures 3.2–4 cm (1.3–1.6 in) in length, and the tarsus 2.8–3.4 cm (1.1–1.3 in).

From a distance, the drakes in breeding plumage appear grey, with a dark head, a yellowish behind, and a white stripe running along the flanks. Their head and upper neck is chestnut, with a wide and iridescent dark green patch of half-moon or teardrop-shape that starts immediately before the eye and arcs to the upper hindneck. The patch is bordered with thin yellowish-white lines, and a single line of that colour extends from the patch's forward end, curving along the base of the bill. The breast is buff with small round brown spots. The centre of the belly is white, and the rest of the body plumage is mostly white with thin and dense blackish vermiculations, appearing medium grey even at a short distance. The outer scapular feathers are white, with a black border to the outer vanes, and form the white side-stripe when the bird is in resting position. The primary remiges are dark greyish brown; the speculum feathers are iridescent blackish-green with white tips, and form the speculum together with the yellowish-white tips of the larger upperwing coverts (which are otherwise grey). The underwing is whitish, with grey remiges, dense dark spotting on the inner coverts and a dark leading edge. The tail and tail coverts are black, with a bright yellowish-buff triangular patch in the centre of the coverts at each side.

In non-breeding (eclipse) plumage, the drake looks more like the duck (female); it is more uniform in colour, with a dark head and vestigial facial markings. The duck itself is yellowish-brown, somewhat darker on wings and back. It has a dark greyish-brown upper head, hindneck, eyestripe and feather pattern. The pattern is dense short streaks on the head and neck, and scaly spots on the rest of the body; overall they look much like a tiny mallard (A. platyrhynchos) duck when at rest. The wings are coloured similar to the drake's, but with brown instead of grey upperwing coverts that have less wide tips, and wider tips of the speculum feathers. The duck's rectrices have yellowish-white tips; the midbelly is whitish with some dark streaking.

Immatures are coloured much like adult females, but have a stronger pattern. The downy young are coloured like in other dabbling ducks: brown above and yellow below, with a yellow supercilium. They are recognisable by their tiny size however, weighing just 15 g (0.53 oz) at hatching.

The drake's bill is dark grey, in eclipse plumage often with some light greenish or brownish hue at the base. The bill of females and immatures is pinkish or yellowish at the base, becoming dark grey towards the tip; the grey expands basewards as the birds age. The feet are dark grey in males, and greyish-olive or greyish-brown in females and immatures. The iris is always brown.

The moult is during the summer. Males in eclipse resemble females, but with darker upperparts and a grey bill. The flight feathers are moulted simultaneously and birds are flightless for up to 4 weeks.

This species is known to be louder than others. The male whistles resemble a "cryc" or "creelycc." The female produces a "keh" or "neeh" quack.

Males in breeding plumage are distinguished from green-winged teal by the horizontal white scapular stripe, the lack of a vertical white bar on the breast sides, and the more conspicuous light outlines on the face patch, which are indistinct in the green-winged teal drake. Males in eclipse plumage, females and immatures are best recognised by their small size, calls, and the speculum; they are hard to tell apart from the green-winged teal however.

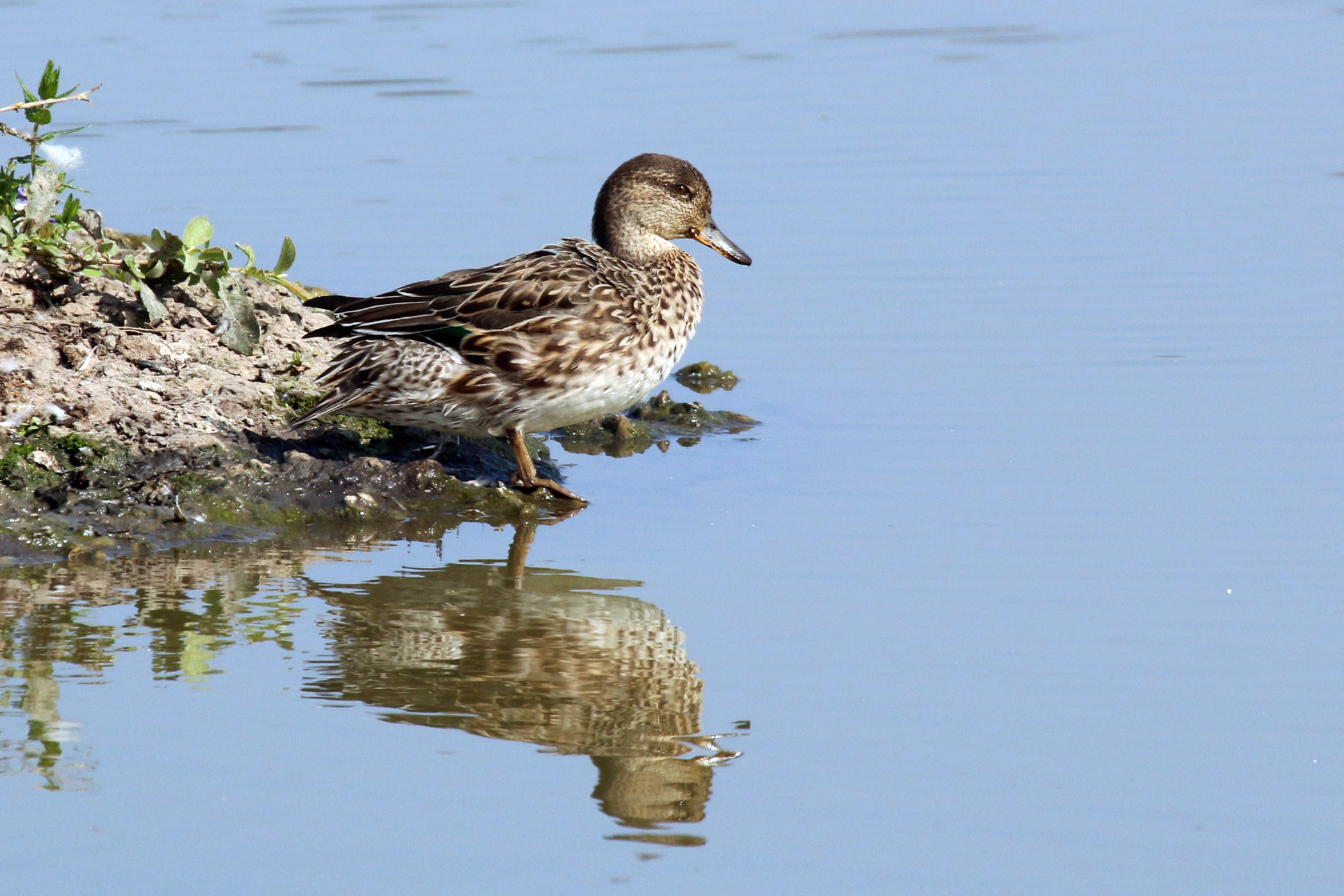
Female, WWT Slimbridge in Gloucestershire, England

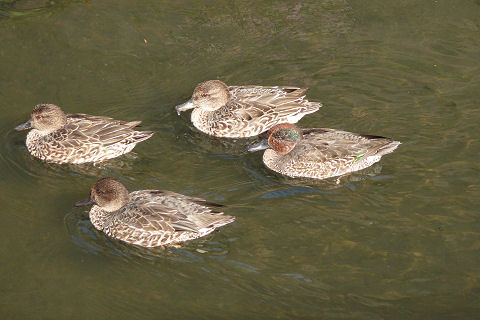
Drake in eclipse plumage (rightmost bird), female and young

== Distribution and habitat ==
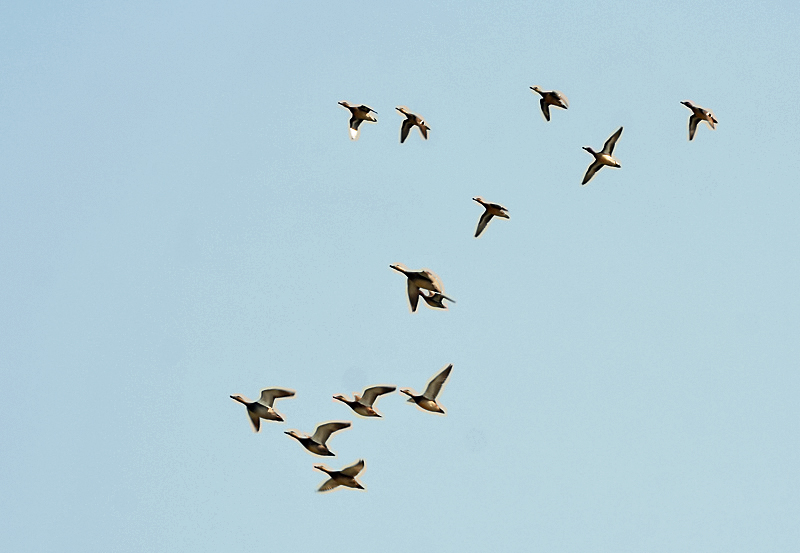
Wintering birds at Purbasthali, Burdwan District of West Bengal, India

The Eurasian teal breeds across the Palearctic and mostly winters well south of its breeding range. However, in the milder climate of temperate Europe, the summer and winter ranges overlap. For example, in the United Kingdom and Ireland a small summer population breeds, but far greater numbers of Siberian birds arrive in winter. In the Caucasus region, western Asia Minor, along the northern shores of the Black Sea, and even on the south coast of Iceland and on the Vestmannaeyjar, the species can be encountered all year, too.

In winter, there are high densities around the Mediterranean, including the entire Iberian Peninsula, and extending west to Mauretania; on Japan and Taiwan; as well as in South Asia. Other important wintering locations include almost the entire length of the Nile Valley, the Near East and Persian Gulf region, the mountain ranges of northern Iran and South Korea, and continental East and Southeast Asia. More isolated wintering grounds are Lake Victoria, the Senegal River estuary, the swamps of the upper Congo River, the inland and sea deltas of the Niger River, and the central Indus River valley. Vagrants have been seen in inland Zaire, Malaysia, on Greenland, and on the Marianas, Palau, and Yap in Micronesia; they are regularly recorded on the North American coasts south to California and South Carolina, including annual sightings on the island of Newfoundland.

From tracking wintering teal in Italy, most individuals departed the wintering grounds between mid-February and March, using the Black Sea-Mediterranean flyway to reach their breeding grounds, from central Europe to east of the Urals, by May. This slow migration is due to long stopovers near the start of migration, mainly in south-eastern Europe.

Altogether, the Eurasian teal is much less common than its American counterpart, though still very plentiful. Its numbers are mainly assessed by counts of wintering birds; some 750,000 are recorded annually around the Mediterranean and Black Seas, 250,000 in temperate western Europe, and more than 110,000 in Japan. In 1990 and 1991, a more detailed census was undertaken, yielding over 287,000 birds wintering in Iran, some 109,000 in Pakistan, some 37,000 in India, 28,000 in Israel, over 14,000 in Turkmenistan and almost 12,000 in Taiwan. It appears to be holding its own currently, with its slow decline of maybe 1–2% annually in the 1990s, presumably mainly due to drainage and pollution of wetlands, not warranting action other than continuing to monitor the population and possibly providing better protection for habitat on the wintering grounds. The IUCN and BirdLife International classify the Eurasian teal as a species of Least Concern, unchanged from their assessment before the split of the more numerous A. carolinensis.

The Eurasian teal is one of the species to which the Agreement on the Conservation of African-Eurasian Migratory Waterbirds (AEWA) applies.

== Behaviour ==
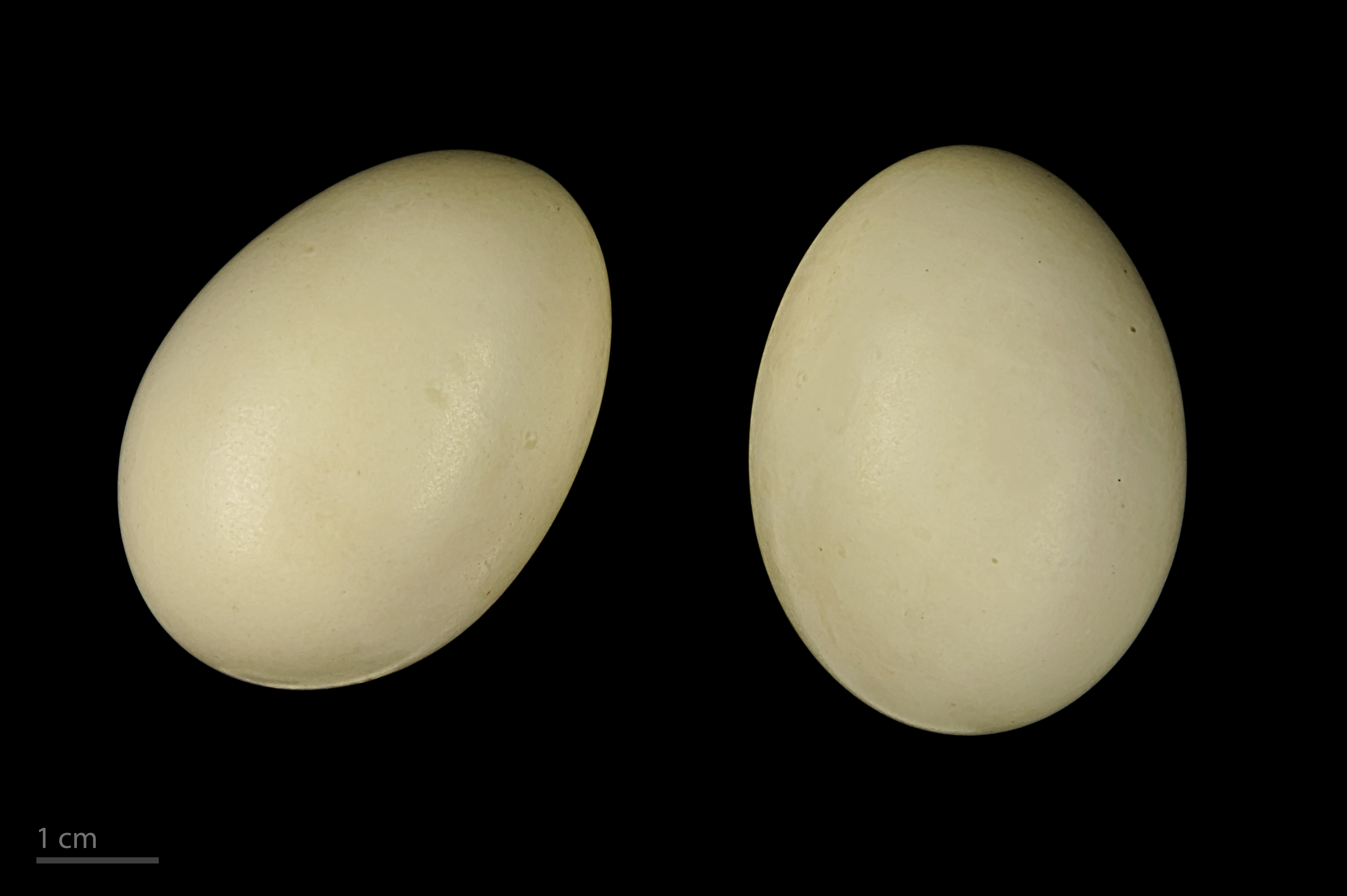
Eggs

This dabbling duck is highly gregarious outside of the breeding season and will form large flocks. In flight, the fast, twisting flocks resemble waders; despite its short legs, it is also rather nimble on the ground by ducks' standards. In the breeding season, it is a common inhabitant of sheltered freshwater wetlands with some tall vegetation, such as taiga bogs or small lakes and ponds with extensive reedbeds. In winter, it is often seen in brackish waters and even in sheltered inlets and lagoons along the seashore.

The Eurasian teal usually feeds by dabbling, upending or grazing; it may submerge its head and on occasion even dive to reach food. In the breeding season it eats mainly aquatic invertebrates, such as crustaceans, insects and their larvae, molluscs and worms. In winter, it shifts to a largely granivorous diet, feeding on seeds of aquatic plants and grasses, including sedges and grains. Diurnal throughout the breeding season, in winter they are often crepuscular or even nocturnal feeders.

It nests on the ground, near water and under cover. The pairs form in the winter quarters and arrive on the breeding grounds together, starting about March. The breeding starts some weeks thereafter, not until May in the most northernly locations. The nest is a deep hollow lined with dry leaves and down feathers, built in dense vegetation near water. After the females have started laying, the males leave them and move away for shorter or longer distances, assembling in flocks on particular lakes where they moult into eclipse plumage; they will usually encounter their offspring only in winter quarters. The clutch may consist of 5–16 eggs, but usually numbers 8–11; they are incubated for 21–23 days. The young leave the nest soon after hatching and are attended by the mother for about 25–30 days, after which they fledge. The drakes and the ducks with young generally move to the winter quarters separately. After the first winter, the young moult into adult plumage. The maximum recorded lifespan (though it is not clear whether this refers to the common or the green-winged teal) was over 27 years, moderately high for such a small bird.
