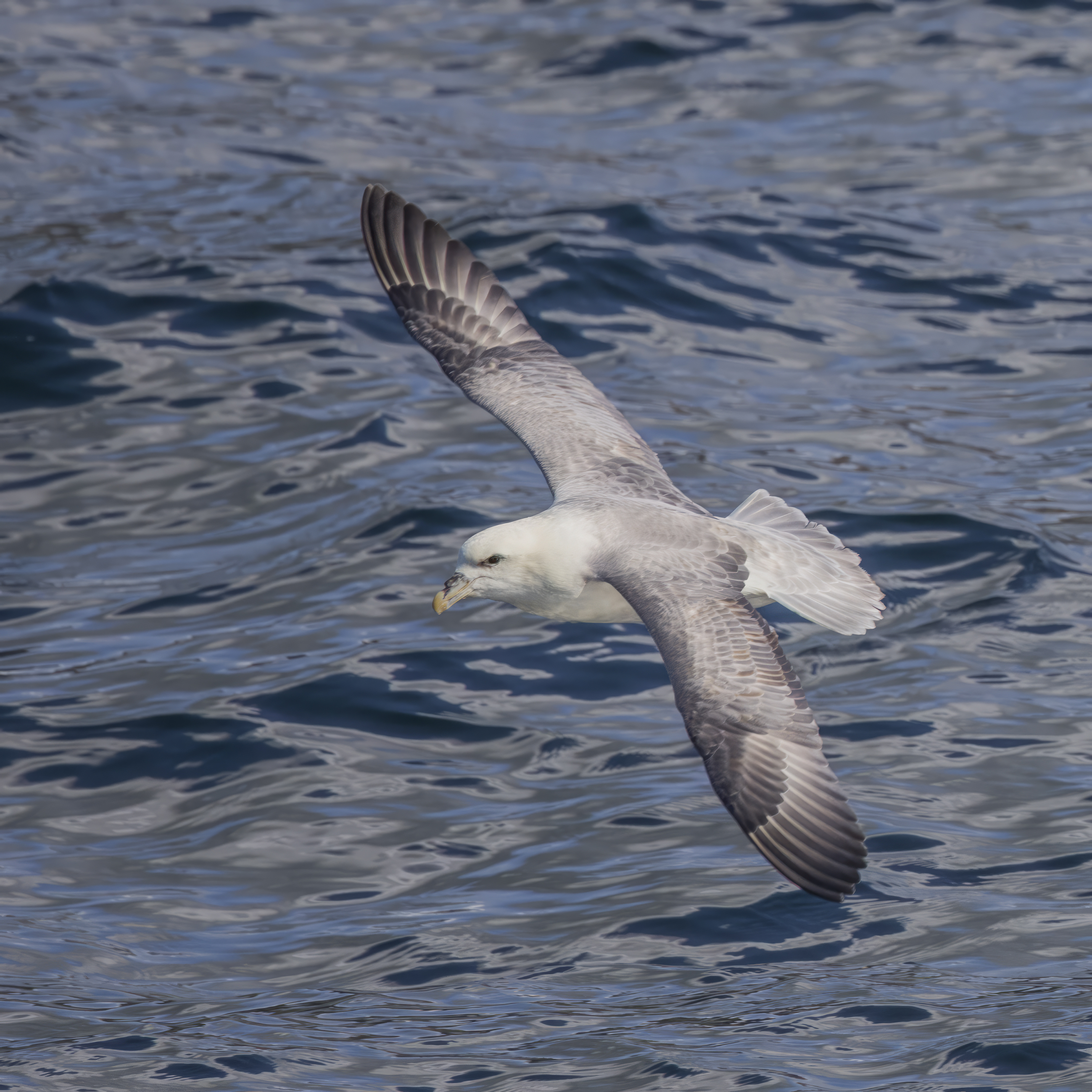
- Fulmarus glacialis auduboni near Moher, Ireland

Conservation status
- Least Concern (IUCN 3.1)

Scientific classification
- Kingdom: Animalia
- Phylum: Chordata
- Class: Aves
- Order: Procellariiformes
- Family: Procellariidae
- Genus: Fulmarus
- Species: F. glacialis

Binomial name
- Fulmarus glacialis (Linnaeus, 1761)

Subspecies
- Fulmarus glacialis glacialis (Linnaeus, 1761); Fulmarus glacialis auduboni Fulmarus glacialis rodgersii
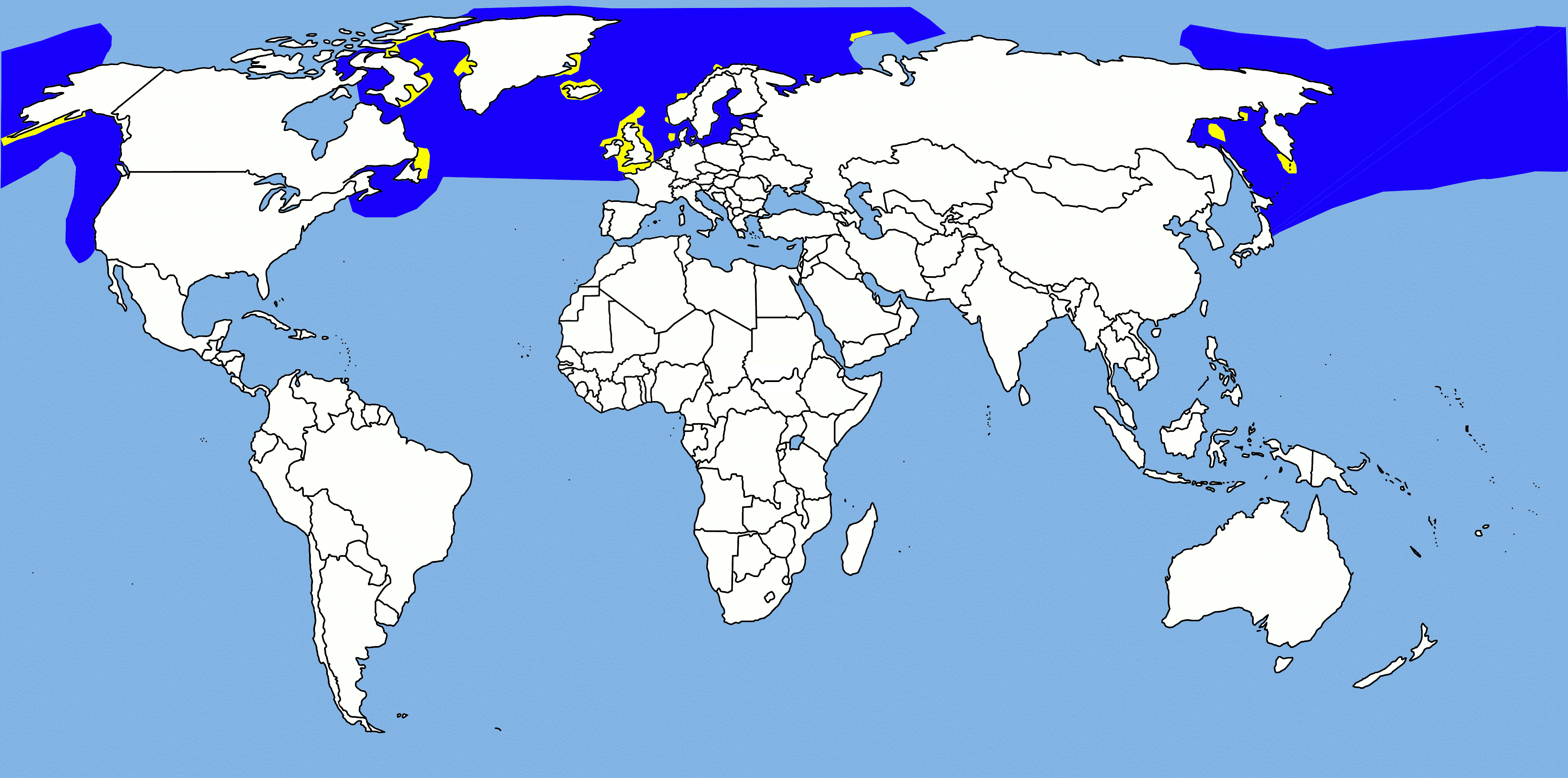
- Range of F. glacialis Breeding range Wintering range

Synonyms
- Procellaria glacialis Linnaeus, 1761

= Northern fulmar =

Species of bird

The northern fulmar, Arctic fulmar, or simply fulmar (Fulmarus glacialis) is an abundant seabird found primarily in subarctic regions of the North Atlantic and North Pacific oceans. There has been one confirmed sighting in the Southern Hemisphere, with a single bird seen south of New Zealand. Fulmars come in one of two colour morphs; a light one in temperate populations, with white head and body and grey wings and tail, and a dark one in arctic populations, which is uniformly grey; intermediate birds are common. Though similar in appearance to gulls, fulmars are in fact members of the family Procellariidae, which includes petrels and shearwaters.

The northern fulmar and its sister species, the southern fulmar (Fulmarus glacialoides), are the only extant members of the genus Fulmarus. The fulmars are in turn a member of the order Procellariiformes, and they all share certain identifying features. First, they have nasal passages that attach to the upper bill called naricorns; however, nostrils on albatrosses are on the sides of the bill, as opposed to the rest of the order, including fulmars, which have nostrils on top of the upper bill. The bills of Procellariiformes are also unique in that they are split into between seven and nine horny plates. One of these plates makes up the hooked portion of the upper bill, called the maxillary unguis. They produce a stomach oil made up of wax esters and triglycerides that is stored in the proventriculus. This can be sprayed out of their mouths as a defense against predators from a very early age, and as an energy rich food source for chicks and for the adults during their long flights. It will mat the plumage of avian predators, and can lead to their death. Finally, they also have a salt gland that is situated above the nasal passage that helps desalinate their bodies, due to the high amount of ocean water that they imbibe. This gland excretes a high saline solution from their nose.

The northern fulmar was first described as Procellaria glacialis by Carl Linnaeus in 1761, based on a specimen from within the Arctic Circle, on Spitsbergen. The Mallemuk Mountain in Northeastern Greenland is named after the northern fulmar (Danish: Mallemuk).

== Taxonomy ==
The northern fulmar was formally described by the Swedish naturalist Carl Linnaeus in 1761 in the second edition of his book Fauna Svecica. He placed it with the other petrels in the genus Procellaria and coined the binomial name Procellaria glacialis. Linnaeus based his description mainly on the "Mallemucke" that had been described and illustrated in 1675 by the German naturalist Friderich Martens in his account of his voyage to Spitzbergen. The northern fulmar is now placed in the genus Fulmarus that was introduced in 1826 by the English naturalist James Stephens. The genus name comes from the Old Norse Fúlmár meaning "foul-mew" or "foul-gull" because of the birds' habit of ejecting a foul-smelling oil. The specific epithet glacialis is Latin for "icy".

Three subspecies are recognised:

- F. g. glacialis (Linnaeus, 1761) – the nominate subspecies, which breeds in the high arctic regions of the North Atlantic; remains at high latitudes in winter, occasionally south to Great Britain. Mostly dark morph, with grey body.
- F. g. auduboni Bonaparte, 1857 – breeds in the low arctic, boreal and temperate regions of the North Atlantic, south to Newfoundland in the west and Brittany in the east; wintering south to Delaware in the west and Portugal in the east. Tail pale grey. Mostly light morph, with white body. Included in F. g. glacialis by some authors.
- F. g. rodgersii Cassin, 1862 – breeds in the North Pacific on the coast of eastern Siberia (south to the Kuril Islands), Alaska, and (in very small numbers) in British Columbia south to Triangle Island; wintering south to Japan in the west and Baja California in the east. Tail contrastingly dark grey.

== Description ==
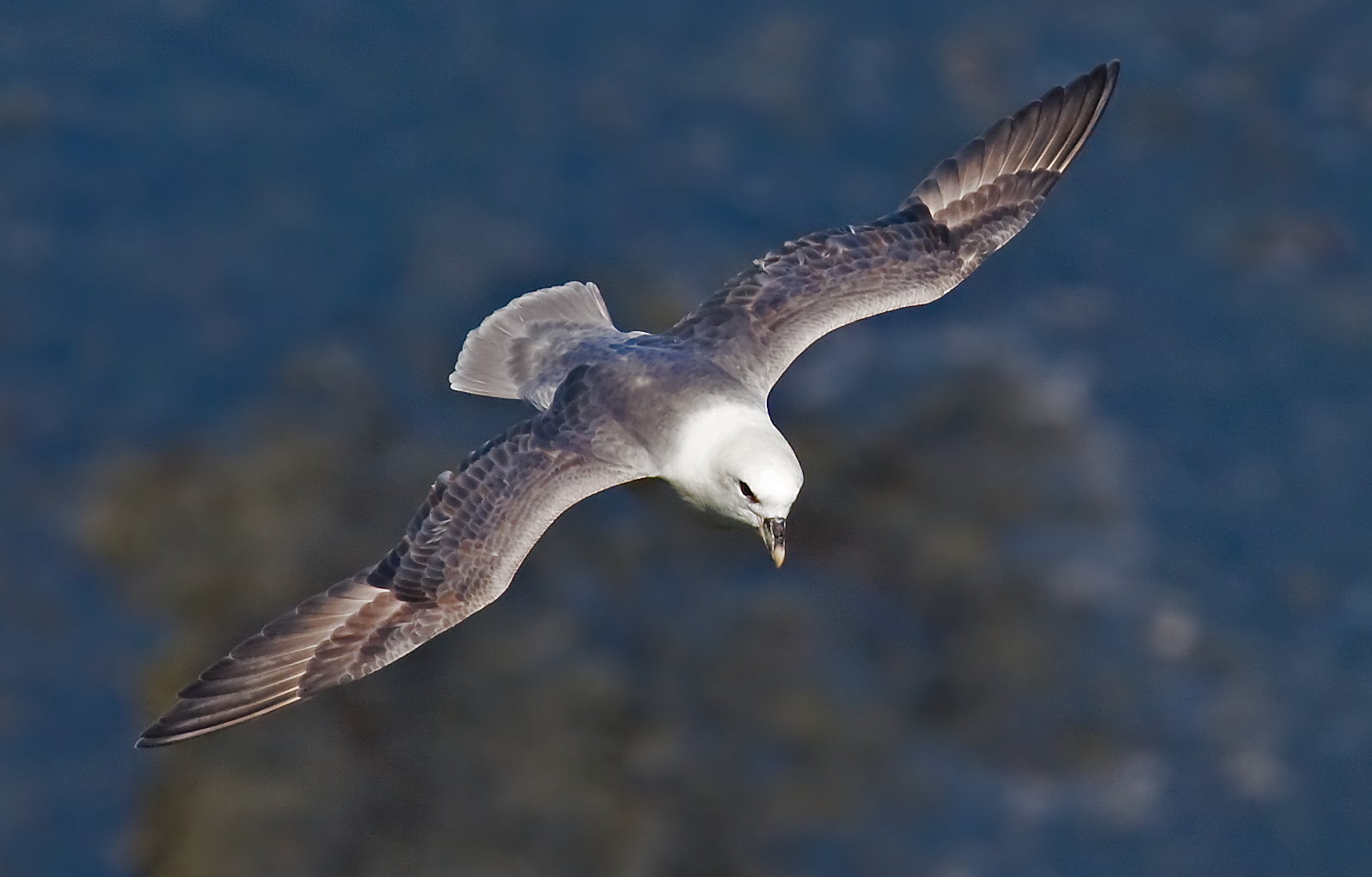
Fulmarus glacialis auduboni at Heligoland, Germany

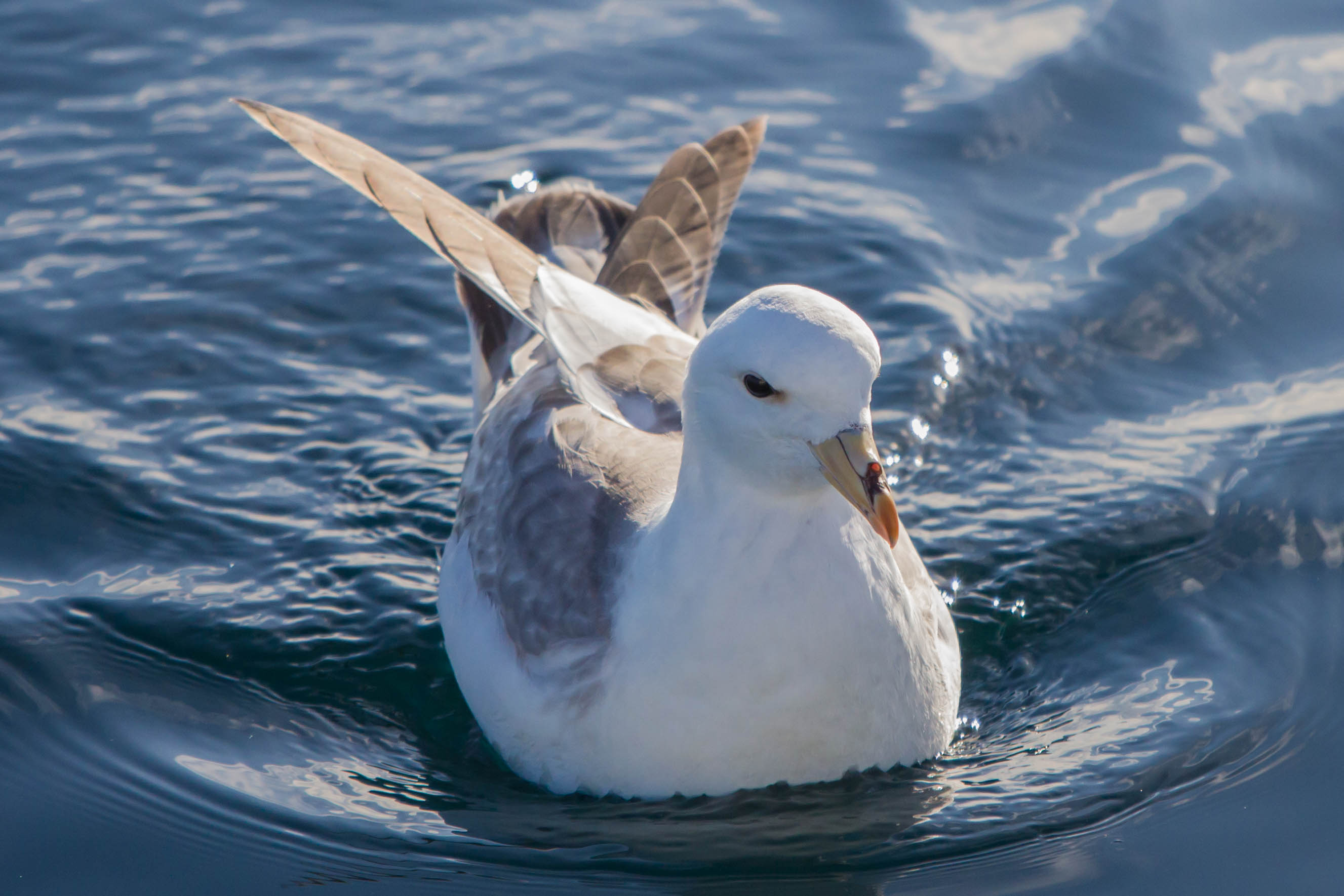
Fulmarus glacialis rodgersii off Morro Bay, California

The northern fulmar has a wingspan of 102 to 112 cm (40–44 in) and is 46 cm (18 in) in length. Body mass can range from 450 to 1,000 g (16 to 35 oz). This species is grey and white with a pale yellow, thick bill and bluish legs. However, there are both a light morph and dark, or "blue", morph; in the Pacific Ocean there is an intermediate morph as well. Only the dark morph has more than dark edges on the underneath but they all have pale inner primaries on the top of the wings. The Pacific morph has a darker tail than the Atlantic morph.

Like other petrels, their walking ability is limited, but they are strong fliers, with a stiff wing action quite unlike the gulls. They look bull-necked compared to gulls, and have short stubby bills. They are long-lived, with a lifespan of 31 years not uncommon, and exceptionally over 50 years, recorded on Eynhallow in Orkney.

Population and trends
Location	Breeding population	Winter population	Breeding trend
Faroe Islands	600,000 pairs	500,000–3,000,000 individuals	stable
Greenland	120,000–200,000 pairs	10,000–100,000 individuals	stable
France	1,300–1,350 pairs	100–500 individuals	increasing
Germany	102 pairs		increasing
Iceland	1,000,000–2,000,000 pairs	1,000,000—5,000,000 individuals	decreasing
Ireland	33,000 pairs		increasing
Denmark	2 pairs	200–300 individuals	increasing
Norway	7,000–8,000 pairs		increasing
Svalbard	500,000–1,000,000 pairs		increasing
Russia (Europe)	1,000–2,500 pairs		
United Kingdom	506,000 pairs		
Canada, Russia (Asia), & US	2,600,000–4,200,000 pairs		
Total (adult individuals)	15,000,000–30,000,000		increasing

== Behaviour ==
=== Feeding ===
Northern fulmars will feed on shrimps, fish, squid, plankton, jellyfish, and carrion, as well as refuse. When eating fish, they will dive up to 4 metres deep to retrieve their prey.

=== Breeding ===
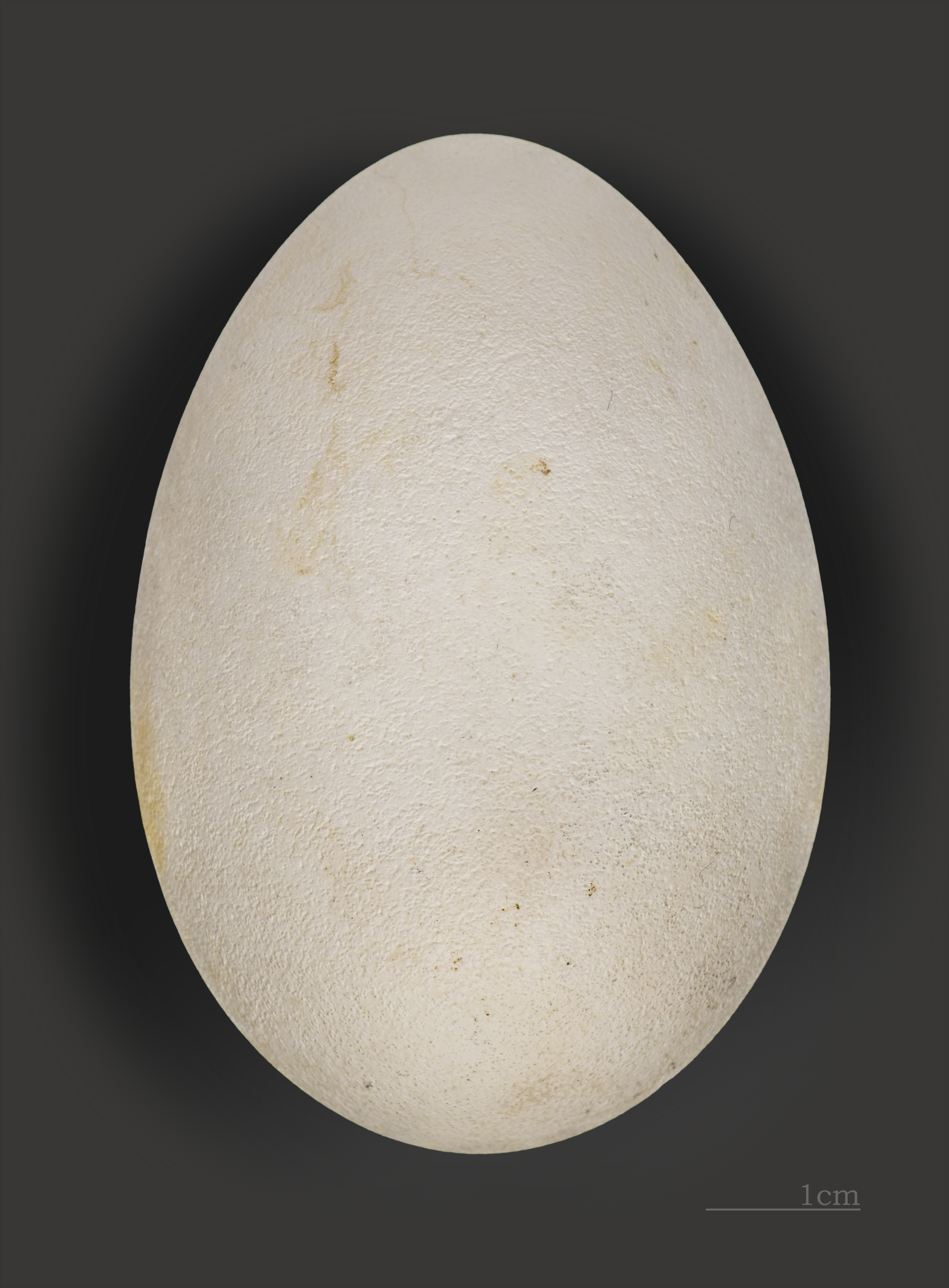
Fulmar egg

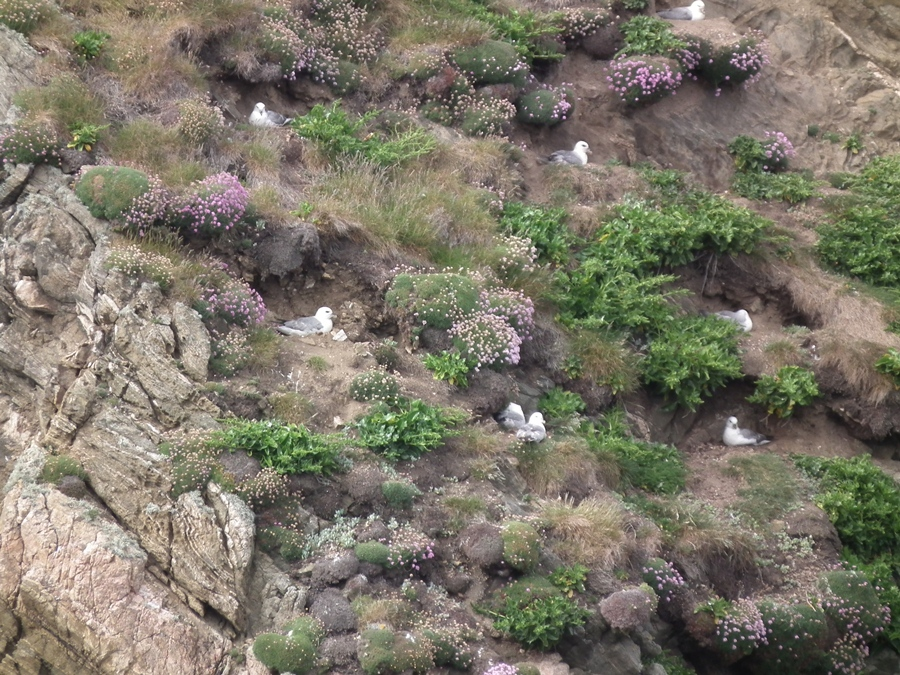
Nests in County Mayo, Ireland

The northern fulmar starts breeding at between six and twelve years old. It is monogamous, and forms long-term pair bonds. It returns to the same nest site year after year. The breeding season starts in May; however, the female has glands that store sperm to allow weeks to pass between copulation and the laying of the egg. During the breeding season adult Fulmars usually remain within 500 km of their breeding colony instead of traveling up to thousands of kilometres while searching for food. Their nest is a scrape on a grassy ledge or a saucer of vegetation on the ground, lined with softer material. The birds nest in large colonies. Recently, they have started nesting on rooftops and buildings. Both sexes are involved in the nest-building process. A single white egg, 74 mm × 51 mm (2.9 in × 2.0 in), is incubated for a period of 50 to 54 days, by both sexes. The altricial chick is brooded for 2 weeks and fully fledges after 70 to 75 days. Again, both sexes are involved. During this period, the parents are nocturnal, and will even be inactive on well-lit nights.

=== Social behaviour ===
The mating ritual of this fulmar consists of the female resting on a ledge and the male landing with his bill open and his head back. He commences to wave his head side to side and up and down while calling.

They make grunting and chuckling sounds while eating and guttural calls during the breeding season.

== Conservation ==
The northern fulmar is estimated to have between 15,000,000 and 30,000,000 mature individuals that occupy an occurrence range of 28,400,000 km^{2} (11,000,000 sq mi) and their North American population is on the rise, hence it is listed with the IUCN as Least Concern. The range of these species increased greatly last century due to the availability of fish offal from commercial fleets, but may contract because of less food from this source and climatic change. The population increase has been especially notable in the British Isles.

== Anthropogenic impact ==
Northern fulmars' stomach contents are a hallmark indicator of marine debris in marine environments because of their high abundance and wide distribution. A study of 143 northern fulmars from 2008 to 2013 found 89.5% of them containing microplastics within their gastrointestinal tracts. A mean score of 19.5 pieces of plastic and 0.461 g per individual was calculated. This is considerably higher than in past studies on northern fulmars, possibly implying increasing plastic debris in marine ecosystems and shorelines. However, more research is needed to substantiate such conclusion. Long-term data from the Netherlands dating back to the 1980s show an increase in consumer plastics and a decrease in industrial plastics in the stomach contents of fulmars. The increased plastic ingestion can occur through biomagnification: their diet consists of such invertebrates like plankton that have shown an increase of consumption of microplastics entering the ocean. By going deeper into the food web of marine life, it is evident that fulmars could be indirectly affected through tropic transfer and biomagnification, and similarly could also affect their predators ingestion of plastic pollution. With the increase in freshwater pollution of plastic debris, there may be a further rise in microplastic content of seabird gastrointestinal tracts.

== Legend ==
A popular story among the central Inuit, for instance, is that of their race-mother Sedna, who was the daughter of a chief, and was wooed by a fulmar who promised her, if she would marry him, a delightful life in his distant home. So she went away with him. But she had been ruefully deceived, and was cruelly mistreated. A year later her father went to pay her a visit; and discovering her misery he killed her husband and took his repentant daughter home. The other fulmars in the village followed them, mourning and crying for their murdered fellow, and fulmars continue to utter doleful cries to this day.

== Sources ==
- BirdLife International (2004). "Fulmarus glacialis Northern Fulmar" (PDF). Archived from the original (PDF) on 3 January 2009.
- BirdLife International (2009a). "Northern Fulmar". BirdLife Species Factsheet.
- BirdLife International (2009b). The BirdLife checklist of the birds of the world, with conservation status and taxonomic sources.
- Bull, John; Farrand, John Jr. (June 1993) [1977]. "Open Ocean". In Opper, Jane (ed.). The Audubon Society Field Guide to North American Birds. The Audubon Society Field Guide Series. Vol. Birds (Eastern Region) (1st ed.). New York, NY: Alfred A. Knopf. p. 314. ISBN 0-394-41405-5.
- del Hoyo, Joseph, ed. (1992). Handbook of the Birds of the World. Vol. 1. ISBN 84-87334-10-5.
- Double, M.C. (2003). "Procellariiformes (Tubenosed Seabirds)". In Hutchins, Michael; Jackson, Jerome A.; Bock, Walter J.; Olendorf, Donna (eds.). Grzimek's Animal Life Encyclopedia. Vol. 8 Birds I Tinamous and Ratites to Hoatzins (2nd ed.). Farmington Hills, MI: Gale Group. pp. 107–111. ISBN 0-7876-5784-0.
- Dunn, Jon L.; Alderfer, Jonathan (2006). "Shearwaters, Petrels (Family Procellariidae)". In Levitt, Barbara (ed.). National Geographic Field Guide to the Birds of North America (fifth ed.). Washington D.C.: National Geographic Society. p. 82. ISBN 978-1-4262-0828-7.
- Ehrlich, Paul R.; Dobkin, David, S.; Wheye, Darryl (1988). The Birders Handbook (First ed.). New York, NY: Simon & Schuster. pp. 14, 29–31. ISBN 0-671-65989-8.
- Floyd, Ted (2008). "Tubenoses: Albatrosses, Shearwaters & Petrels, and Storm-petrels". In Hess, Paul; Scott, George (eds.). Smithsonian Field Guide to the Birds of North America (First ed.). New York, NY: HarperCollins Publishers. p. 82. ISBN 978-0-06-112040-4.
- Harrison, C.; Greensmith, A. (1993). "Non-passerines". In Bunting, E. (ed.). Birds of the World. New York, NY: Dorling Kindersley. pp. 50. ISBN 1-56458-295-7.
- Maynard, B.J. (2003). "Shearwaters, petrels, and fulmars (Procellariidae)". In Hutchins, Michael; Jackson, Jerome A.; Bock, Walter J.; Olendorf, Donna (eds.). Grzimek's Animal Life Encyclopedia. Vol. 8 Birds I Tinamous and Ratites to Hoatzins (2nd ed.). Farmington Hills, MI: Gale Group. pp. 123–133. ISBN 0-7876-5784-0.
- Peterson, Roger T. (1961) [1941]. "Shearwaters, Fulmars, Large Petrels: Procellariidae". A Field Guide to Western Birds. Peterson Field Guide. Vol. 2 (Second ed.). Boston, MA: Houghton Mifflin. ISBN 0-395-13692-X.
- Sibley, David A. (2000). "Albatrosses, Petrels and Shearwaters Families: Diomedeidae, Procellariidae". The Sibley Guide to Birds (First ed.). New York, NY: Alfred A. Knopf. p. 32. ISBN 0-679-45122-6.
- Strøm, Hallvard (2011). "Northern Fulmar". Norwegian Polar Institute.
- Udvarty, Miklos D.F.; Farrand, John Jr. (1994) [1977]. Locke, Edie (ed.). National Audubon Society Field Guide to North American Birds. National Audubon Field Guide Series. Vol. Birds (Western Region) (First ed.). New York, NY: Alfred A. Knopf. pp. 358–359. ISBN 0-679-42851-8.
