= Fulmarus hammeri =

Fulmarus hammeri Temporal range: Late Miocene

Scientific classification
- Kingdom: Animalia
- Phylum: Chordata
- Class: Aves
- Order: Procellariiformes
- Family: Procellariidae
- Genus: Fulmarus
- Species: †F. hammeri

Binomial name
- †Fulmarus hammeri Howard, 1968

Extinct species of bird

Fulmarus hammeri is an extinct species of Fulmarus that lived during the Late Miocene.

== Distribution ==
Fulmarushammeri fossils are known from Laguna Hills in Orange County, California.
