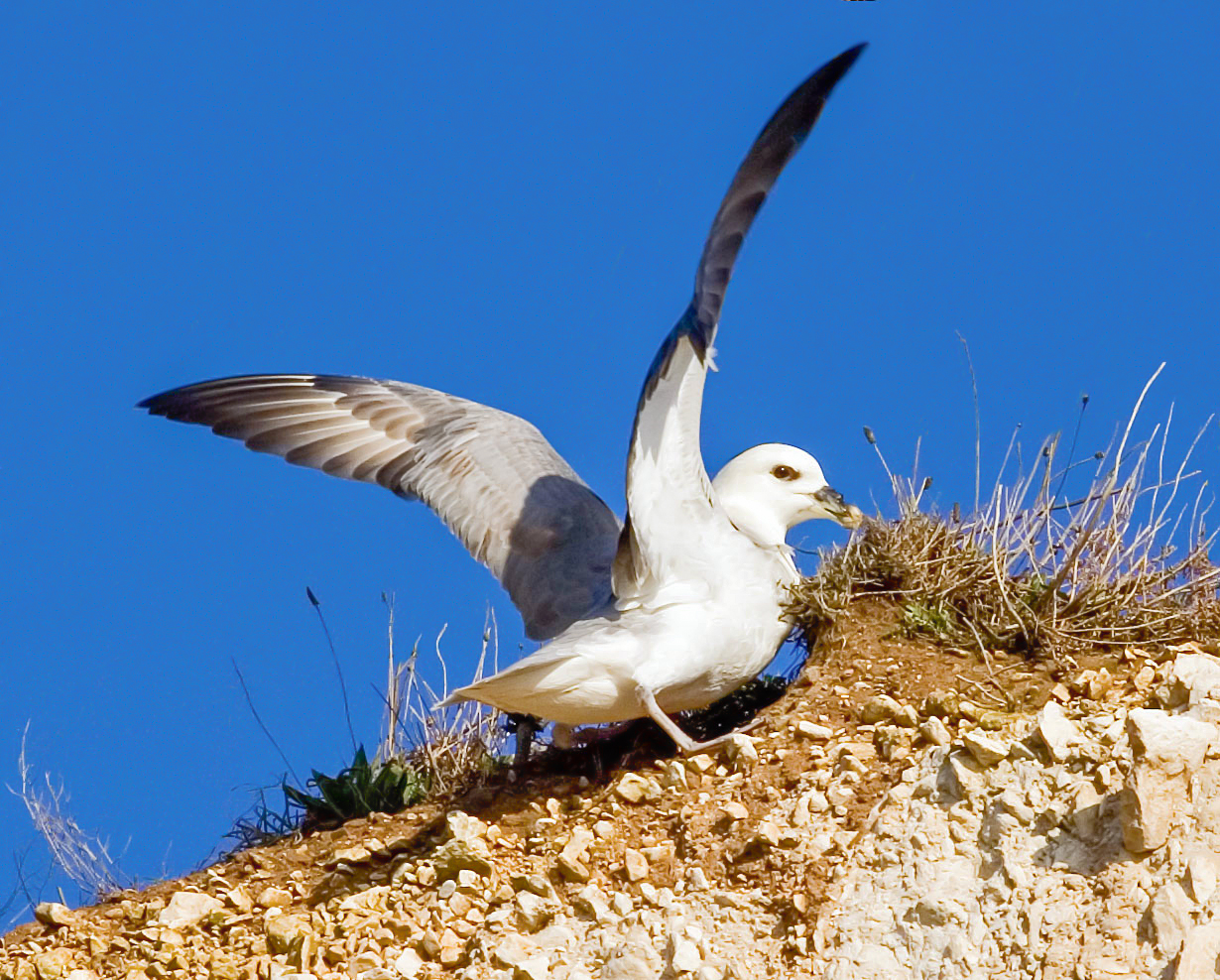
- Northern fulmar

Scientific classification
- Kingdom: Animalia
- Phylum: Chordata
- Class: Aves
- Order: Procellariiformes
- Family: Procellariidae
- Genus: Fulmarus; Stephens, 1826

Type species
- Procellaria glacialis (northern fulmar) Linnaeus, 1761

Species
- Fulmarus glacialis – northern fulmar; Fulmarus glacialoides – southern fulmar; †Fulmarus miocaenus; †Fulmarus hammeri

Audio
- Northern fulmar

= Fulmar =

Fulmar Temporal range: Miocene - Present ~14–0 Ma

Genus of birds

The fulmars are tube-nosed seabirds in the family Procellariidae. The family includes two extant species, and two extinct fossil species from the Miocene.

Fulmars superficially resemble gulls, but are readily distinguished by their flight on stiff wings, and their tube noses. They breed on cliffs, laying one or rarely two eggs on a ledge of bare rock or on a grassy cliff. Outside the breeding season, they are pelagic, feeding on fish, squid and shrimp in the open ocean. They are long-lived for birds, able to live to over 45 years old.

Historically, temperate Atlantic populations of the northern fulmar lived on the islands of St. Kilda, where it was extensively hunted, and Grimsey (Iceland). The species has expanded its breeding range eastwards and southwards to the coasts of the Faroes, Britain and Ireland, northern France, Norway and Heligoland, as well as around the coast of Iceland and to southern Greenland. Arctic populations are found in Baffin Island, Jan Mayen and Svalbard.

== Taxonomy ==
The genus Fulmarus was introduced in 1826 by the English naturalist James Stephens. The name comes from the Old Norse Fúlmár meaning "foul-mew" or "foul-gull" because of the birds' habit of ejecting a foul-smelling oil. The type species was designated by George Gray in 1855 as the northern fulmar.

As members of Procellaridae and then the order Procellariiformes, they share certain traits. First, they have nasal passages that attach to the upper bill called naricorns. The bills of Procellariiformes are unique in being split into between seven and nine horny plates. Finally, they produce a stomach oil made up of wax esters and triglycerides that is stored in the proventriculus. This can be sprayed out of their mouths as a defence against predators and as an energy rich food source for chicks and for the adults during their long flights. It will mat the plumage of avian predators, which can lead to their death. Fulmars have a salt gland that is situated above the nasal passage and helps desalinate their bodies, due to the high amount of ocean water that they imbibe. It excretes a strong saline solution from their nose.

=== Extant species ===
The genus contains the following two species.

Genus Fulmarus – Stephens, 1826 – two species
| Common name | Scientific name and subspecies | Range | Size and ecology | IUCN status and estimated population |
|---|---|---|---|---|
| Northern fulmar F. g. glacialis, Svalbard | Fulmarus glacialis (Linnaeus, 1761) Three subspecies: F. g. glacialis (Linnaeus, 1761); F. g. auduboni Bonaparte, 1857; F. g. rodgersii Cassin, 1862 | Arctic, North Atlantic, and North Pacific oceans. | Size: Habitat: Diet: | LC |
| Southern fulmar | Fulmarus glacialoides (Smith, 1840) Monotypic | Seas and islands around Antarctica, including the South Sandwich Islands, South Orkney Islands, South Shetland Islands, Bouvet Island, and Peter I Island | Size: Habitat: Diet: | LC |

=== Fossils ===
Two prehistoric species have been described from fossil bones found on the Pacific coast of California: Fulmarus miocaenus (Temblor Formation) and Fulmarus hammeri from the Miocene.

== Description ==
The two fulmars are closely related seabirds occupying the same niche in different oceans. The northern fulmar (Fulmarus glacialis) or just fulmar lives in the North Atlantic and North Pacific, whereas the southern fulmar (Fulmarus glacialoides) is, as its name implies, a bird of the Southern Oceans. These birds look superficially like gulls, but are not closely related, but are petrels. The northern species is grey or grey-and-white with a greyish bill, 43 to 52 cm (17–20 in) in length with a 102 to 112 cm (40–44 in) wingspan. The southern species is a paler bird with dark wing tips and a pink bill, 45 to 50 cm (18–20 in) long, with a 115 to 120 cm (45–47 in) wingspan.

== Behaviour ==
=== Breeding ===
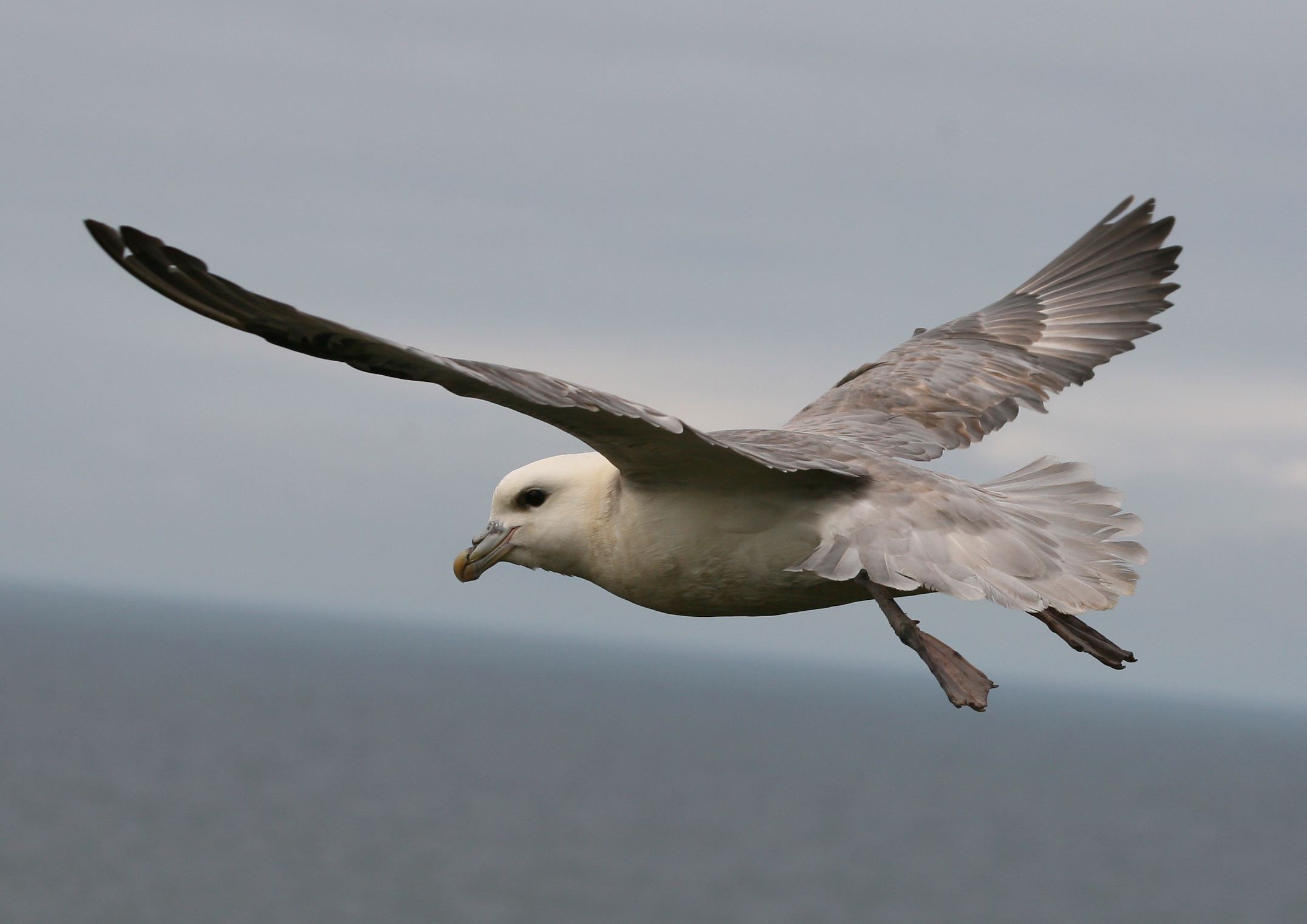
A northern fulmar in flight

Both recent species breed on cliffs, laying a single white egg. Unlike many small to medium birds in the Procellariiformes, they are neither nocturnal breeders, nor do they use burrows; their eggs are laid on the bare rock or in shallow depressions lined with plant material.

In Britain, northern fulmars historically bred on St. Kilda (where their harvesting for oil, feathers and meat was central to the islands' economy). They spread into northern Scotland in the 19th century, and to the rest of the United Kingdom by 1930. The expansion has continued further south; the fulmar can now often be seen in the English Channel and in France along the northern and western coasts, with breeding pairs or small colonies in Nord, Picardy, Normandy and along the Atlantic coast in Brittany.

=== Feeding ===
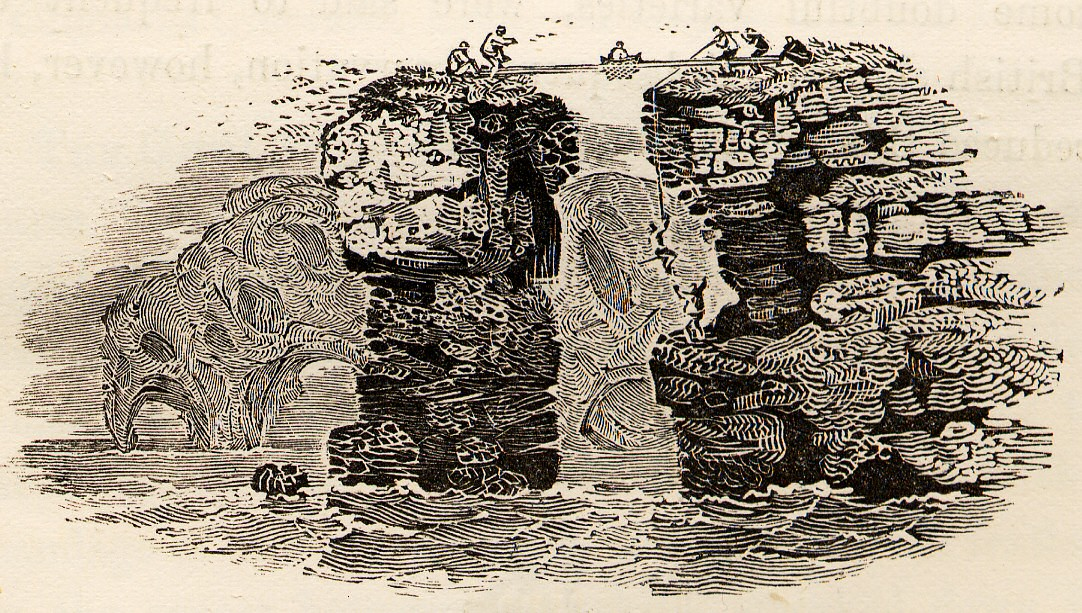
A tail-piece wood engraving in Thomas Bewick's A History of British Birds, Volume 2: Water Birds, 1804

Fulmars are highly pelagic outside the breeding season, like most tubenoses, feeding on fish, small squid, shrimp, crustaceans, marine worms, and marine carrion. The range of these species increased greatly in the 20th century due to the availability of fish offal from commercial fleets, but may contract because of less food from this source and climatic change. The population increase has been especially notable in the British Isles.

Like other petrels, their walking ability on land is limited, but they are strong fliers, with a stiff wing action quite unlike that of gulls. They look bull-necked compared to gulls, and have short stubby bills. They are long-lived, the longest recorded lifespan for F. glacialis being 45 years, 9 months and 12 days.

== Relationship with humans ==
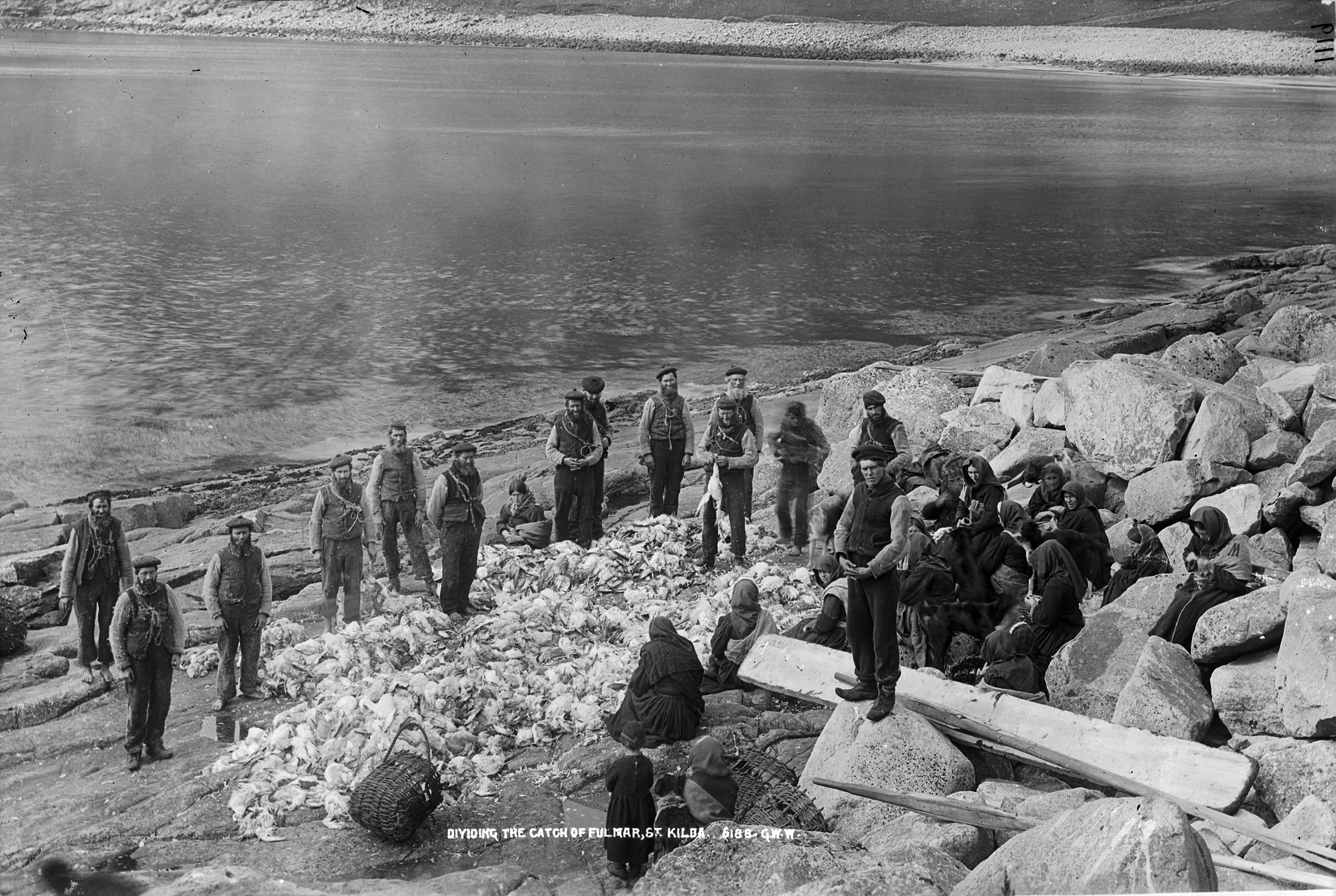
The catch of fulmars on St Kilda; George Washington Wilson, August 1884

Fulmars were hunted for food for centuries before being given protected status in the 20th century. The engraver Thomas Bewick wrote in 1804 that "Pennant, speaking of those [birds] which breed on, or inhabit, the Isle of St Kilda, says—'No bird is of so much use to the islanders as this: the Fulmar supplies them with oil for their lamps, down for their beds, a delicacy for their tables, a balm for their wounds, and a medicine for their distempers.'" A photograph by George Washington Wilson taken about 1886 shows a "view of the men and women of St Kilda on the beach dividing up the catch of Fulmar". James Fisher, author of The Fulmar (1952) calculated that every person on St Kilda consumed over 100 fulmars each year; the meat was their staple food, and they caught around 12,000 birds annually. Fulmar eggs were collected until the late 1920s in the St Kilda islands by their men scaling the cliffs. The eggs were buried in St Kilda peat ash to be eaten through the cold, northern winters. The eggs were considered to be similar to duck eggs in taste and nourishment. However, when the human population left St Kilda in 1930, the fulmar population did not suddenly increase.

Both the northern fulmar and the southern fulmar are listed as of Least Concern by the International Union for Conservation of Nature (IUCN).

== Gallery ==
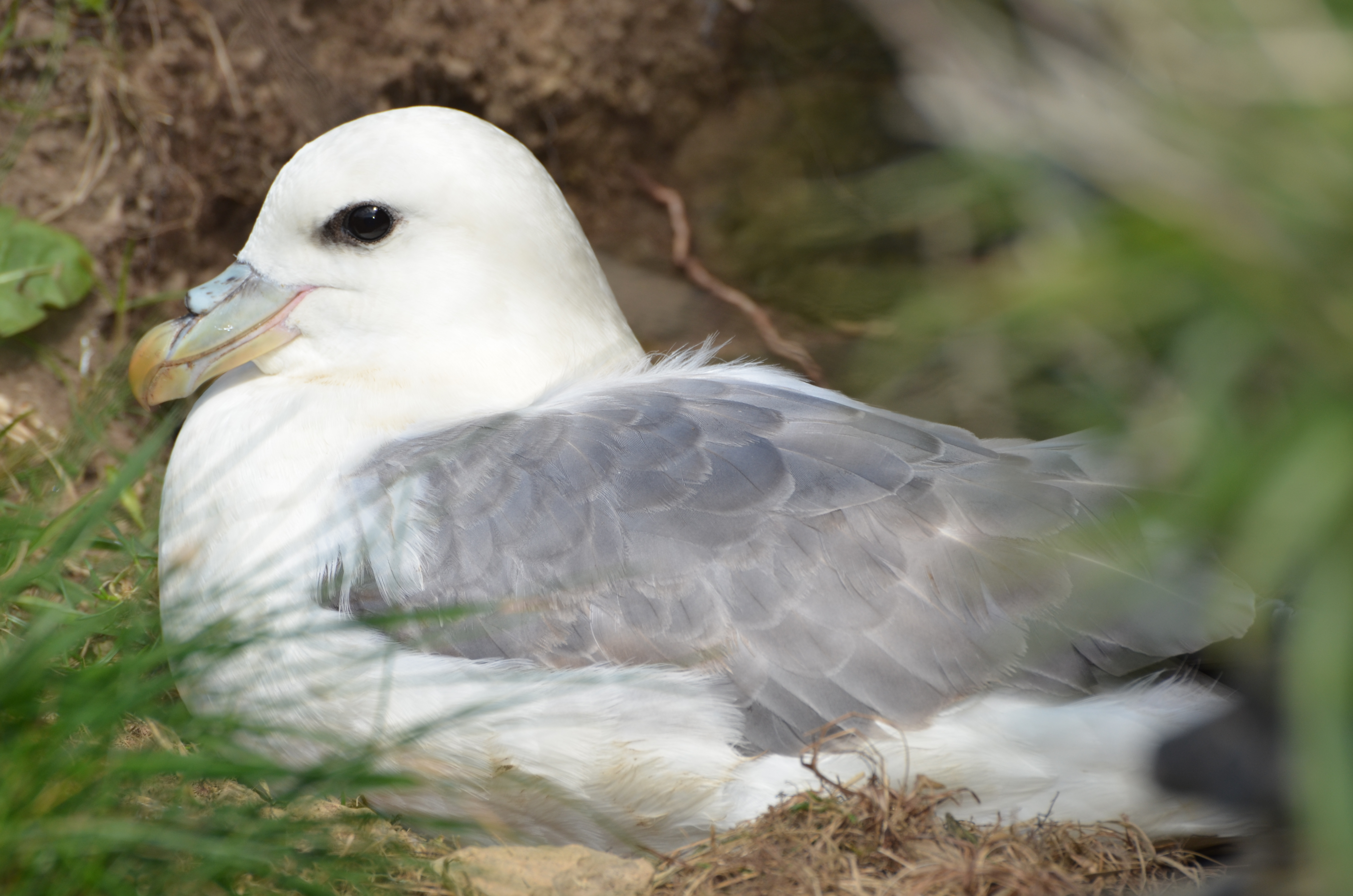
Northern fulmar F. g. auduboni on the nest in Orkney, Scotland

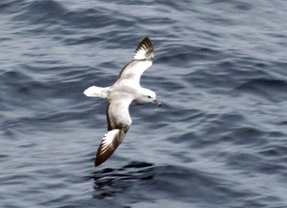
Southern fulmar in Drake's Passage

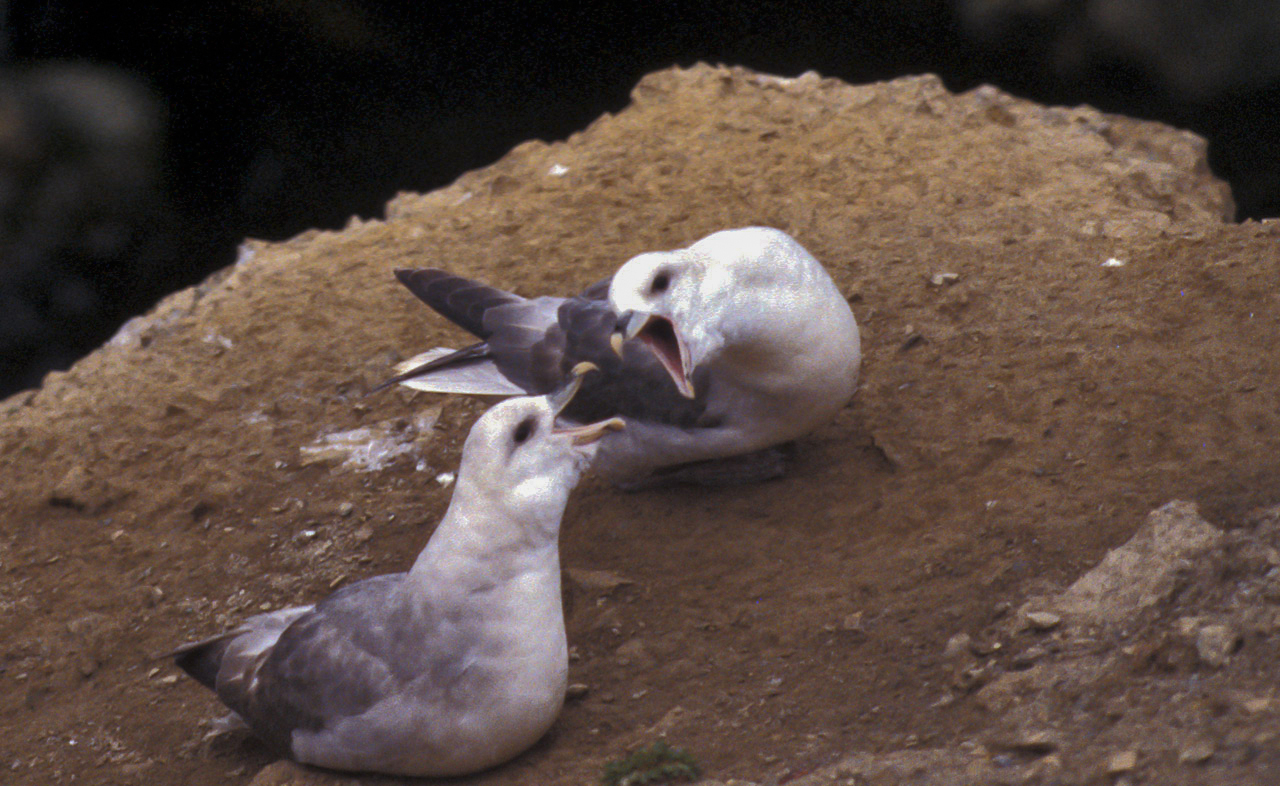
Northern fulmar, breeding on Bear Island (Norway)

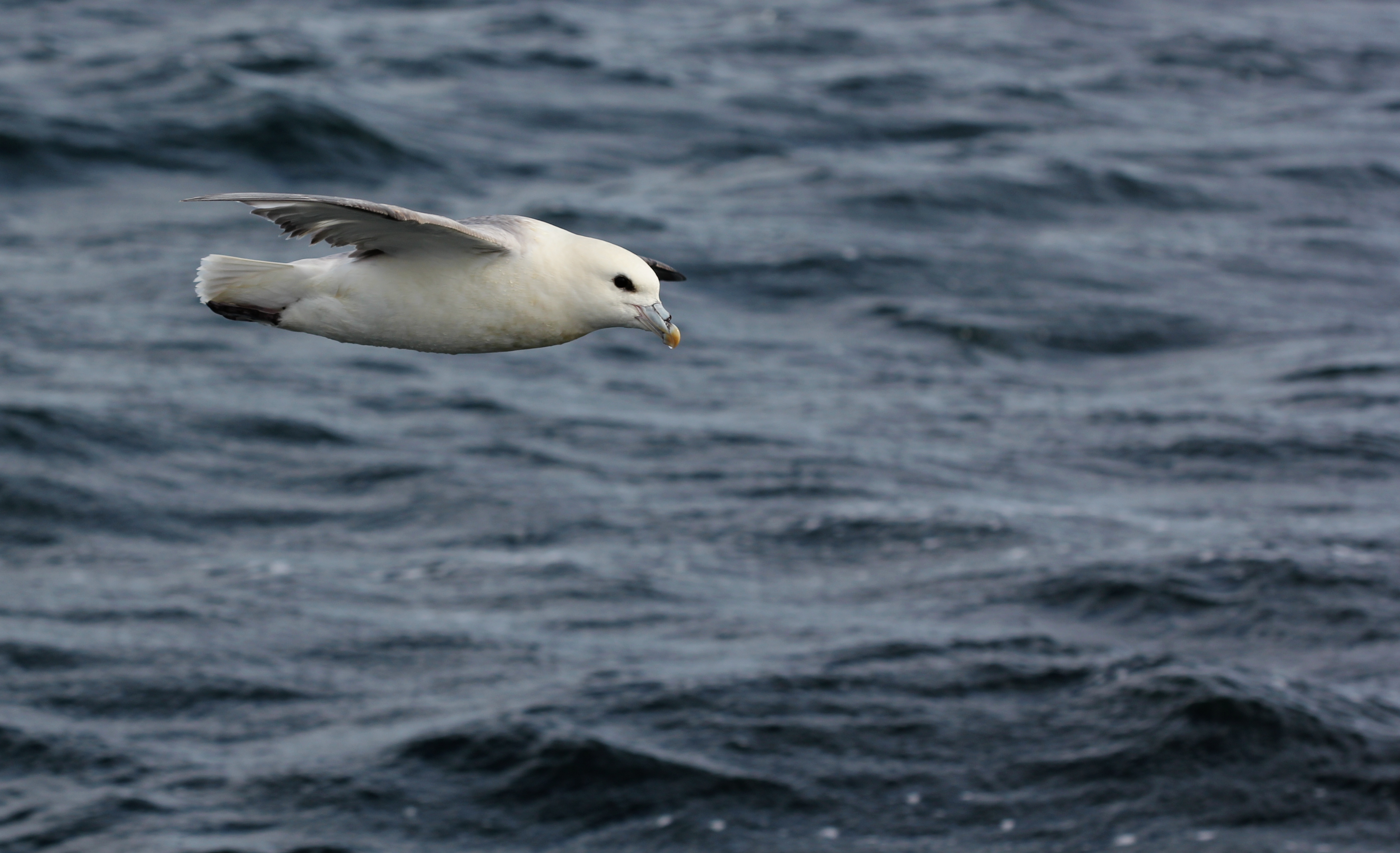
Northern fulmar in flight over Faxaflói (Iceland)

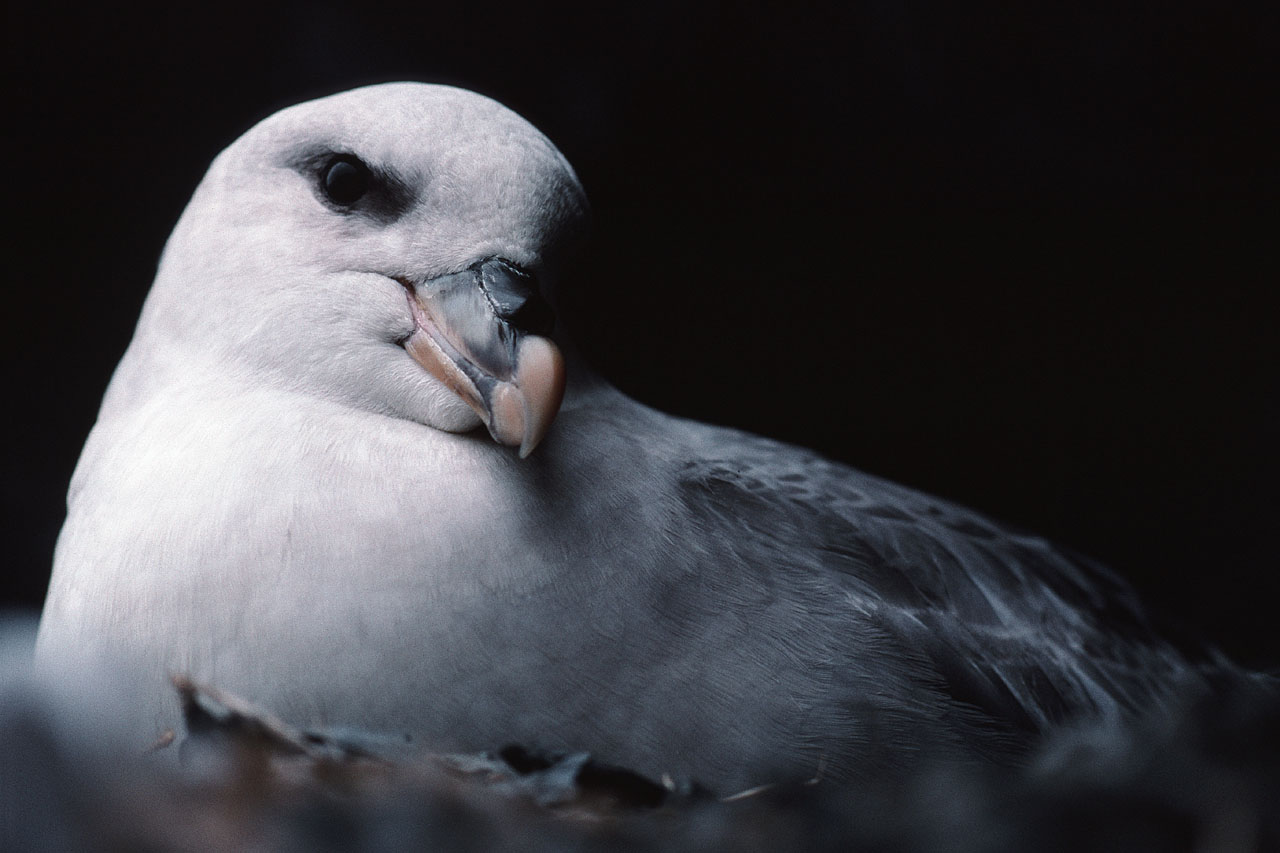
Northern fulmar, breeding on Bear Island

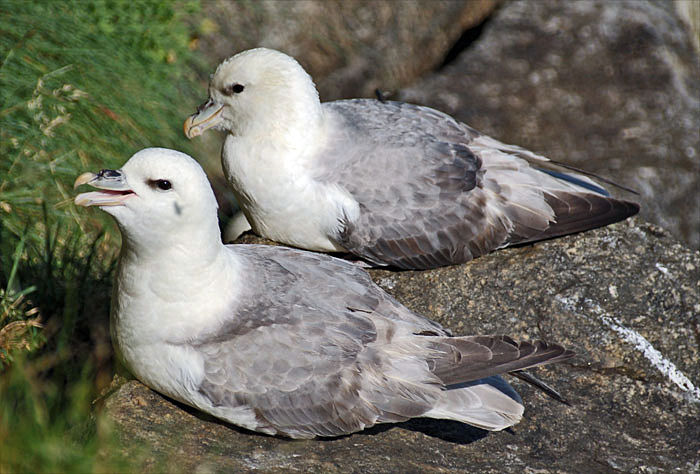
Northern fulmar, at the Norwegian bird island Runde

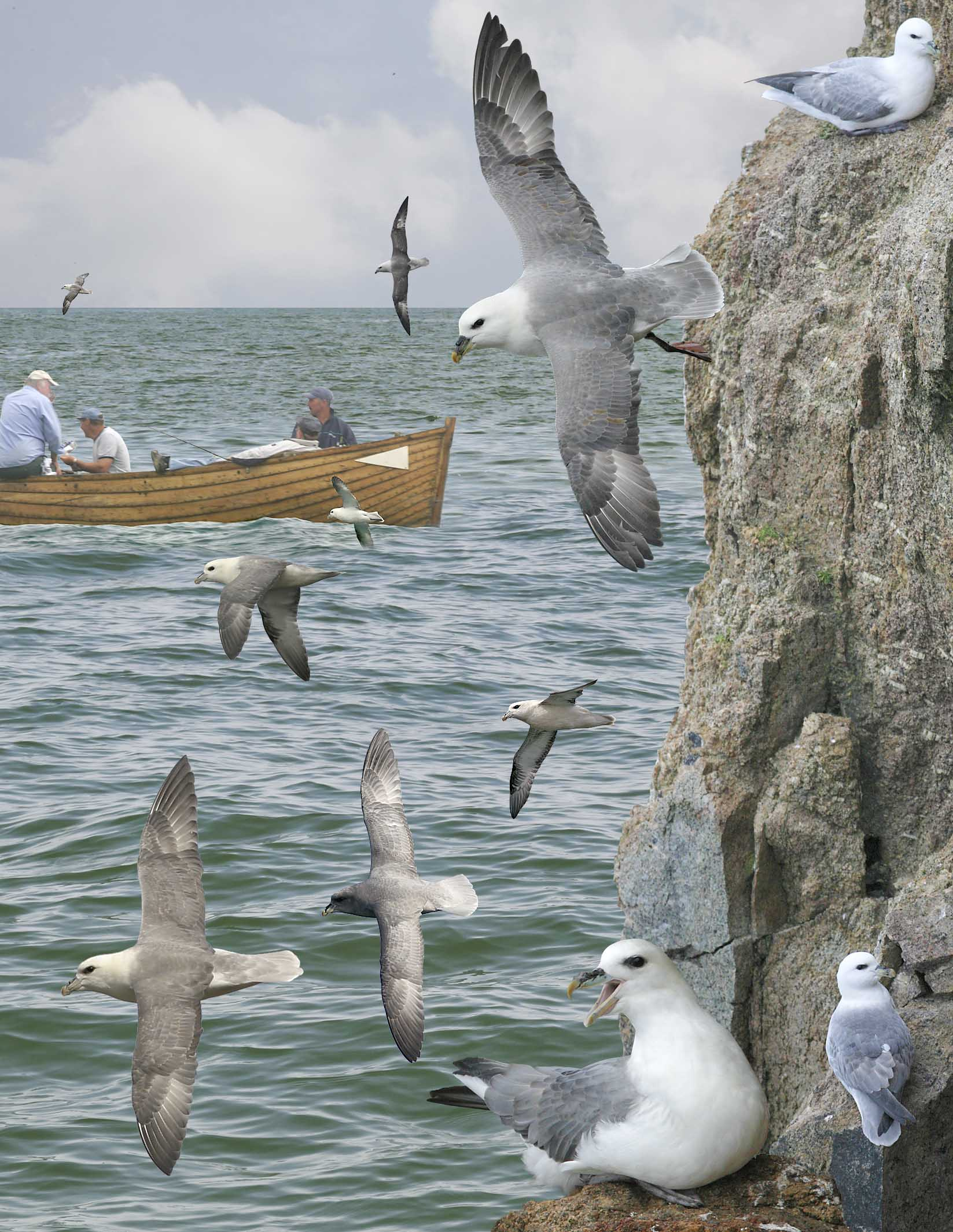
Composite image of northern fulmars in different plumages

== Sources ==
- Bull, John; Farrand Jr., John (June 1993) [1977]. "Open Ocean". In Opper, Jane (ed.). The Audubon Society Field Guide to North American Birds. The Audubon Society Field Guide Series. Vol. Birds (Eastern Region) (First ed.). New York, NY: Alfred A. Knopf. p. 314. ISBN 0-394-41405-5.
- Double, M. C. (2003). "Procellariiformes (Tubenosed Seabirds)". In Hutchins, Michael; Jackson, Jerome A.; Bock, Walter J.; Olendorf, Donna (eds.). Grzimek's Animal Life Encyclopedia. Vol. 8 Birds I Tinamous and Ratites to Hoatzins. Joseph E. Trumpey, Chief Scientific Illustrator (2nd ed.). Farmington Hills, MI: Gale Group. pp. 107–111. ISBN 0-7876-5784-0.
- Ehrlich, Paul R.; Dobkin, David S.; Wheye, Darryl (1988). The Birders Handbook (First ed.). New York, NY: Simon & Schuster. p. 14. ISBN 0-671-65989-8.
- Harrison, P. (1983). Seabirds: an identification guide. Beckenham, U.K.: Croom Helm. ISBN 0-7470-1410-8.
- Yeatman, L. (1976). Atlas des oiseaux nicheurs de France. Paris: Société Ornithologique de France. p. 8. See also more recent publication(s) with similar title.
