= Fauna Svecica =

1746 volume of animals in Sweden by Carl Linnaeus

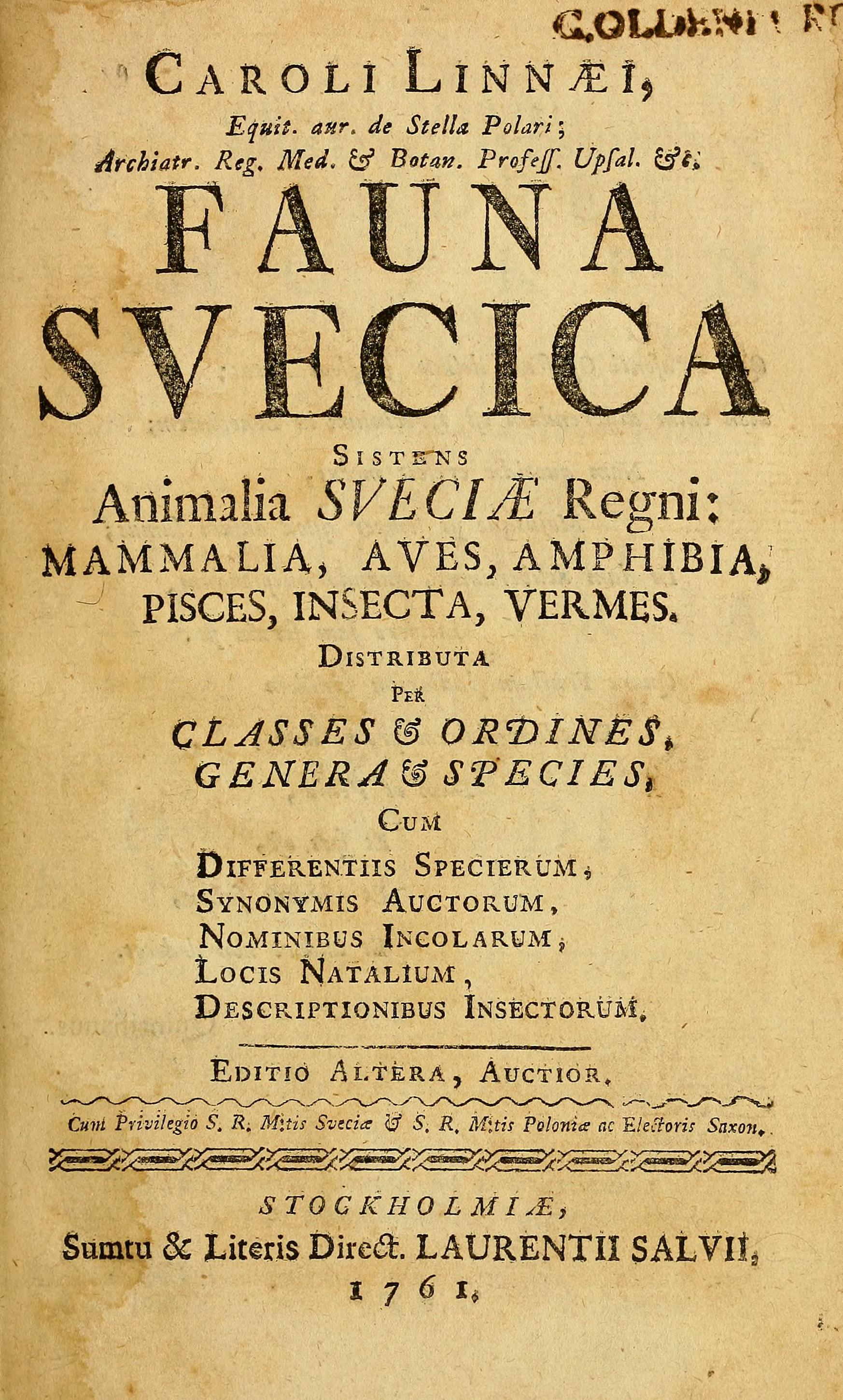
Fauna svecica BHL32170472

Fauna Svecica ("Fauna of Sweden", ed. 1, Stockholm, 1746; ed. 2 Stockholm, 1761) was written by Swedish botanist, physician, zoologist and naturalist Carl Linnaeus (1707–1778). This was the first full account of the animals in Sweden.

== Full title ==
The full title of the publication was Fauna Svecica: sistens animalia Sveciæ regni: qvadrupedia, aves, amphibia, pisces, insecta, vermes, distributa per classes & ordines, genera & species. Cum differentiis specierum, synonymis autorum, nominibus incolarum, locis habitationum, descriptionibus insectorum.

== English translation ==
Fauna Svecica, ed. 2, 1761, is currently under translation to English.
