= List of birds of New Zealand =

This is the list of the birds of New Zealand.

The North Island and South Island are the two largest islands of New Zealand. Stewart Island is the largest of the smaller islands. New Zealand proper also includes outlying islands such as the Chatham Islands, Kermadec Islands, and New Zealand Subantarctic Islands. Only New Zealand proper is represented on this list, not the Realm of New Zealand. For birds in the associated states or dependent territories, see List of birds of the Cook Islands, List of birds of Niue, List of birds of Tokelau, and List of birds of Antarctica.

Unless noted otherwise, all species listed below occur regularly in New Zealand as permanent residents, summer or winter visitors, or migrants. The species marked extinct became extinct subsequent to human arrival in New Zealand. About two thirds of the extinctions occurred after the arrival of Māori but before the arrival of Pākehā (European New Zealanders) and the rest since Pākehā arrived.

The following codes are used to denote other categories of species:

- (B) Breeding – confirmed nesting records in New Zealand or a portion thereof, excluding introduced species.
- (I) Introduced – a species introduced to New Zealand by the actions of humans, either directly or indirectly
- (X) Extinct – a species that became extinct after human arrival in New Zealand
- (ex) Extirpated – a species no longer found in New Zealand or a portion thereof but existing elsewhere
- (P) Regularly occurring in New Zealand or a portion thereof. The species occurs on an annual or mostly annual basis but does not nest in New Zealand.
- (V) Vagrant – a species rarely occurring in New Zealand or a portion thereof.

The list's taxonomic treatment and nomenclature (common and scientific names) mainly follows the conventions of The Clements Checklist of Birds of the World, 2022 edition. Some supplemental referencing is that of the Avibase Bird Checklists of the World as of 2022, and the 4th edition of the Checklist of the Birds of New Zealand, published in 2010 by Te Papa Press in association with the Ornithological Society of New Zealand, which is an authoritative list of the birds of New Zealand.

The species' common name in New Zealand English is given first, and its Māori-language name, if different, is also noted.

== Kiwi ==
Order: Apterygiformes Family: Apterygidae

Kiwi are flightless birds all native to New Zealand. Approximately the size of a domestic chicken, kiwi are by far the smallest ratites.

Species	Kermadecs	North I	South I	Stewart	Chathams	Snares	Auckland	Campbell	Antipodes	Bounty
Southern brown kiwi (Māori: tokoeka) Apteryx australis			B	B						
Okarito kiwi (Māori: rowi) Apteryx rowi			B							
North Island brown kiwi Apteryx mantelli		B								
Little spotted kiwi (Māori: kiwi pukupuku) Apteryx owenii		B	B							
Great spotted kiwi (Māori: roroa) Apteryx maxima			B							

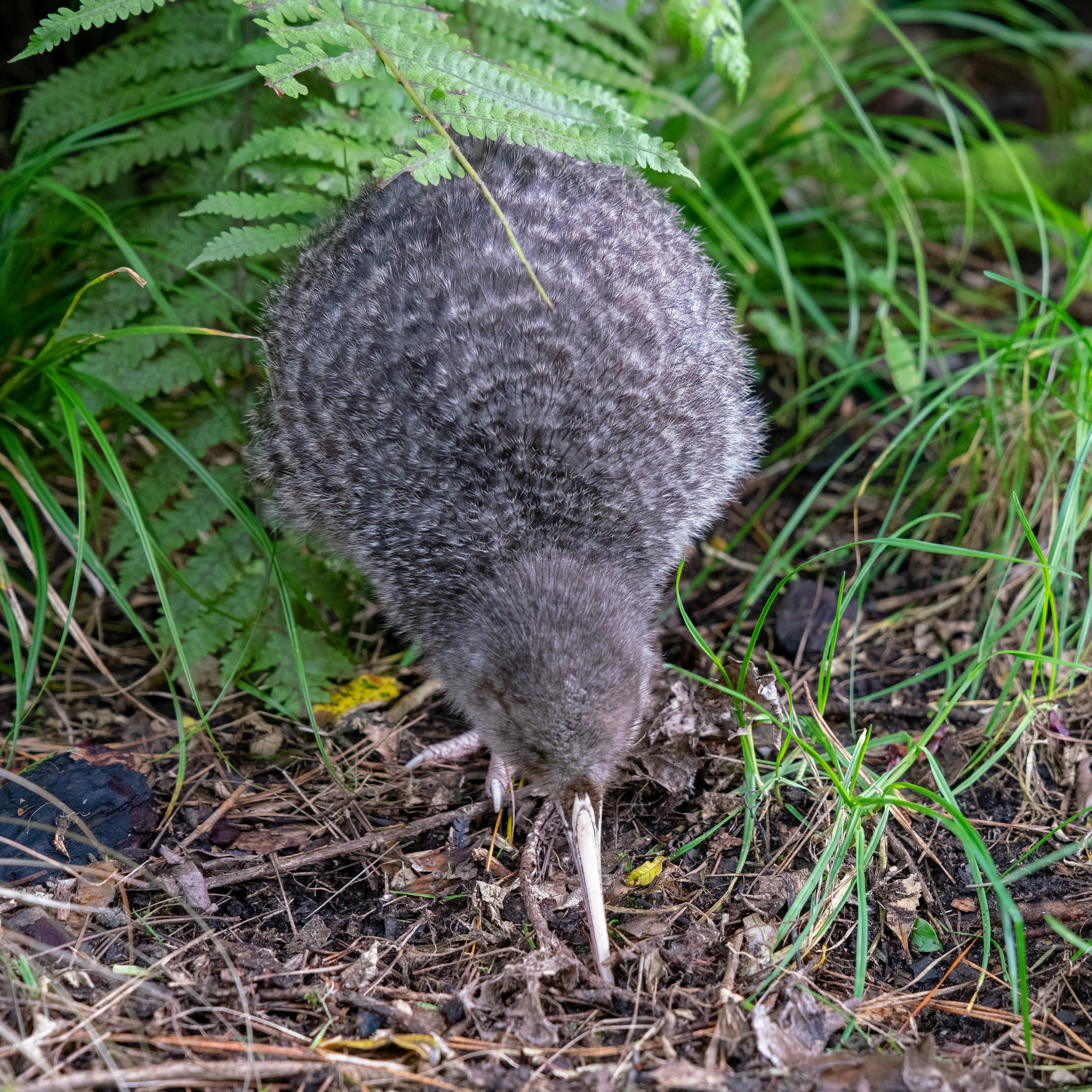
Little spotted kiwi

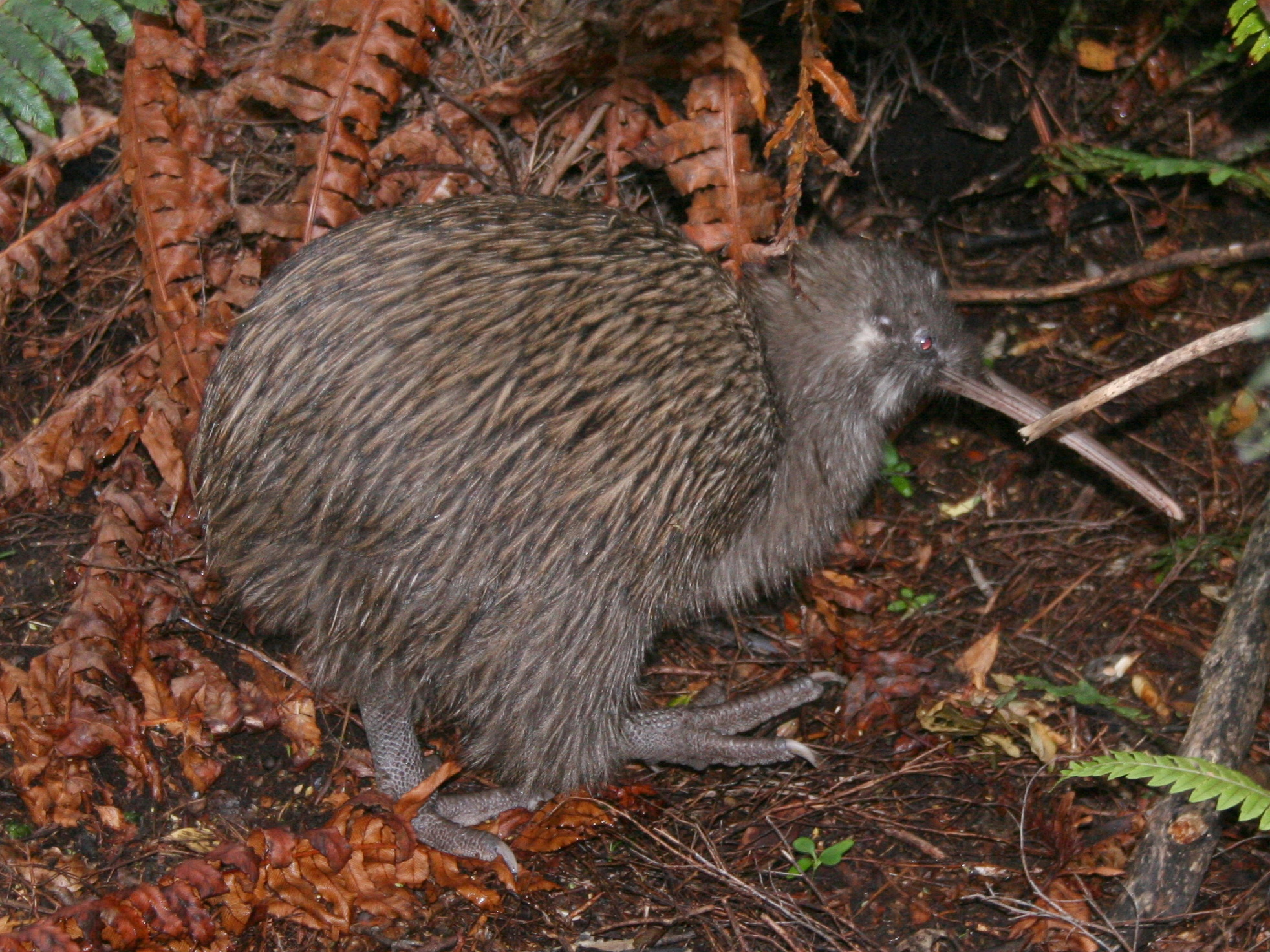
Southern brown kiwi

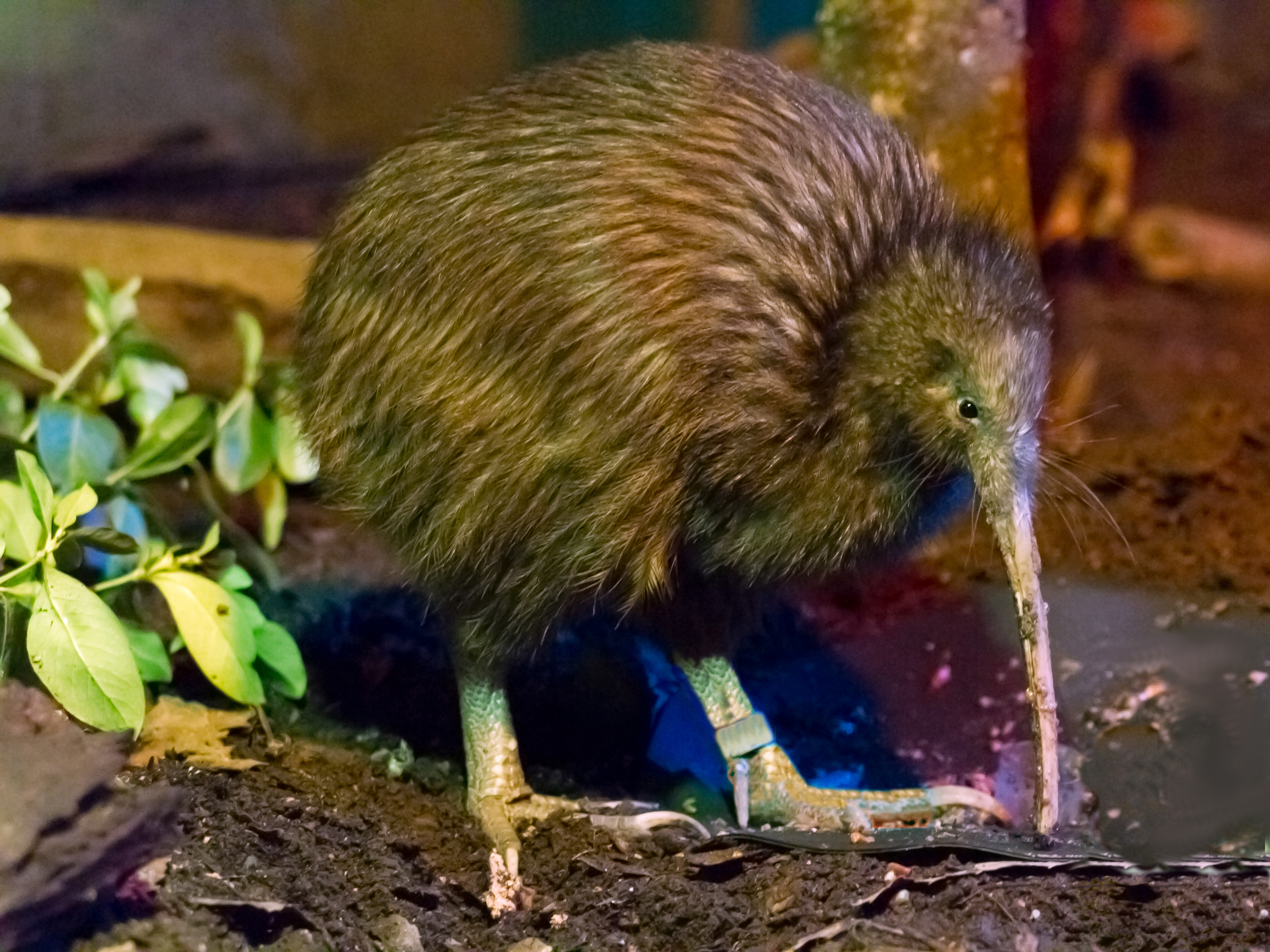
North Island brown kiwi

== Giant moa ==
Order: Dinornithiformes Family: Dinornithidae

The giant moa (Dinornis) is an extinct genus of birds belonging to the moa family. As with other moa, it was a member of the order Dinornithiformes. It was endemic to New Zealand. Two species of Dinornis are considered valid, the North Island giant moa (Dinornis novaezealandiae) and the South Island giant moa (Dinornis robustus). In addition, two further species (new lineage A and lineage B) have been suggested based on distinct DNA lineages.

Species	Kermadecs	North I	South I	Stewart	Chathams	Snares	Auckland	Campbell	Antipodes	Bounty
North Island giant moa Dinornis novaezealandiae		X								
South Island giant moa Dinornis robustus			X	X						

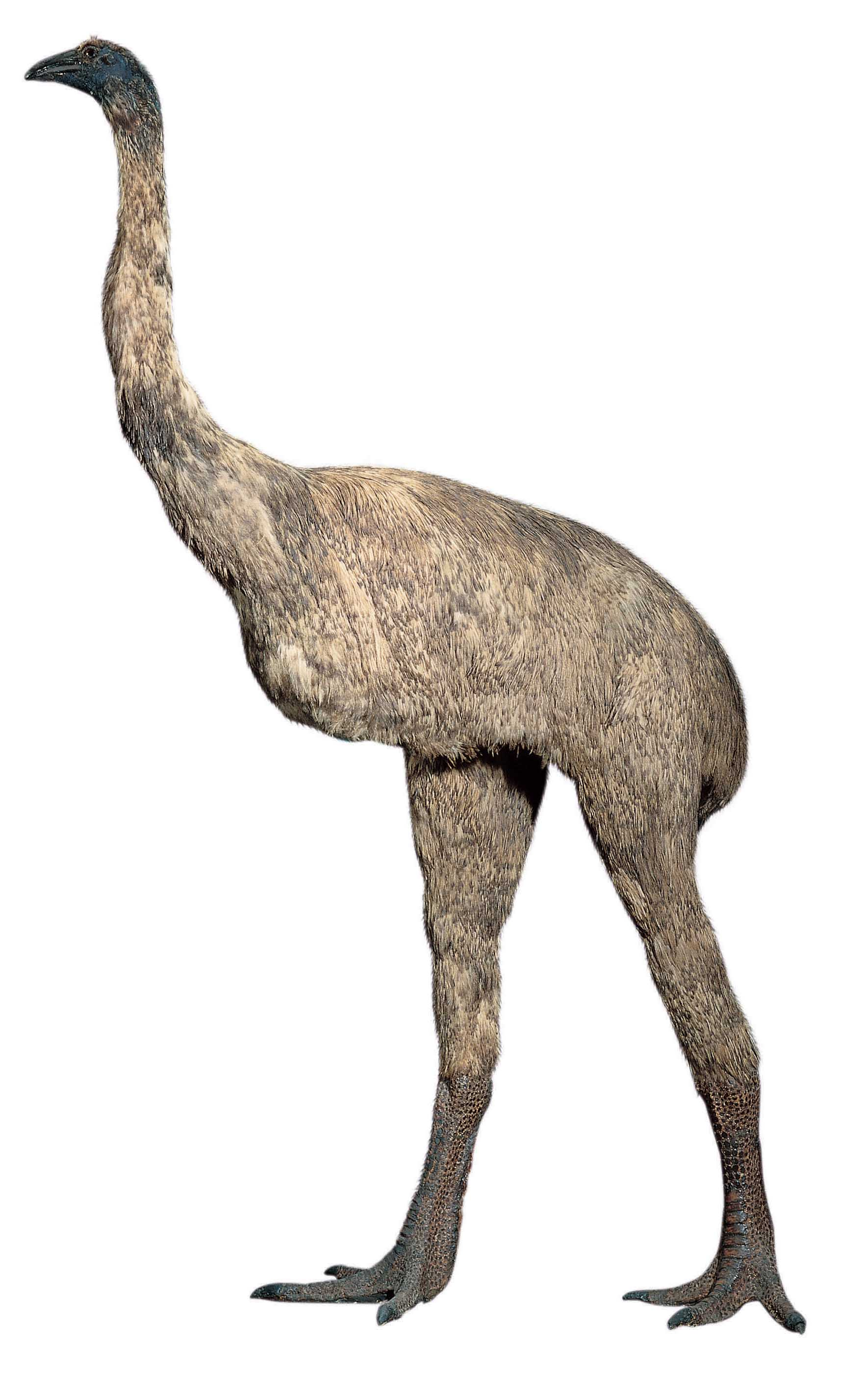
South Island giant moa (extinct)

== Lesser moa ==
Order: Dinornithiformes Family: Emeidae

The lesser moa (family Emeidae) were a family of moa. The moa were ratites from New Zealand. About two-thirds of all moa species are in the lesser moa family.

Species	Kermadecs	North I	South I	Stewart	Chathams	Snares	Auckland	Campbell	Antipodes	Bounty
Bush moa Anomalopteryx didiformis		X	X							
Eastern moa Emeus crassus			X							
Broad-billed moa Euryapteryx curtus		X	X							
Heavy-footed moa Pachyornis elephantopus			X	X						
Mantell's moa Pachyornis geranoides		X								
Crested moa Pachyornis australis			X							

== Upland moa ==
Order: Dinornithiformes Family: Megalapterygidae

The upland moa (Megalapteryx didinus) was a species of moa endemic to New Zealand. It was a ratite, a grouping of flightless birds with no keel on the sternum. It was the last moa species to become extinct, vanishing in 1445 CE, and was predominantly found in alpine and sub-alpine environments.

Species	Kermadecs	North I	South I	Stewart	Chathams	Snares	Auckland	Campbell	Antipodes	Bounty
Upland moa Megalapteryx didinus			X							

== Ducks, geese, and swans ==
Order: Anseriformes Family: Anatidae

The family Anatidae includes the ducks and most duck-like waterfowl, such as geese and swans. These are adapted for an aquatic existence, with webbed feet, bills that are flattened to a greater or lesser extent, and feathers that are excellent at shedding water due to special oils. The Cape Barren goose is also recorded as an escape from captivity in New Zealand which has bred, as well as being a vagrant from Australia as set out in the table below.

Species	Kermadecs	North I	South I	Stewart	Chathams	Snares	Auckland	Campbell	Antipodes	Bounty
Plumed whistling-duck Dendrocygna eytoni		V	V		V					
Greylag goose Anser anser		I	I		I					
Canada goose Branta canadensis	V	I	I		V		V			
Cape Barren goose Cereopsis novaehollandiae		V	V							
North Island goose Cnemiornis gracilis		X								
South Island goose Cnemiornis calcitrans			X							
Mute swan Cygnus olor		I	I							
Black swan Cygnus atratus		I (Note: In 1864, the Australian black swan was introduced to New Zealand as an ornamental waterfowl. Black swans have also naturally flown to New Zealand, leading scientists to consider them a native rather than exotic species, although the present population appears to be largely descended from deliberate introductions. See the article black swan for details.)	I		I					
New Zealand swan (Māori: poūwa) Cygnus sumnerensis			X		X					
Australian shelduck Tadorna tadornoides	V	V	V	V	V	V	V	V		
Paradise shelduck (Māori: pūtangitangi) Tadorna variegata	V	B	B	B	V					
Australian wood duck Chenonetta jubata			V			V				
Finsch's duck Chenonetta finschi		X	X							
Blue duck (Māori: whio) Hymenolaimus malacorhynchos		B	B							
Australasian shoveler (Māori: kuruwhengi) Spatula rhynchotis		B	B	V	V	V	V			
Northern shoveler Spatula clypeata		V	V							
Pacific black duck or grey duck (Māori: pārera) Anas superciliosa	ex	B	B	V	V	ex	ex	ex		
Chatham duck Anas chathamica					X					
Domestic mallard Anas platyrhynchos	I	I	I	I	I	I	I	I		
Northern pintail Anas acuta			V							
Grey teal (Māori: tētē) Anas gracilis		B	B	V	V	V	V	V		
Chestnut teal Anas castanea		V	V							
Auckland teal Anas aucklandica							B			
Campbell teal Anas nesiotis								B		
Brown teal (Māori: pāteke) Anas chlorotis		B	B	ex	ex					
Scarlett's duck Malacorhynchus scarletti		X	X		X					
Pink-eared duck Malacorhynchus membranaceus		V								
Hardhead Aythya australis		V	V			V				
New Zealand scaup (Māori: pāpango) Aythya novaeseelandiae		B	B	ex	ex					
New Zealand musk duck Biziura delautouri		X	X							
Auckland Island merganser (Note: The species identity of merganser bones from mainland New Zealand - North, South, and Stewart Islands - is unresolved. See the article Auckland Island merganser for details.) Mergus australis							X			
Chatham merganser Mergus milleneri					X					
New Zealand stiff-tailed duck Oxyura vantetsi		X	X							

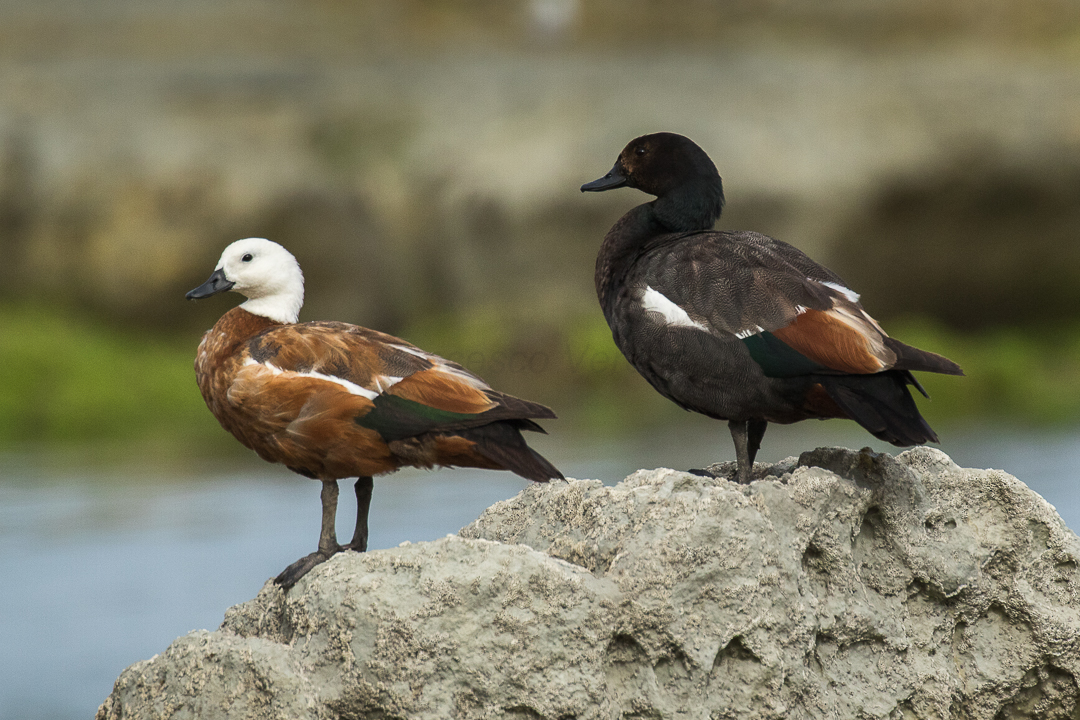
Paradise shelduck

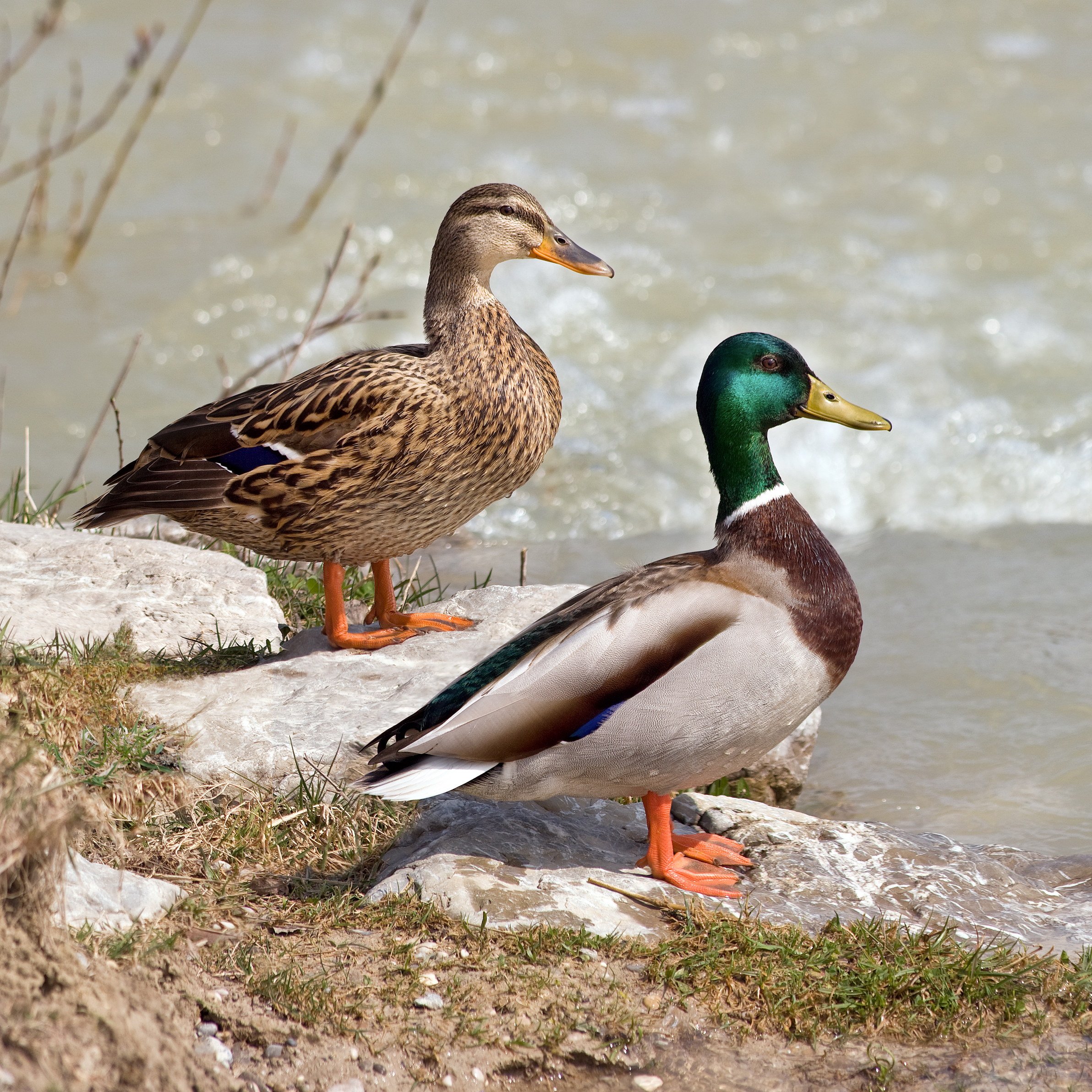
Mallard (introduced)

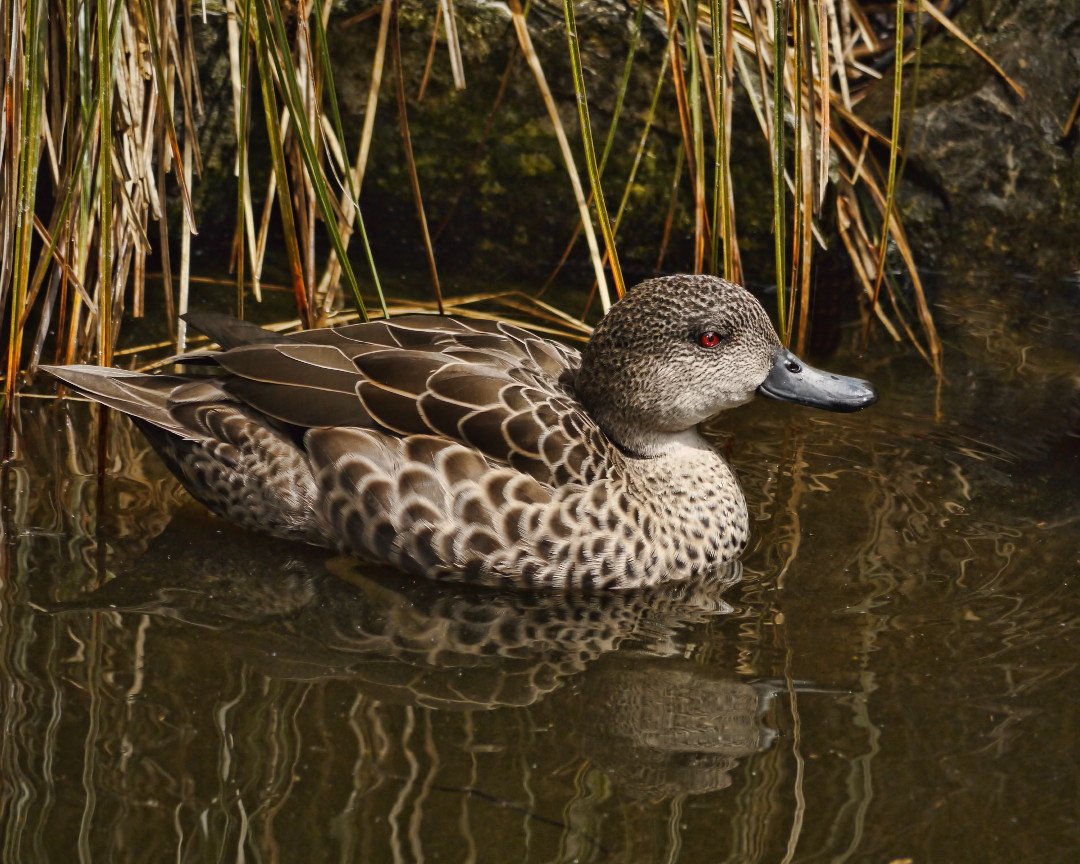
Grey teal

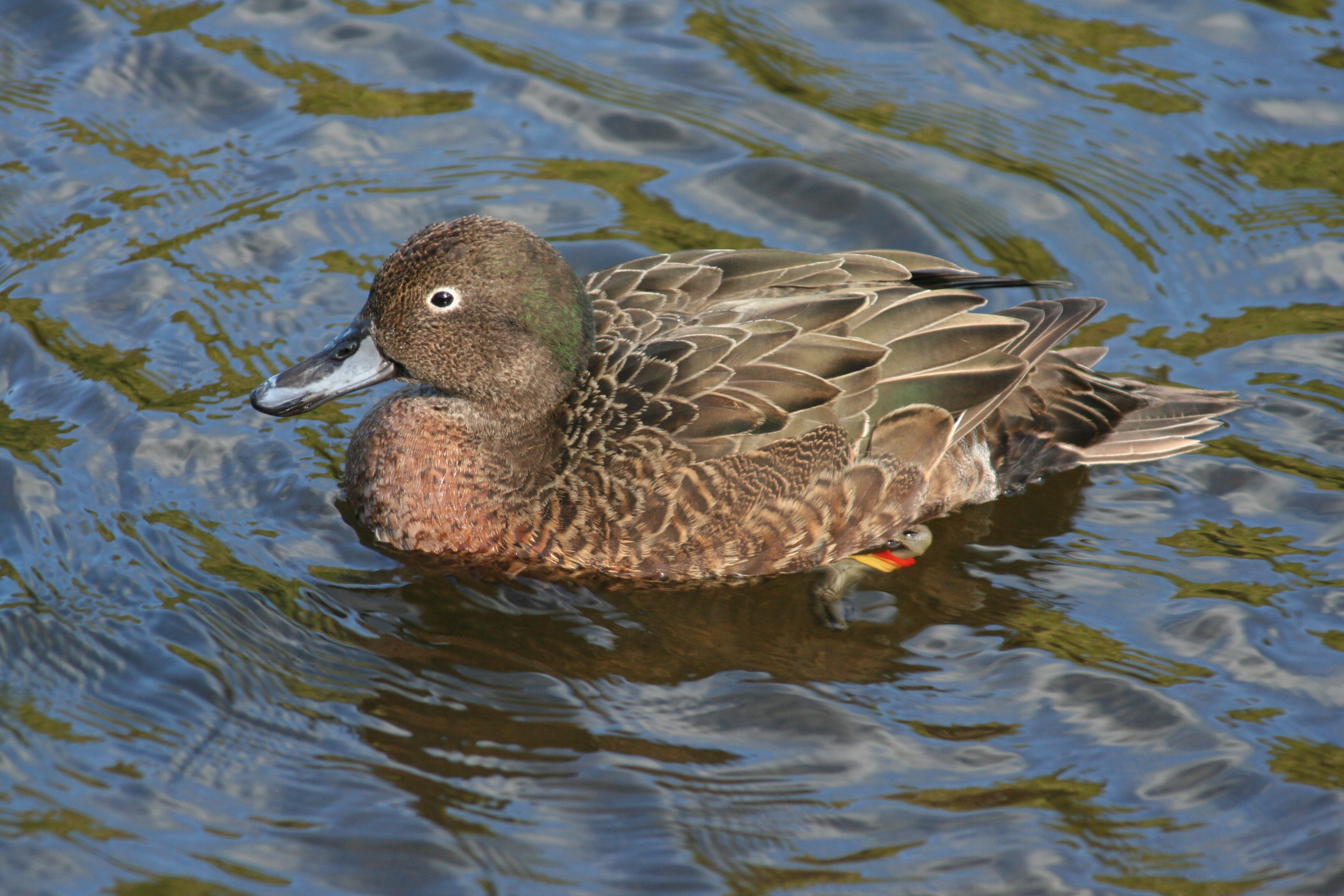
Brown teal

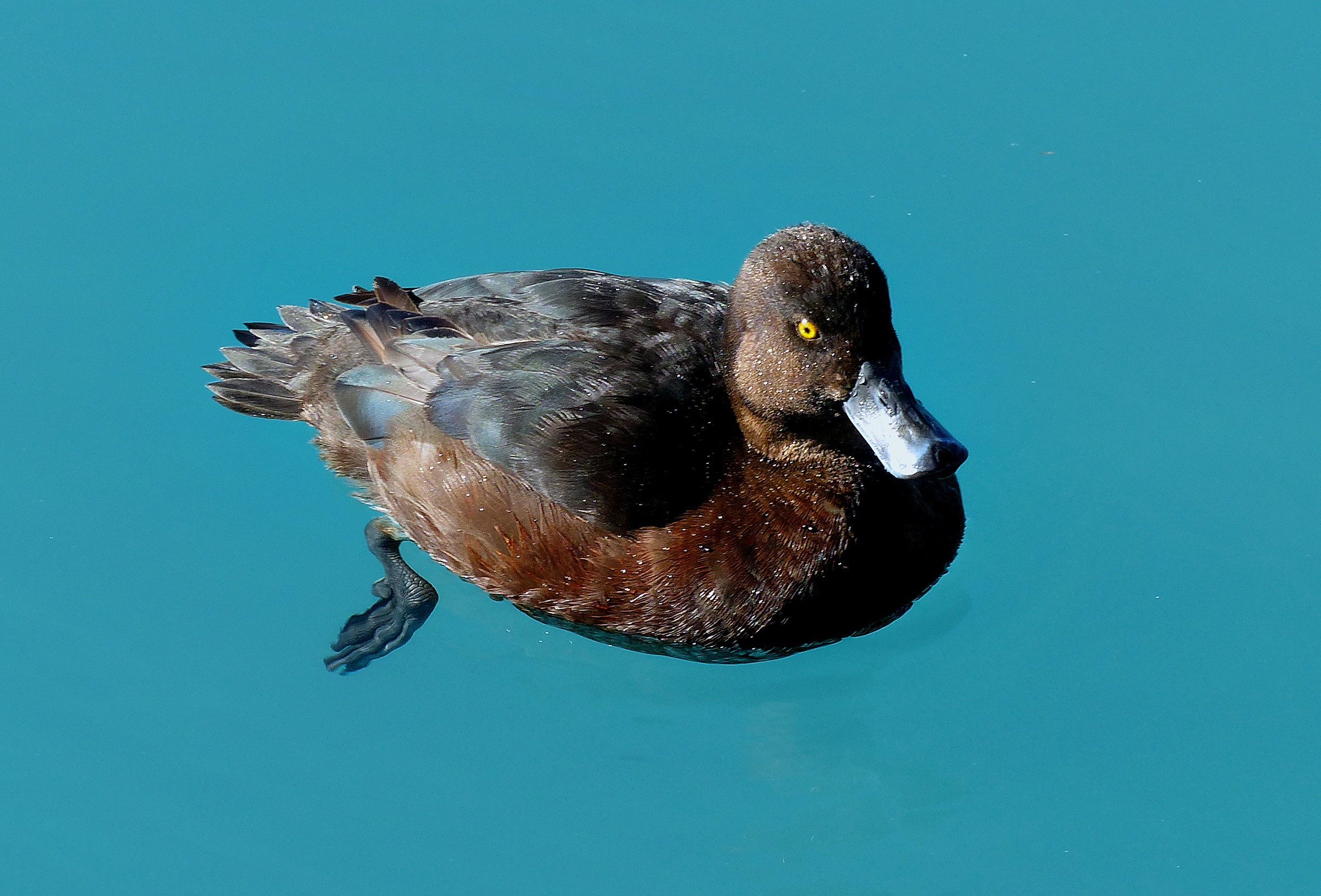
New Zealand scaup

== Guineafowl ==
Order: Galliformes Family: Numididae

The guineafowl are a family of birds native to Africa. They typically eat insects and seeds, are ground-nesting, and resemble partridges, except with featherless heads.

Species	Kermadecs	North I	South I	Stewart	Chathams	Snares	Auckland	Campbell	Antipodes	Bounty
Helmeted guineafowl Numida meleagris		I	I	I						

== New World quail ==
Order: Galliformes Family: Odontophoridae

The New World quails are small, plump terrestrial birds only distantly related to the quails of the Old World, but named for their similar appearance and habits.

Species	Kermadecs	North I	South I	Stewart	Chathams	Snares	Auckland	Campbell	Antipodes	Bounty
California quail Callipepla californica		I	I		I					

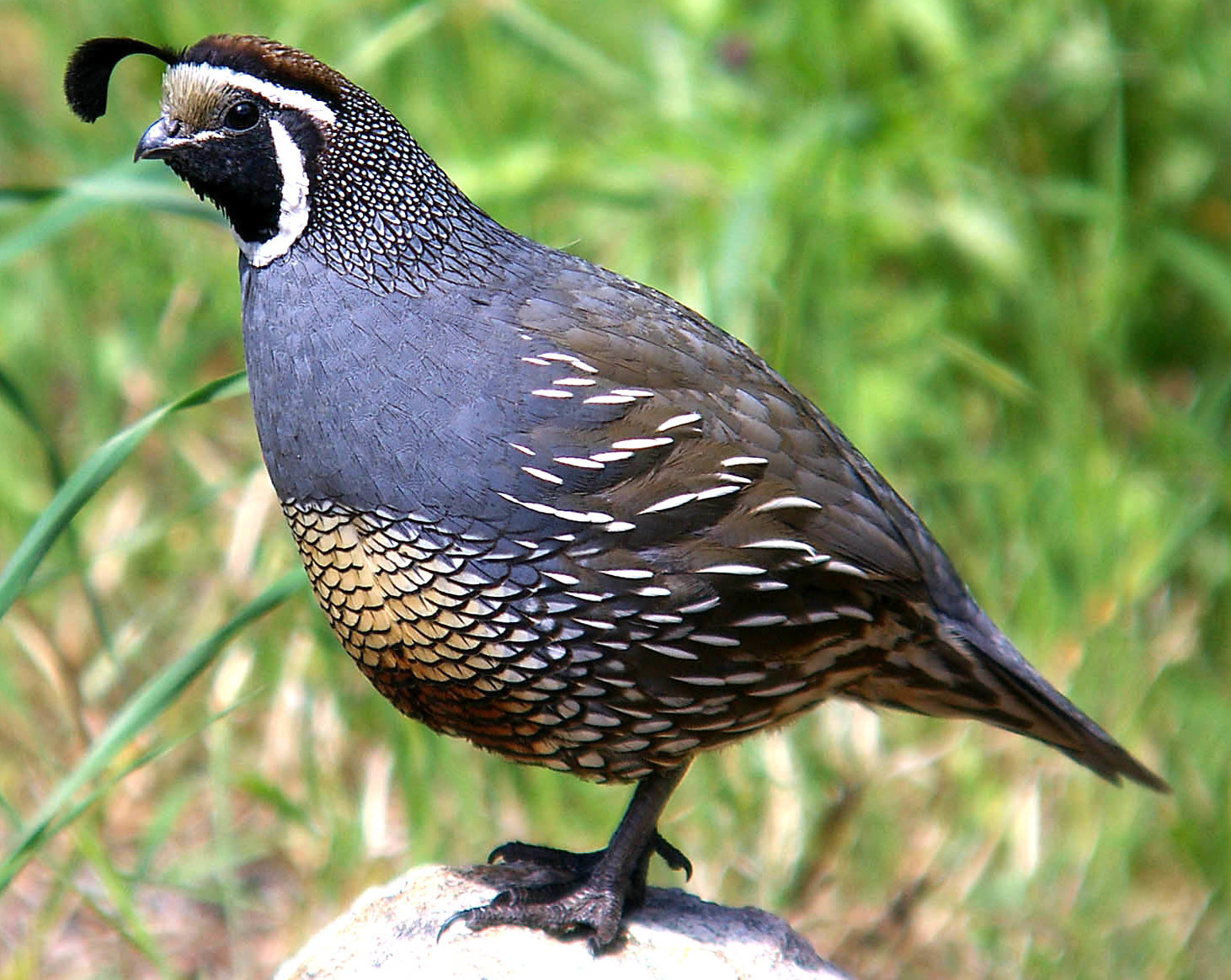
California quail (introduced)

== Megapodes ==
Order: Galliformes Family: Megapodiidae

The megapodes are stocky, medium-large, chicken-like birds with small heads and large feet. Their name literally means "large foot" and is a reference to the heavy legs and feet typical of these terrestrial birds. All are browsers, and all but the malleefowl occupy wooded habitats.

Species	Kermadecs	North I	South I	Stewart	Chathams	Snares	Auckland	Campbell	Antipodes	Bounty
Kermadec megapode Megapodius sp. nov. 'Raoul Island'	X									

== Pheasants and allies ==
Order: Galliformes Family: Phasianidae

Phasianidae consists of the pheasants and their allies. These are terrestrial species, variable in size but generally plump, with broad, relatively short wings. Many species are gamebirds or have been domesticated as a food source for humans.

Species	Kermadecs	North I	South I	Stewart	Chathams	Snares	Auckland	Campbell	Antipodes	Bounty
Indian peafowl Pavo cristatus		I	I							
Brown quail Synoicus ypsilophorus		I								
New Zealand quail (Māori: koreke) Coturnix novaezelandiae		X	X							
Chukar partridge Alectoris chukar			I							
Red-legged partridge Alectoris rufa		I	I							
Red junglefowl Gallus gallus			I							
Common pheasant Phasianus colchicus		I	I							
Wild turkey Meleagris gallopavo		I	I							

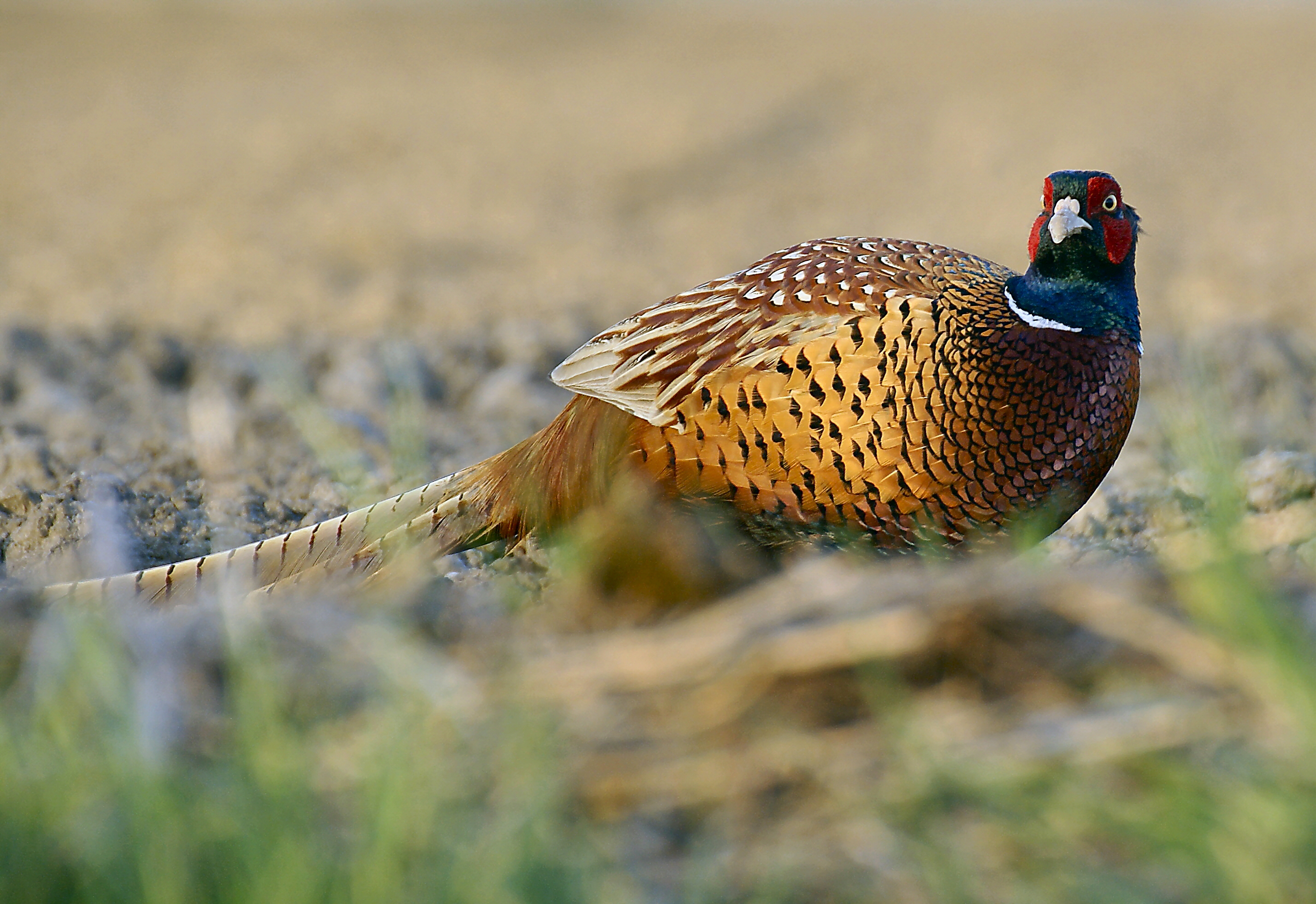
Ring-necked pheasant (introduced)

== Grebes ==
Order: Podicipediformes Family: Podicipedidae

Grebes are small to medium-large freshwater diving birds. They have lobed toes and are excellent swimmers and divers. However, they have their feet placed far back on the body, making them quite ungainly on land.

Species	Kermadecs	North I	South I	Stewart	Chathams	Snares	Auckland	Campbell	Antipodes	Bounty
Australasian grebe Tachybaptus novaehollandiae		B	P							
Hoary-headed grebe Poliocephalus poliocephalus		V	V	V		V				
New Zealand grebe Poliocephalus rufopectus		B	V							
Great crested grebe Podiceps cristatus		V	B							

== Pigeons and doves ==
Order: Columbiformes Family: Columbidae

Pigeons and doves are stout-bodied birds with short necks and short slender bills with a fleshy cere.

Species	Kermadecs	North I	South I	Stewart	Chathams	Snares	Auckland	Campbell	Antipodes	Bounty
Rock dove or common pigeon Columba livia		I	I	I	V	V	V			
Kererū or New Zealand pigeon (Māori: kererū) Hemiphaga novaeseelandiae		B	B	B						
Chatham islands pigeon (Māori: parea) Hemiphaga chathamensis					B					
Spotted dove Streptopelia chinensis		I								
Barbary dove Streptopelia risoria		I	I							
Rose-crowned fruit dove Ptilinopus regina		V								

== Cuckoos ==
Order: Cuculiformes Family: Cuculidae

The family Cuculidae includes cuckoos, roadrunners and anis. These birds are of variable size with slender bodies, long tails and strong legs. The Old World cuckoos are brood parasites.

Species	Kermadecs	North I	South I	Stewart	Chathams	Snares	Auckland	Campbell	Antipodes	Bounty
Long-tailed koel (Māori: koekoeā) Urodynamis taitensis	P	B	B		P	P	P			
Channel-billed cuckoo Scythrops novaehollandiae		V	V							
Shining bronze-cuckoo (Māori: pīpīwharauroa) Chrysococcyx lucidus	P	B	B	B	B	P	P			
Pallid cuckoo Cacomantis pallidus		V	V							
Fan-tailed cuckoo Cacomantis flabelliformis		V	V							
Oriental cuckoo Cuculus optatus	V	V	V	V		V				

== Owlet-nightjars ==
Order: Caprimulgiformes Family: Aegothelidae

The owlet-nightjars are a distinctive group of small nocturnal birds related to swifts found from the Maluku Islands and New Guinea to Australia and New Caledonia.

Species	Kermadecs	North I	South I	Stewart	Chathams	Snares	Auckland	Campbell	Antipodes	Bounty
New Zealand owlet-nightjar Aegotheles novaezealandiae		X	X							

== Swifts ==
Order: Caprimulgiformes Family: Apodidae

Swifts are small birds which spend the majority of their lives flying. These birds have very short legs and never settle voluntarily on the ground, perching instead only on vertical surfaces. Many swifts have long swept-back wings which resemble a crescent or boomerang.

Species	Kermadecs	North I	South I	Stewart	Chathams	Snares	Auckland	Campbell	Antipodes	Bounty
White-throated needletail Hirandapus caudacutus	P	P	P	P	P	P				
Pacific swift Apus pacificus		V	V		V		V			

== Adzebills ==
Order: Gruiformes Family: Aptornithidae

The adzebills, genus Aptornis, were two closely related bird species of the extinct family Aptornithidae.

Species	Kermadecs	North I	South I	Stewart	Chathams	Snares	Auckland	Campbell	Antipodes	Bounty
North Island adzebill Aptornis otidiformis		X								
South Island adzebill Aptornis defossor			X							

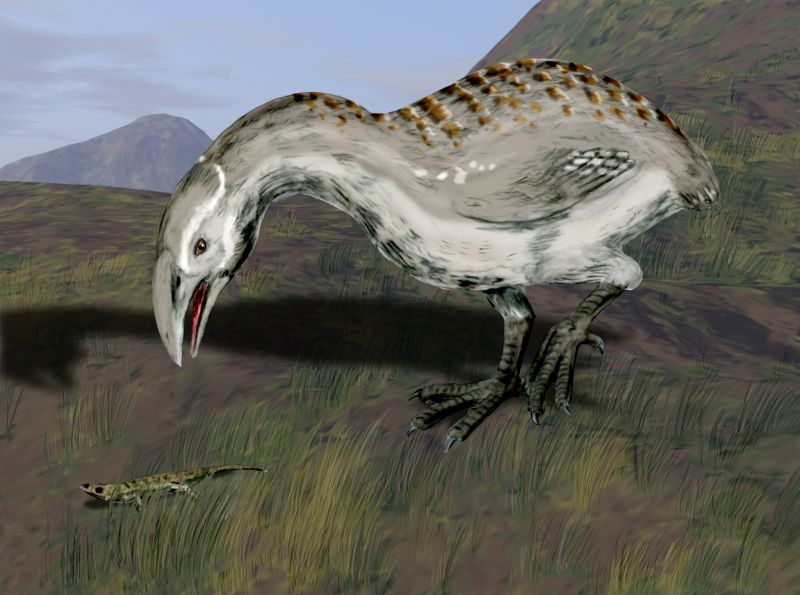
North Island adzebill (extinct)

== Rails ==
Order: Gruiformes Family: Rallidae

Rallidae is a large family of small to medium-sized birds which includes the rails, crakes, coots and gallinules. The most typical family members occupy dense vegetation in damp environments near lakes, swamps or rivers. In general they are shy and secretive birds, making them difficult to observe. Most species have strong legs and long toes which are well adapted to soft uneven surfaces. They tend to have short, rounded wings and to be weak fliers.

Species	Kermadecs	North I	South I	Stewart	Chathams	Snares	Auckland	Campbell	Antipodes	Bounty
Corn crake Crex crex		V								
Auckland rail Lewinia muelleri							B			
Weka Gallirallus australis		B	B	B	I					
Buff-banded rail Gallirallus philippensis		B	B	B						
Chatham rail Cabalus modestus					X					
Dieffenbach's rail Hypotaenidia dieffenbachii					X					
Snipe-rail Capellirallus karamu		X								
Hawkins's rail Diaphorapteryx hawkinsi					X					
Black-tailed nativehen Tribonyx ventralis		V	V							
Hodgens' waterhen Tribonyx hodgenorum		X	X							
Australian crake Porzana fluminea		V								
Eurasian moorhen Gallinula chloropus			V							
Dusky moorhen Gallinula tenebrosa			V							
New Zealand coot Fulica prisca		X	X							
Eurasian coot Fulica atra		B	B							
Chatham coot Fulica chathamensis					X					
North Island takahē Porphyrio mantelli		X								
South Island takahē Porphyrio hochstetteri			B							
Australasian swamphen or pūkeko (Māori: pūkeko) Porphyrio melanotus	I (Note: The pūkeko is probably an introduced species. All known fossils of pūkeko in New Zealand are less than 400 years old, and the Māori state that their ancestors brought these birds to New Zealand in canoes. See the article Australasian swamphen for details.)	I	I	I	I			V		
Marsh crake Zapornia pusilla		B	B	B	B					
Spotless crake Zapornia tabuensis	B	B	B		ex					

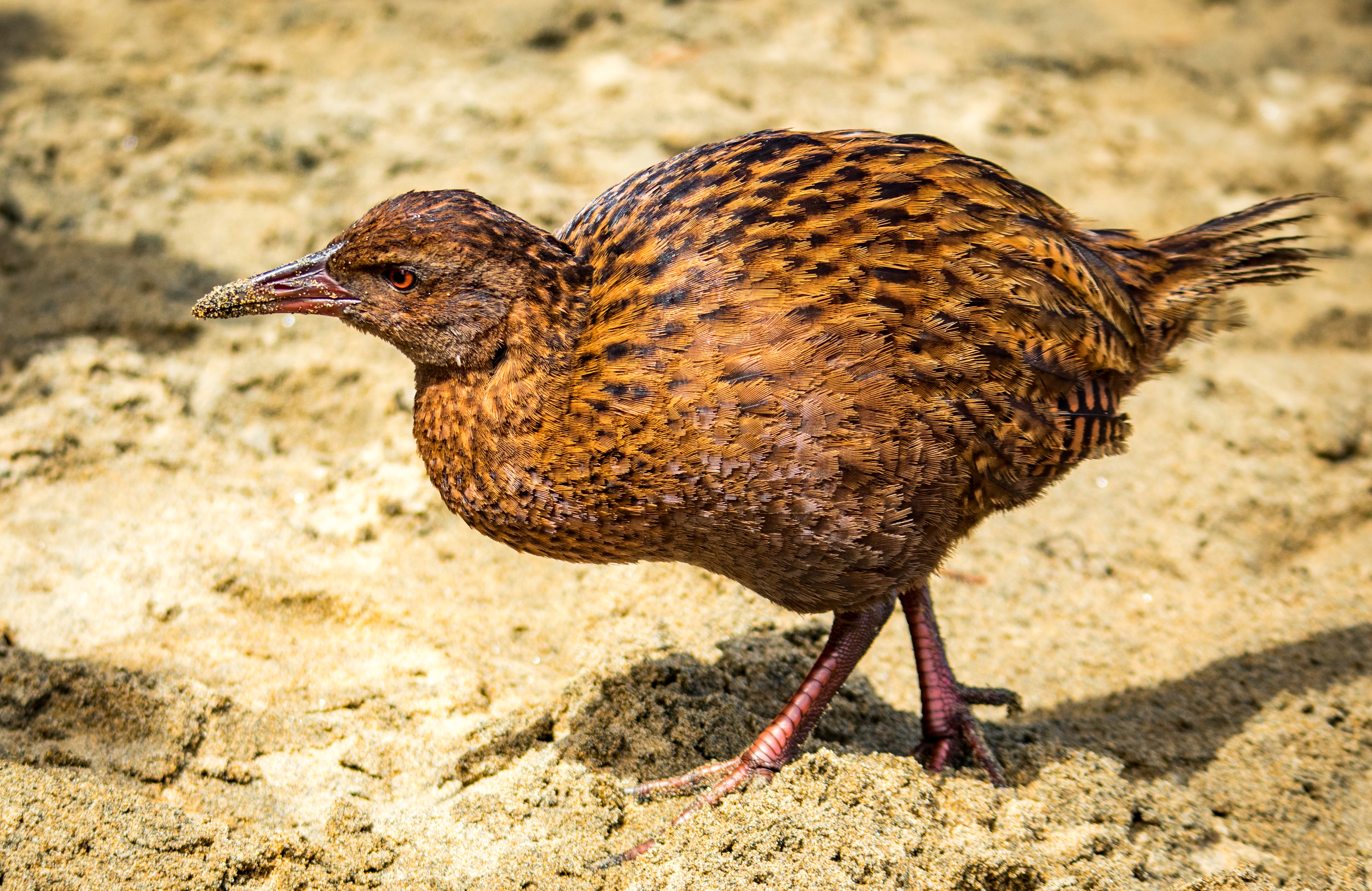
Weka

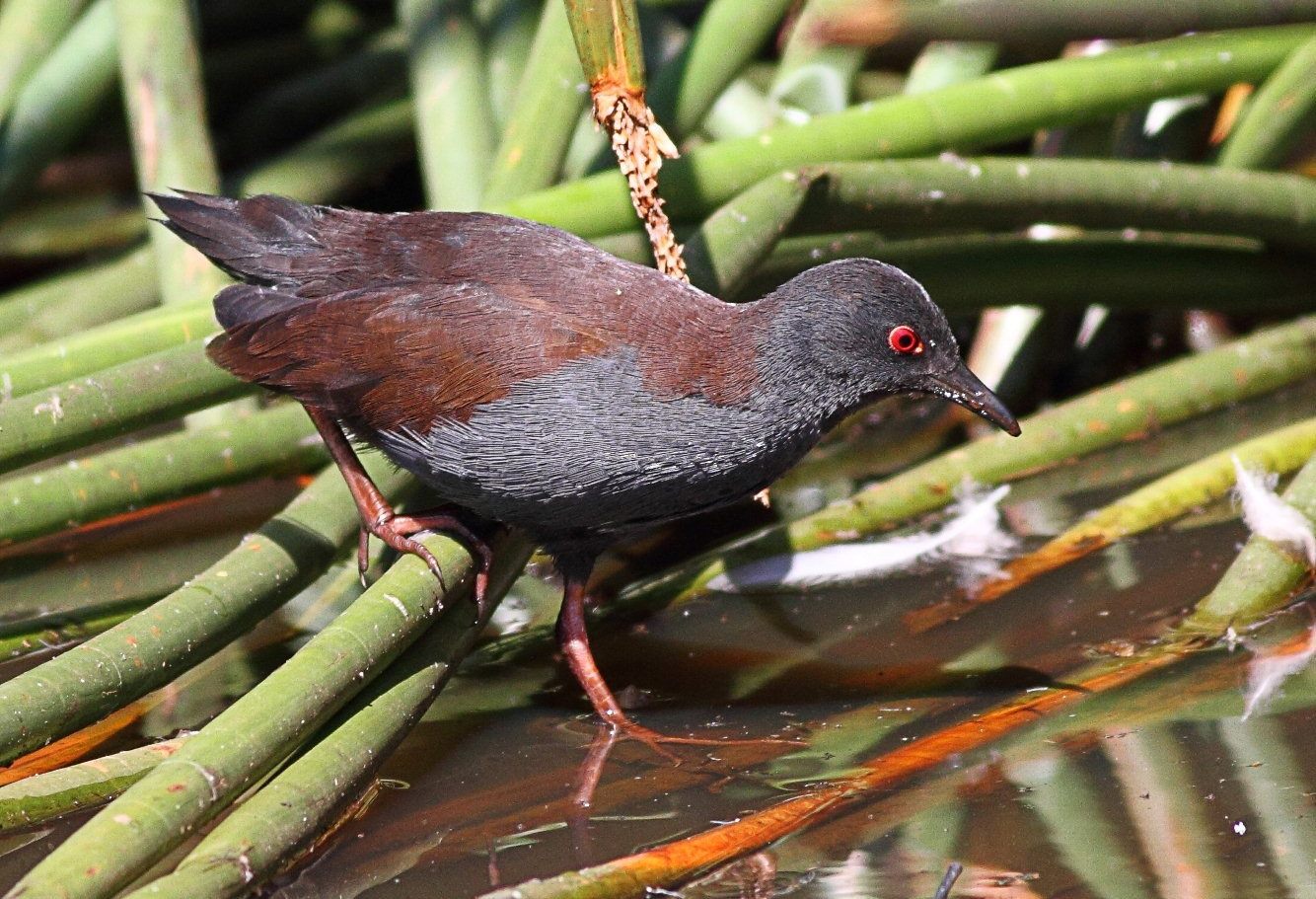
Spotless crake

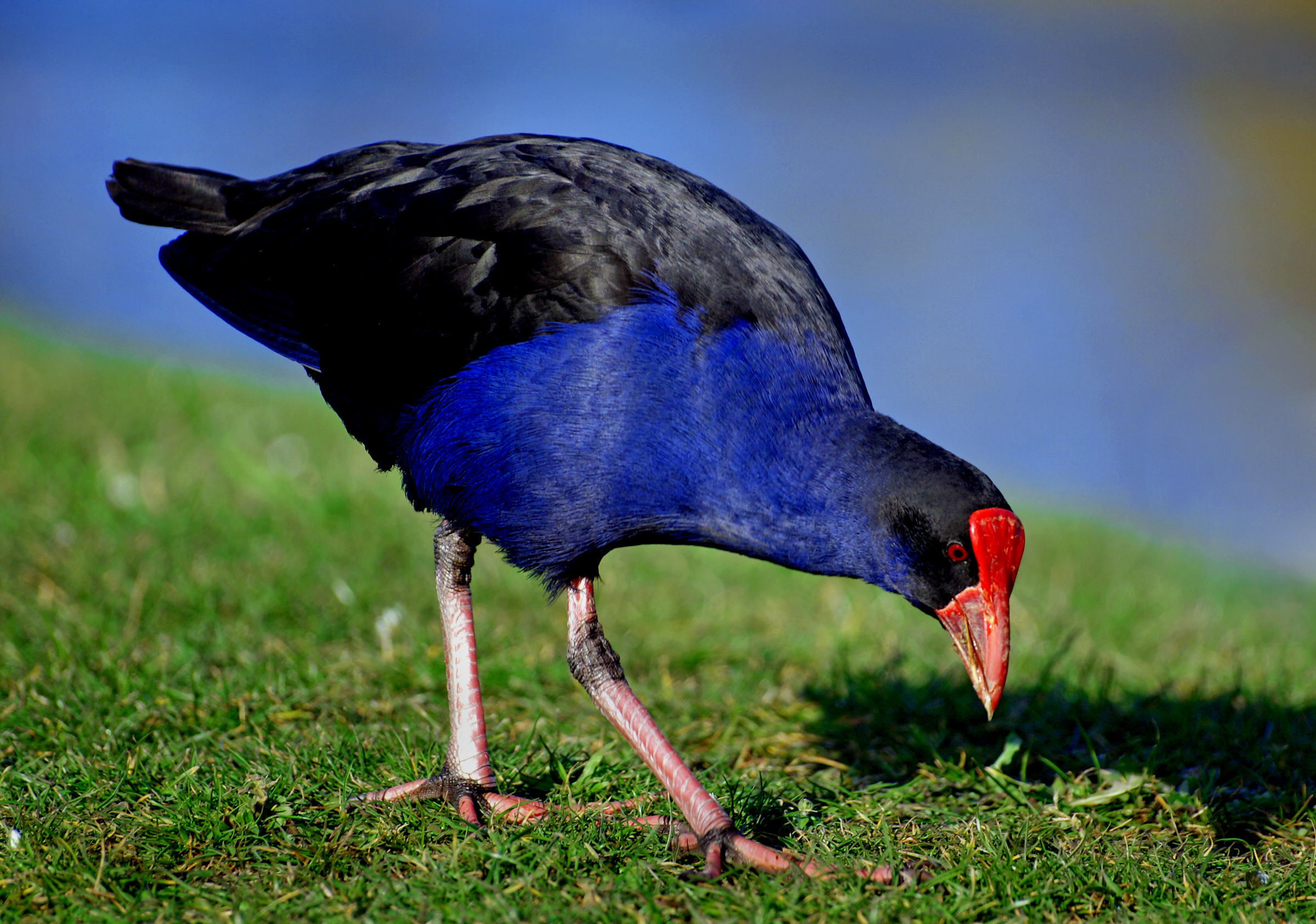
Pūkeko

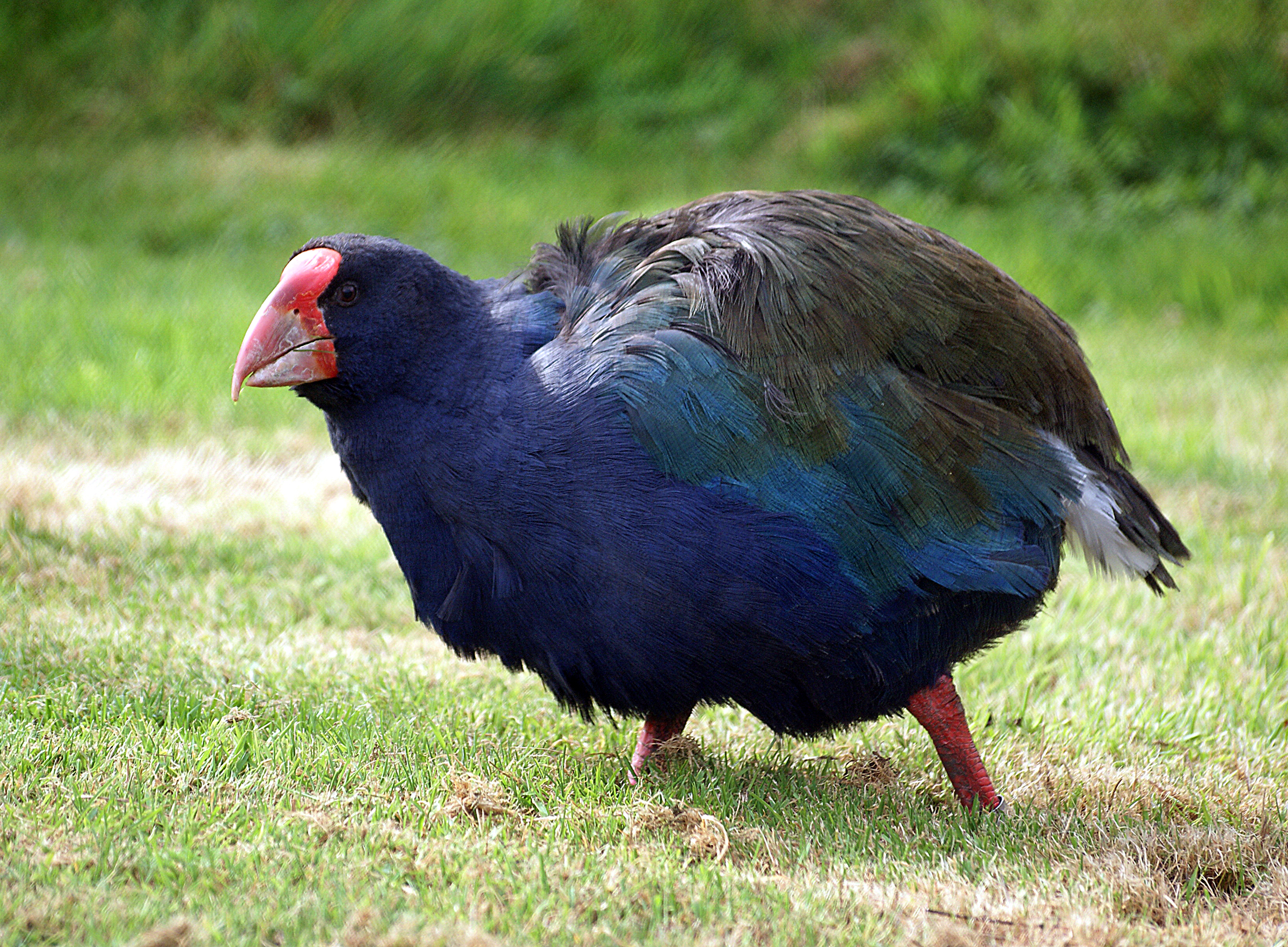
South Island takahē

== Cranes ==
Order: Gruiformes Family: Gruidae

Cranes are large, long-legged and long-necked birds. Unlike the similar-looking but unrelated herons, cranes fly with necks outstretched, not pulled back. Most have elaborate and noisy courting displays or "dances".

Species	Kermadecs	North I	South I	Stewart	Chathams	Snares	Auckland	Campbell	Antipodes	Bounty
Brolga Antigone rubicunda		V	V							

== Stilts and avocets ==
Order: Charadriiformes Family: Recurvirostridae

Recurvirostridae is a family of large wading birds, which includes the avocets and stilts. The avocets have long legs and long up-curved bills. The stilts have extremely long legs and long, thin, straight bills.

Species	Kermadecs	North I	South I	Stewart	Chathams	Snares	Auckland	Campbell	Antipodes	Bounty
Pied stilt (Māori: poaka) Himantopus leucocephalus		B	B	B						
Black stilt (Māori: kakī) Himantopus novaezelandiae		P	B							
Red-necked avocet Recurvirostra novaehollandiae		V	V							

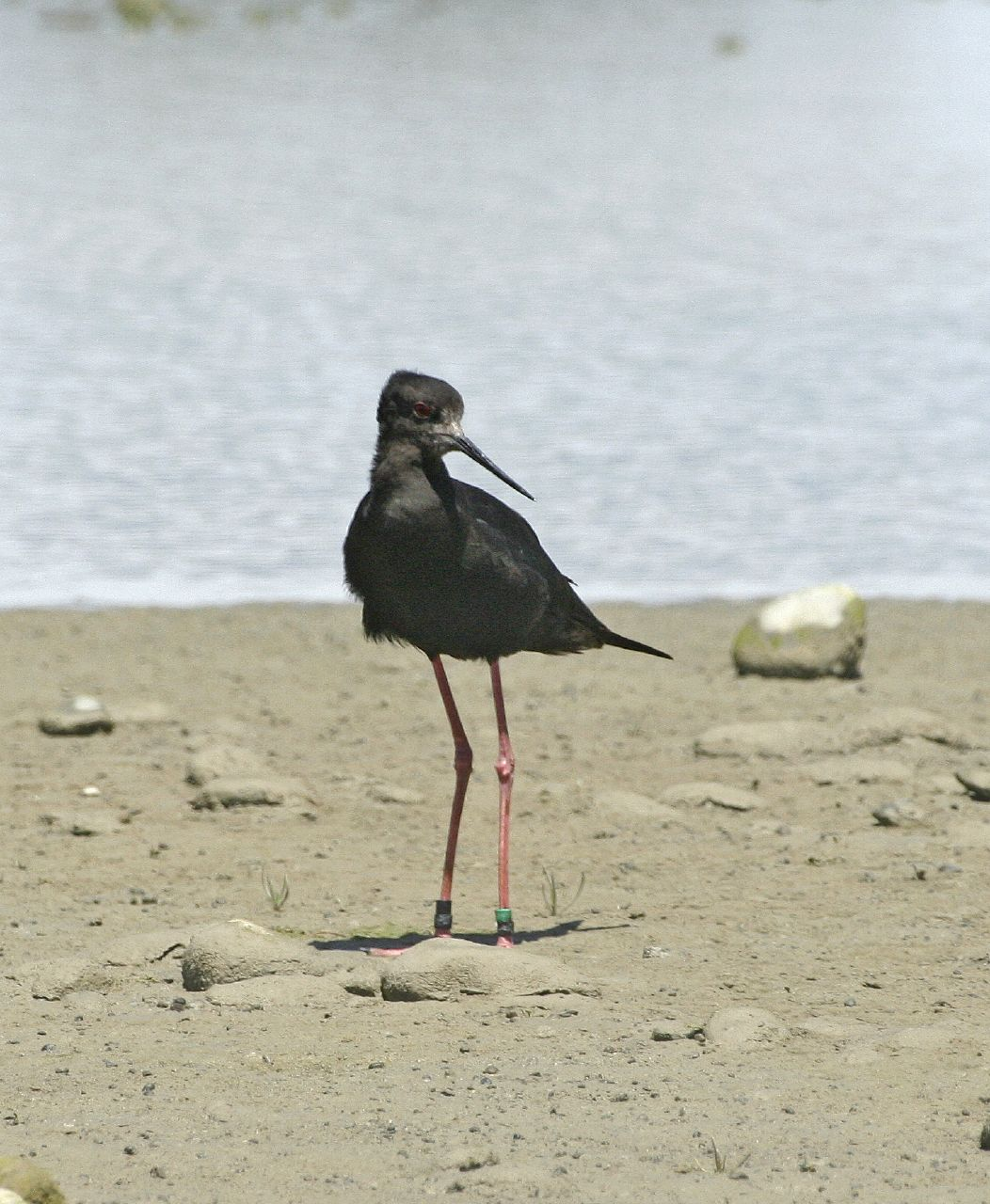
Black stilt

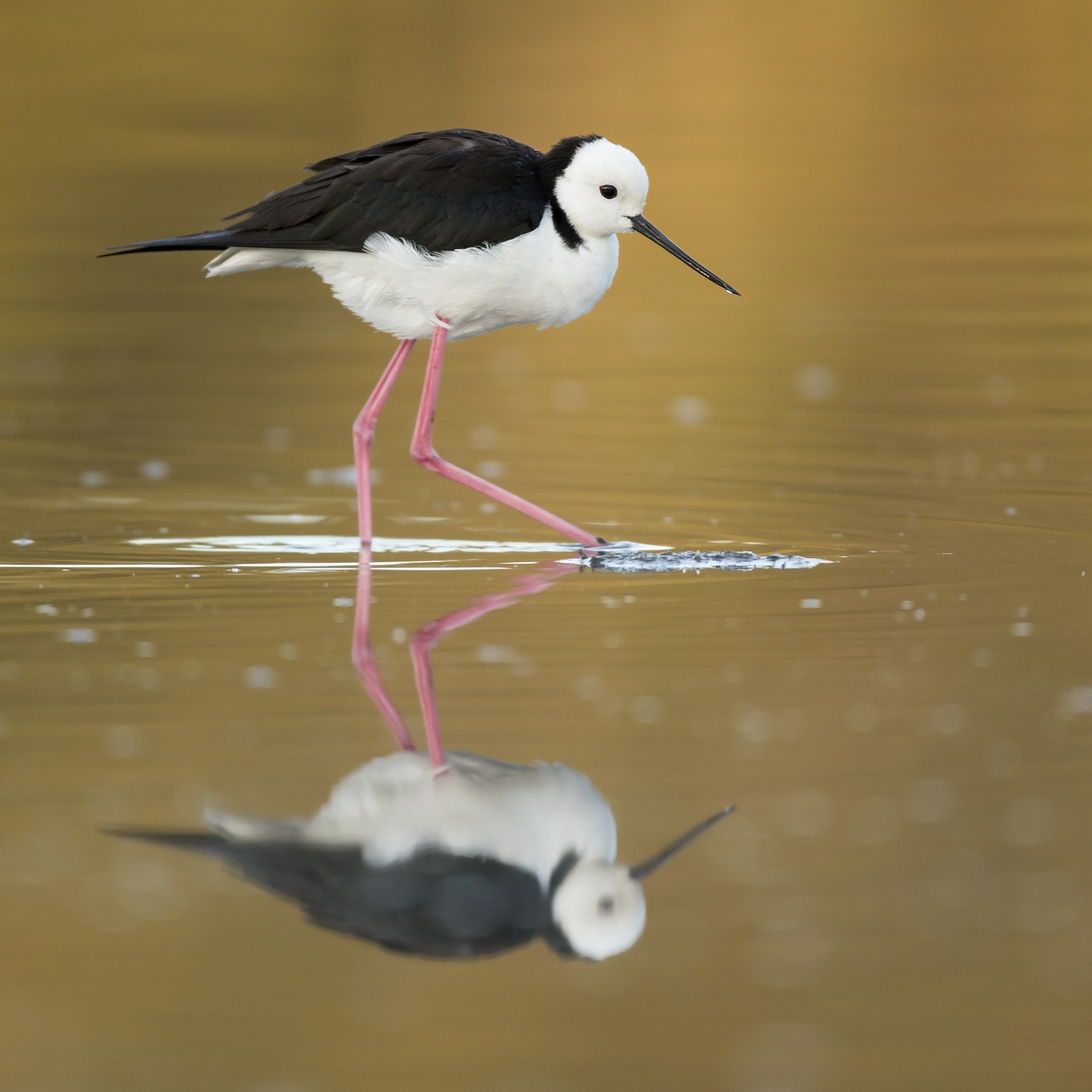
Pied stilt

== Oystercatchers ==
Order: Charadriiformes Family: Haematopodidae

The oystercatchers are large, obvious and noisy plover-like birds, with strong bills used for smashing or prying open molluscs.

Species	Kermadecs	North I	South I	Stewart	Chathams	Snares	Auckland	Campbell	Antipodes	Bounty
South Island oystercatcher (Māori: tōrea) Haematopus finschi	V	P	B	P	V	V	V	V		
Chatham oystercatcher Haematopus chathamensis					B					
Variable oystercatcher (Māori: tōrea pango) Haematopus unicolor		B	B	B						

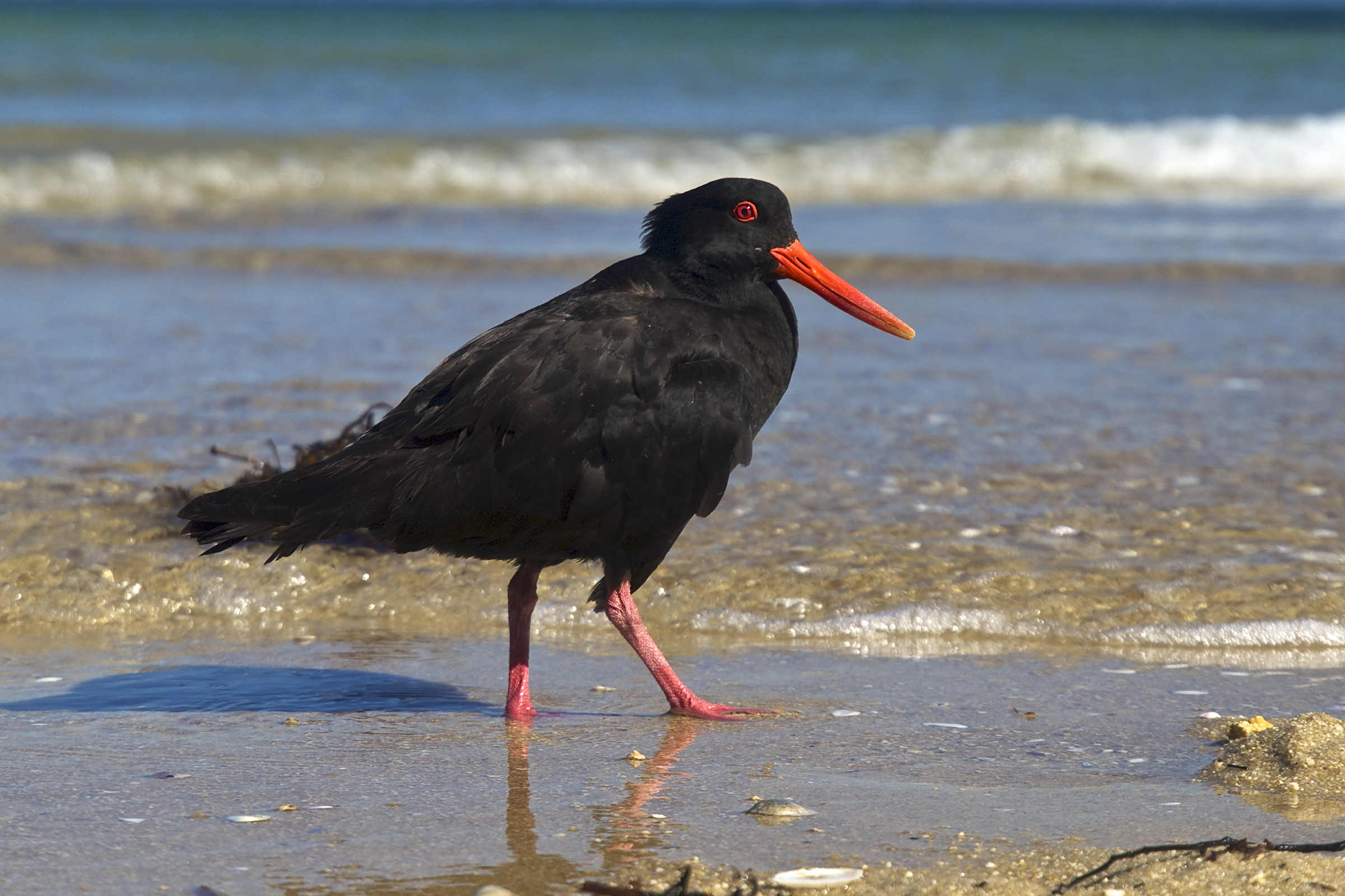
Variable oystercatcher

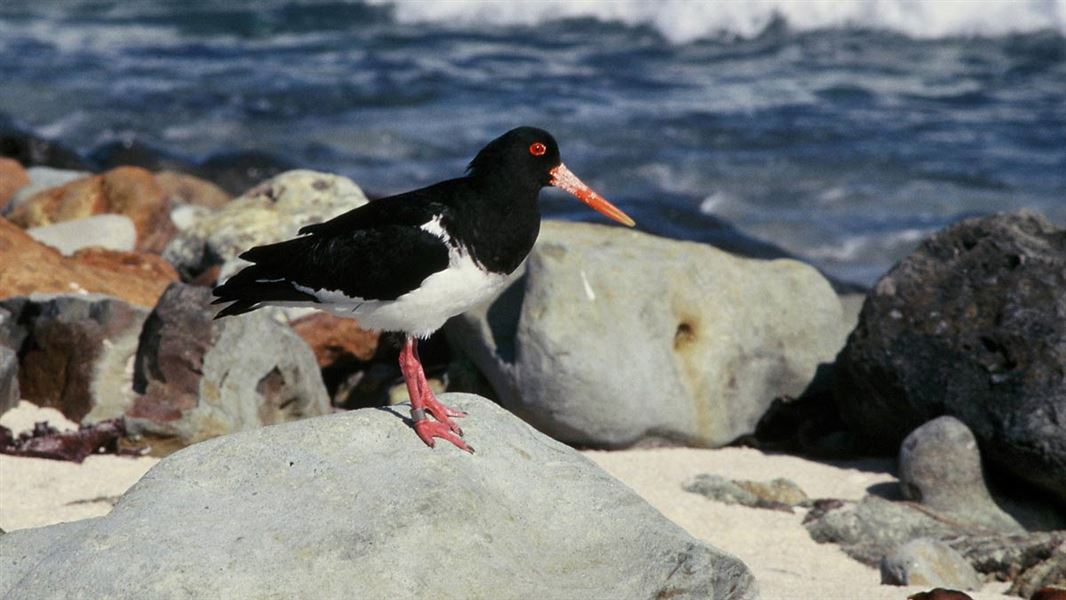
Chatham oystercatcher

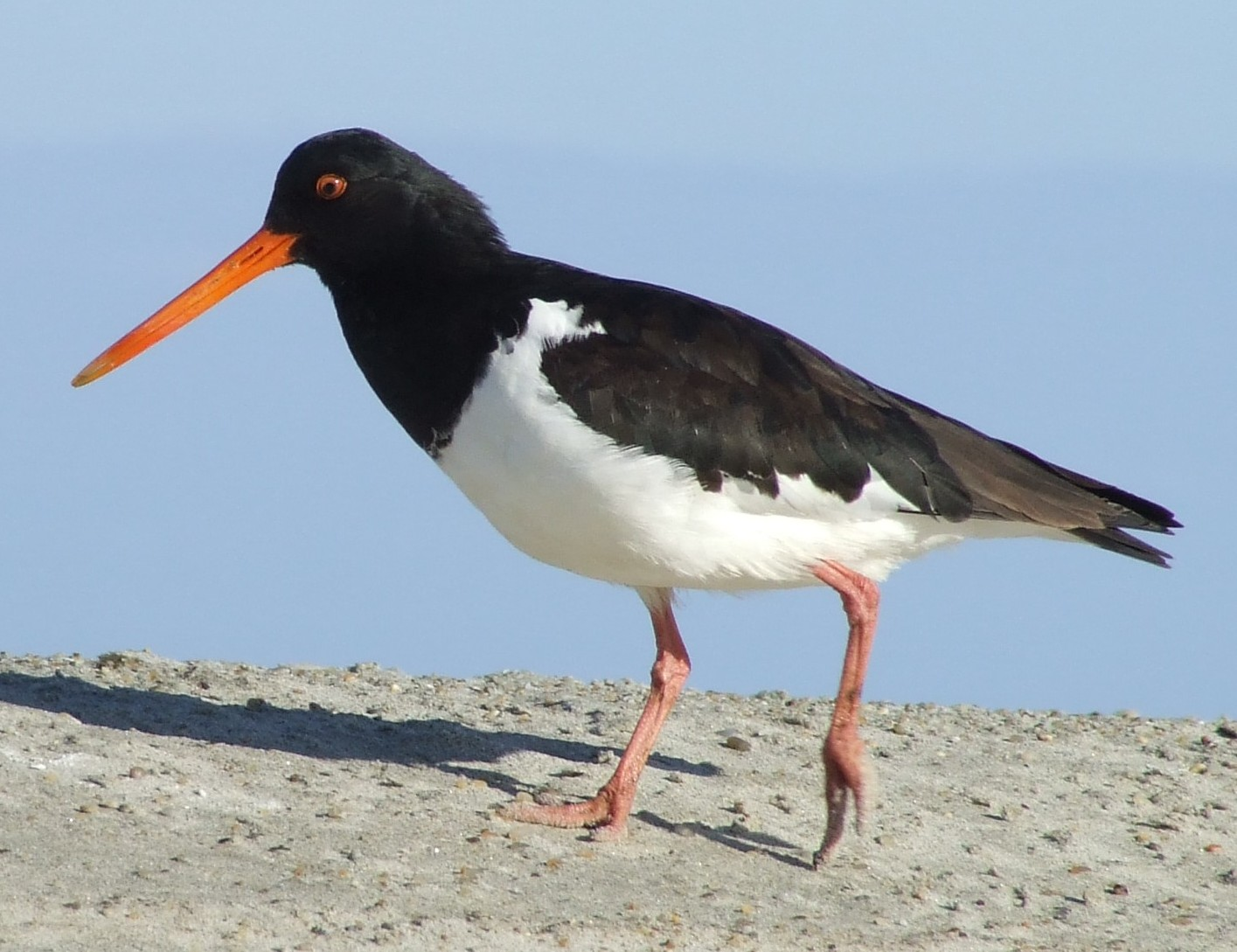
South Island oystercatcher

== Plovers and lapwings ==
Order: Charadriiformes Family: Charadriidae

The family Charadriidae includes the plovers, dotterels and lapwings. They are small to medium-sized birds with compact bodies, short, thick necks and long, usually pointed, wings. They are found in open country worldwide, mostly in habitats near water.

Species	Kermadecs	North I	South I	Stewart	Chathams	Snares	Auckland	Campbell	Antipodes	Bounty
Grey plover Pluvialis squatarola	V	V	V		V					
American golden plover Pluvialis dominica		V								
Pacific golden plover Pluvialis fulva	P	P	P	P	P		V			
Masked lapwing or spur-wing plover Vanellus miles	V	B	B	B	B	V	V	V	V	
New Zealand dotterel (Māori: tūturiwhatu, pukunui, kūkuruatu) Charadrius obscurus		B	B	P						
Siberian sand plover Charadrius mongolus		P	P		V					
Greater sand plover Charadrius leschenaulti		P	P							
Double-banded plover or banded dotterel (Māori: pohowera) Charadrius bicinctus	V	B	B	B	B		B	P		
Red-capped plover Charadrius ruficapillus		V	V							
Common ringed plover Charadrius hiaticula		V								
Semipalmated plover Charadrius semipalmatus		V								
Oriental plover Charadrius veredus	V	V	V		V					
Red-kneed dotterel Erythrogonys cinctus		V								
Shore plover (Māori: tuturuatu) Thinornis novaeseelandiae		B	B	B	B					
Black-fronted dotterel Elseyornis melanops		B	B							
Wrybill (Māori: ngutu parore) Anarhynchus frontalis		P	B							

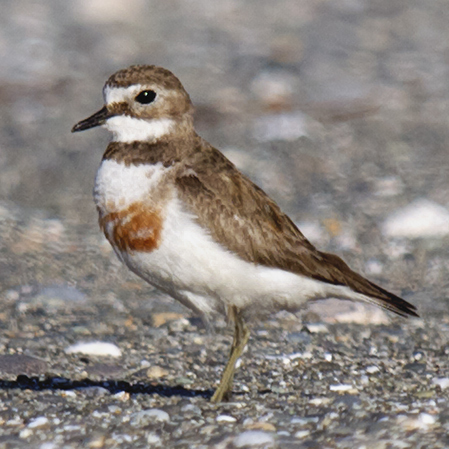
Double-banded plover

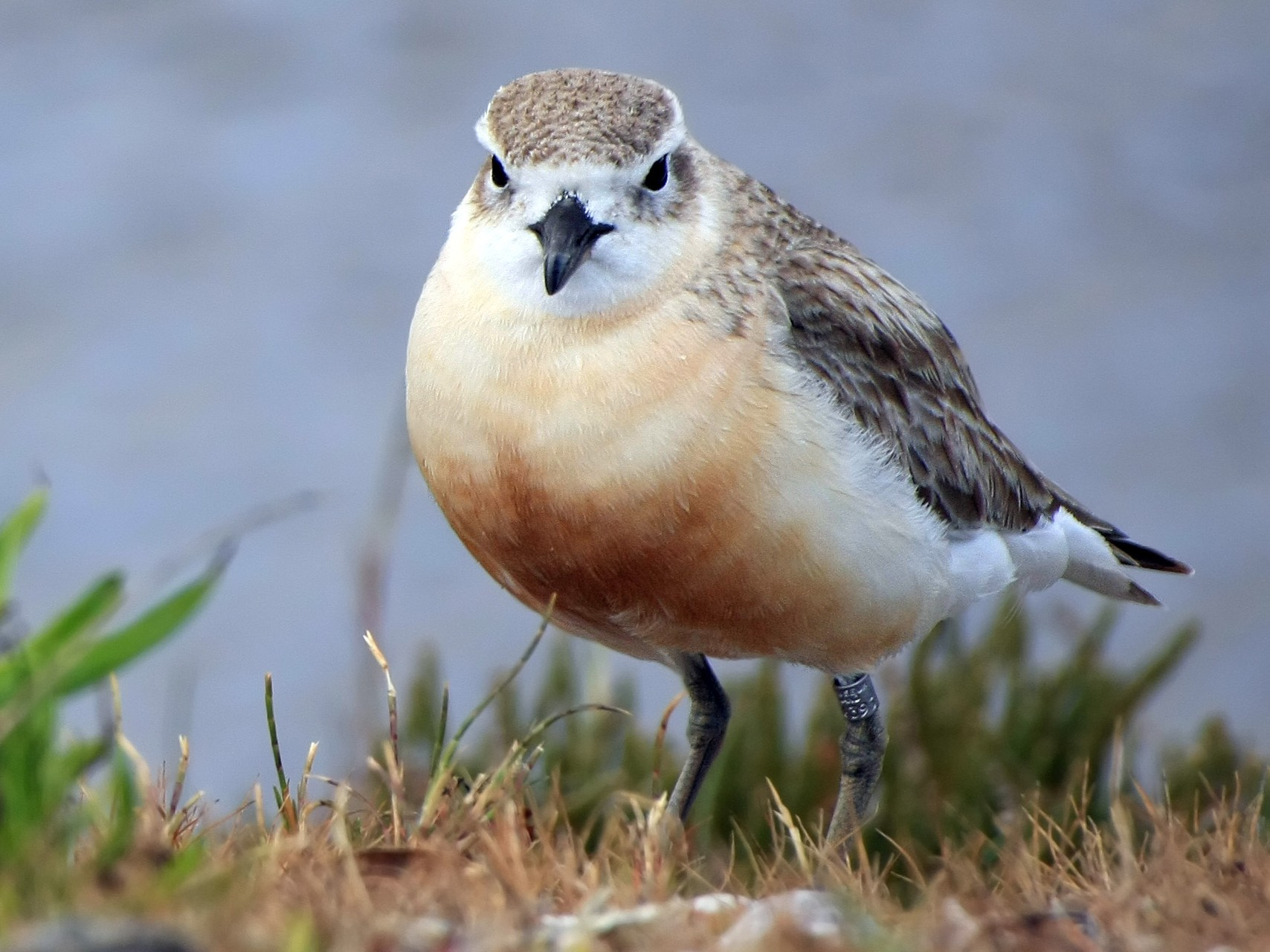
New Zealand dotterel

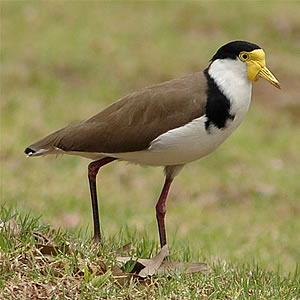
Masked lapwing

== Painted-snipes ==
Order: Charadriiformes Family: Rostratulidae

Painted-snipes are short-legged, long-billed birds similar in shape to the true snipes, but more brightly coloured.

Species	Kermadecs	North I	South I	Stewart	Chathams	Snares	Auckland	Campbell	Antipodes	Bounty
Greater painted-snipe Rostratula benghalensis			V							
Australian painted-snipe Rostratula australis			V							

== Sandpipers and allies ==
Order: Charadriiformes Family: Scolopacidae

The Scolopacidae is a large diverse family of small to medium-sized shorebirds including the sandpipers, curlews, godwits, shanks, tattlers, woodcocks, snipes, dowitchers and phalaropes. The majority of these species eat small invertebrates picked out of the mud or soil. Different lengths of legs and bills enable multiple species to feed in the same habitat, particularly on the coast, without direct competition for food.

Species	Kermadecs	North I	South I	Stewart	Chathams	Snares	Auckland	Campbell	Antipodes	Bounty
Upland sandpiper Bartramia longicauda		V								
Bristle-thighed curlew Numenius tahitiensis	V									
Eurasian whimbrel Numenius phaeopus	V	P	P		V					
Little curlew Numenius minutus		P	P							
Far Eastern curlew Numenius madagascarensis	V	P	P	V	V			V		
Bar-tailed godwit Limosa lapponica		P	P							
Black-tailed godwit Limosa limosa		P	P		P		V			
Hudsonian godwit Limosa haemastica		P	P		P			V		
Ruddy turnstone Arenaria interpres	V	P	P	P	P	V	P	V	V	
Great knot Calidris tenuirostris		P	P							
Red knot (Māori: huahou) Calidris canutus	V	P	P		P		V	V		
Ruff Calidris pugnax		V								
Broad-billed sandpiper Calidris falcinellus		V	V							
Sharp-tailed sandpiper Calidris acuminata	V	P	P	P	P	V	V			
Stilt sandpiper Calidris himantopus			V							
Curlew sandpiper Calidris ferruginea		P	P		V		V			
Long-toed stint Calidris subminuta			V							
Red-necked stint Calidris ruficollis		P	P		V		V			
Sanderling Calidris alba		P	P		V					
Dunlin Calidris alpina		V								
Baird's sandpiper Calidris bairdii		V								
Little stint Calidris minuta			V							
Least sandpiper Calidris minutilla		V								
White-rumped sandpiper Calidris fuscicollis		V								
Buff-breasted sandpiper Calidris subruficollis		V								
Pectoral sandpiper Calidris melanotos		P	P		V					
Western sandpiper Calidris mauri		V	V							
Asian dowitcher Limnodromus semipalmatus		V	V							
North Island snipe Coenocorypha barrierensis		X								
South Island snipe Coenocorypha iredalei			X	X						
Chatham snipe Coenocorypha pusilla					B					
Forbes's snipe Coenocorypha chathamica					X					
Snares snipe Coenocorypha huegeli						B				
Subantarctic snipe Coenocorypha aucklandica							B	B	B	
Latham's snipe Gallinago hardwickii		V	V	V		V				
Terek sandpiper Xenus cinereus		V	V							
Wilson's phalarope Phalaropus tricolor		V	V							
Red-necked phalarope Phalaropus lobatus		V	V							
Red phalarope Phalaropus fulicarius		V	V							
Common sandpiper Actitis hypoleucos		V	V	V						
Grey-tailed tattler Tringa brevipes	V	P	P		V	V	V			
Wandering tattler Tringa incana	V	P	P		V		V			
Common greenshank Tringa nebularia		P	P		V	V		V		
Lesser yellowlegs Tringa flavipes		V	V		V					
Marsh sandpiper Tringa stagnatilis		P	P		P					

== Pratincoles and coursers ==
Order: Charadriiformes Family: Glareolidae

Pratincoles have short legs, very long pointed wings and long forked tails. Their most unusual feature for birds classed as waders is that they typically hunt their insect prey on the wing like swallows, although they can also feed on the ground. Their short bills are an adaptation to aerial feeding.

Species	Kermadecs	North I	South I	Stewart	Chathams	Snares	Auckland	Campbell	Antipodes	Bounty
Oriental pratincole Glareola maldivarum	V	V	V	V						

== Skuas ==
Order: Charadriiformes Family: Stercorariidae

They are in general medium to large birds, typically with grey or brown plumage, often with white markings on the wings. They have longish bills with hooked tips and webbed feet with sharp claws. They look like large dark gulls, but have a fleshy cere above the upper mandible. They are strong, acrobatic fliers.

Species	Kermadecs	North I	South I	Stewart	Chathams	Snares	Auckland	Campbell	Antipodes	Bounty
South polar skua Stercorarius maccormicki	V	V	V	V	V	V	V	V	V	V
Brown skua Stercorarius antarcticus	P	P	B	B	B	B	B	B	B	P
Pomarine jaeger Stercorarius pomarinus		P	P		P					
Parasitic jaeger Stercorarius parasiticus	V	P	P		P				V	
Long-tailed jaeger Stercorarius longicaudus		P	P		P					

== Gulls, terns, noddies, and skimmers ==
Order: Charadriiformes Family: Laridae

Laridae is a family of medium to large seabirds and includes gulls, terns, kittiwakes and skimmers. They are typically grey or white, often with black markings on the head or wings. They have stout, longish bills and webbed feet.

Species	Kermadecs	North I	South I	Stewart	Chathams	Snares	Auckland	Campbell	Antipodes	Bounty
Red-billed gull (Subspecies of the silver gull) (Māori: tarāpunga) Chroicocephalus novaehollandiae scopulinus		B	B	B	B	B	B	B		
Black-billed gull (Māori: tarāpuka) Chroicocephalus bulleri		B	B							
Black-backed gull or kelp gull (Māori: karoro) Larus dominicanus	V	B	B	B	B	B	B	B	B	B
Pacific gull Larus pacificus		V								
Franklin's gull Leucophaeus pipixcan	V	V	V							
Laughing gull Leucophaeus atricilla		V								
White-fronted tern Sterna striata		B	B	B	B	B	B			
Antarctic tern Sterna vittata		V	P	B	V	B	B	B	B	B
Arctic tern Sterna paradisaea		V	V	V	V	V	V	V	V	
Common tern Sterna hirundo		P	P							
Black-naped tern Sterna sumatrana		V								
Greater crested tern Thalasseus bergii	V	V	V							
Black-fronted tern (Māori: tarapiroe) Chlidonias albostriatus		P	B							
White-winged tern Chlidonias leucopterus		P	P							
Whiskered tern Chlidonias hybrida		V	V							
Black tern Chlidonias niger		V								
Caspian tern (Māori: taranui) Hydroprogne caspia	V	P	P		V					
Gull-billed tern Gelochelidon nilotica		P	P							
Little tern Sternula albifrons	V	P	P		V					
Fairy tern Sternula nereis		B	ex							
Sooty tern Onychoprion fuscatus	B	V								
Spectacled tern Onychoprion lunatus		V								
Bridled tern Onychoprion anaethetus			V							
White tern Gygis alba	B	V	V							
Grey noddy Anous albivitta	B	P	P							
Black noddy Anous minutus	B	V								
Brown noddy Anous stolidus	B	V								
Blue noddy Anous ceruleus	P	V	V							

== Tropicbirds ==
Order: Phaethontiformes Family: Phaethontidae

Tropicbirds are slender white birds of tropical oceans, with exceptionally long central tail feathers. Their long wings have black markings, as does the head.

Species	Kermadecs	North I	South I	Stewart	Chathams	Snares	Auckland	Campbell	Antipodes	Bounty
White-tailed tropicbird Phaethon lepturus		V								
Red-tailed tropicbird (Māori: amokura) Phaethon rubricauda	B	P								

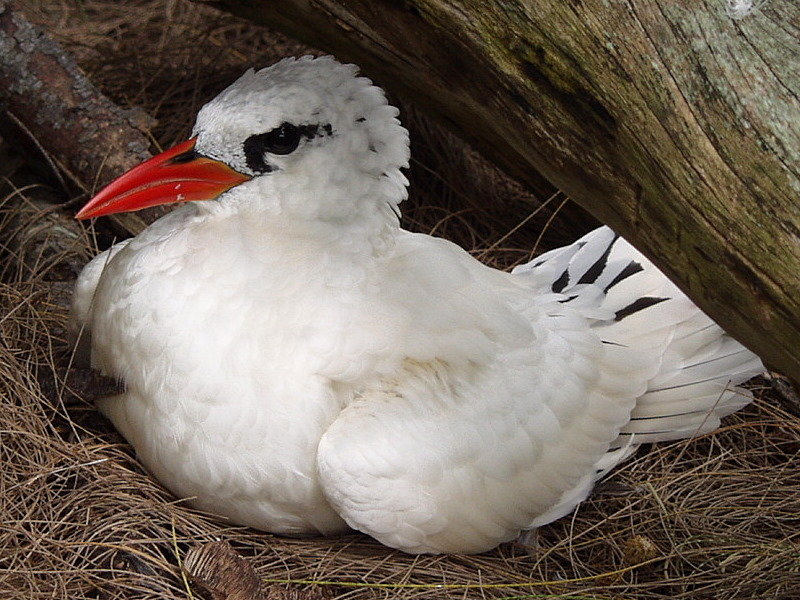
Red-tailed tropicbird

== Penguins ==
Order: Sphenisciformes Family: Spheniscidae

The penguins are a group of aquatic, flightless birds living almost exclusively in the Southern Hemisphere. Most penguins feed on krill, fish, squid, and other forms of sealife caught while swimming underwater.

Species	Kermadecs	North I	South I	Stewart	Chathams	Snares	Auckland	Campbell	Antipodes	Bounty
King penguin Aptenodytes patagonicus			V	V	V	V	V	V	V	
Emperor penguin Aptenodytes forsteri		V	V							
Adélie penguin Pygoscelis adeliae			V							
Chinstrap penguin Pygoscelis antarcticus			V					V	V	
Gentoo penguin Pygoscelis papua			V			V		V	V	
Little penguin (Māori: kororā) Eudyptula minor		B	B	B	B	V				
Yellow-eyed penguin (Māori: hoiho) Megadyptes antipodes		ex (Note: The subspecies M. a. waitaha from the North Island, South Island, and Stewart Island is extinct. The subspecies M. a. antipodes from the subantarctic islands has colonised Stewart Island and part of the South Island, but not the North Island. See the article yellow-eyed penguin for details.)	B	B	ex (Note: The endemic dwarf subspecies M. a. richdalei is extinct. In other words, the breeding population of yellow-eyed penguins from the Chatham Islands is extirpated. The modern population M. a. antipodes is vagrant. See the article yellow-eyed penguin for details.)	V	B	B		
Magellanic penguin Spheniscus magellanicus		V	V							
Fiordland penguin (Māori: tawaki, pokotiwha) Eudyptes pachyrhynchus		V	B	B		V	V	V		
Snares penguin Eudyptes robustus		V	V	V	V	B	V	V	V	
Erect-crested penguin Eudyptes sclateri		V	V	V	V	V	V	V	B	B
Western rockhopper penguin Eudyptes chrysocome						V				
Northern rockhopper penguin Eudyptes moseleyi		V			V					
Royal penguin Eudyptes schlegeli		V	V		V	V		V	V	
Macaroni penguin Eudyptes chrysolophus						V		V		
Chatham penguin Eudyptes warhami					X					

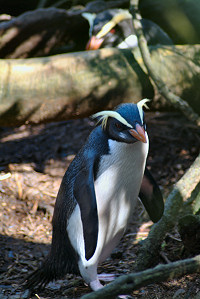
Fiordland penguin

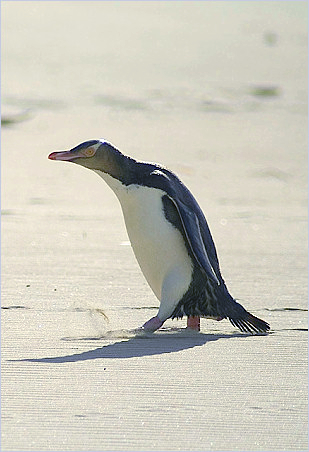
Yellow-eyed penguin

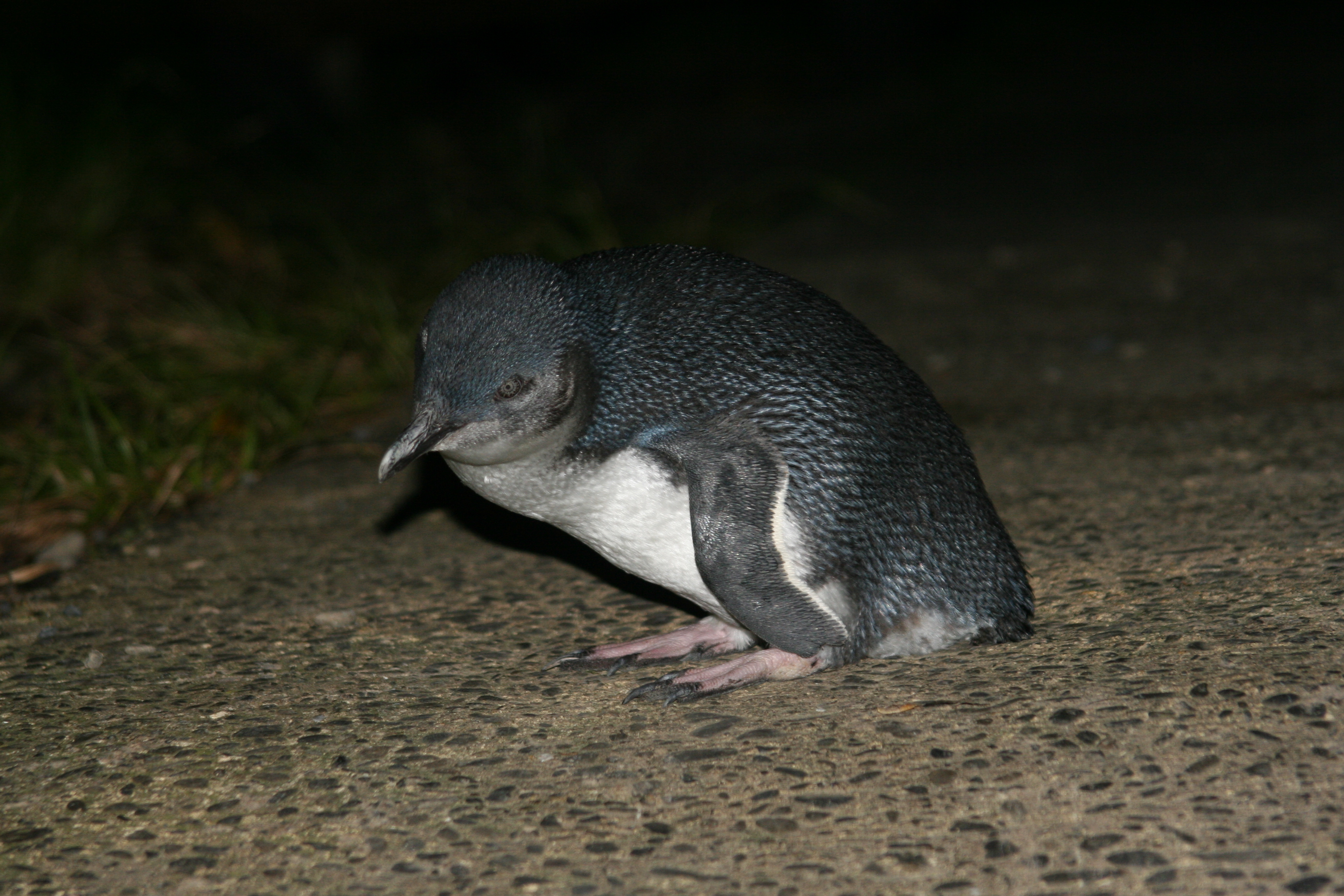
Little penguin

== Albatrosses ==
Order: Procellariiformes Family: Diomedeidae

The albatrosses are a family of large seabird found across the Southern and North Pacific Oceans. The largest are among the largest flying birds in the world.

Species	Kermadecs	North I	South I	Stewart	Chathams	Snares	Auckland	Campbell	Antipodes	Bounty
Indian yellow-nosed albatross Thalassarche carteri	P	P	P		P					
Grey-headed albatross Thalassarche chrysostoma	P	P	P	P	P	P	P	B	P	P
Buller's albatross Thalassarche bulleri	P	P	B	P	B	B	P	P	P	P
Shy albatross Thalassarche cauta	P	P	P	P	B	P	B	P	B	P
Salvin's albatross Thalassarche salvini	P	P	P	P	P	B	P	P	P	B
Chatham albatross Thalassarche eremita	P	P	P	P	B	P	P	P	P	
Black-browed albatross Thalassarche melanophris	P	P	P	P	P	B	P	B	B	P
Sooty albatross Phoebetria fusca					V		V	V	V	
Light-mantled albatross Phoebetria palpebrata		P	P	P	P	P	B	B	B	P
Southern royal albatross Diomedea epomophora			B				B	B		
Northern royal albatross Diomedea sanfordi			B		B		B			
Wandering albatross Diomedea exulans	P									
Laysan albatross Phoebastria immutabilis		V								
Black-footed albatross Phoebastria nigripes			V							

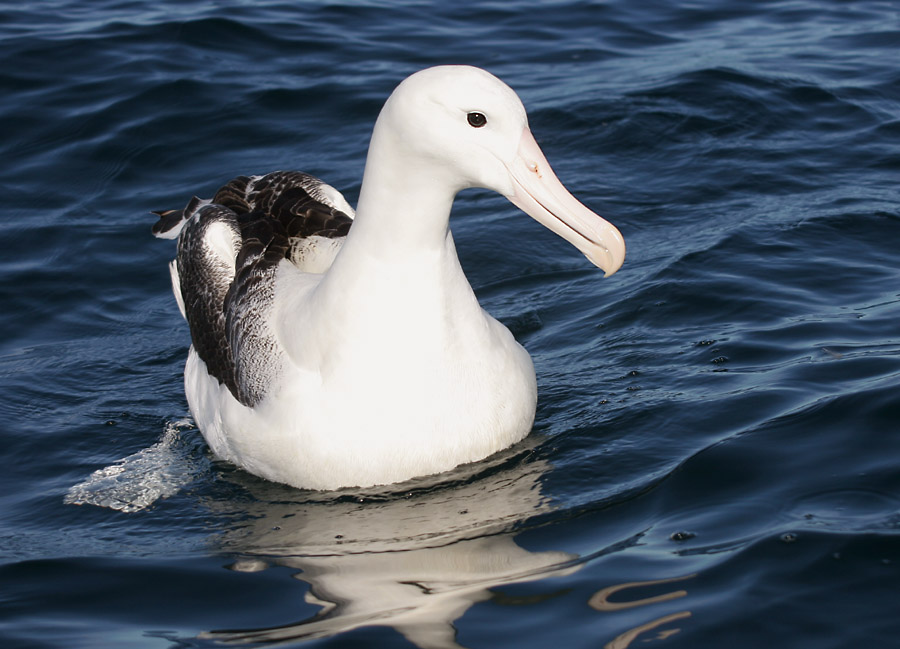
Royal albatross

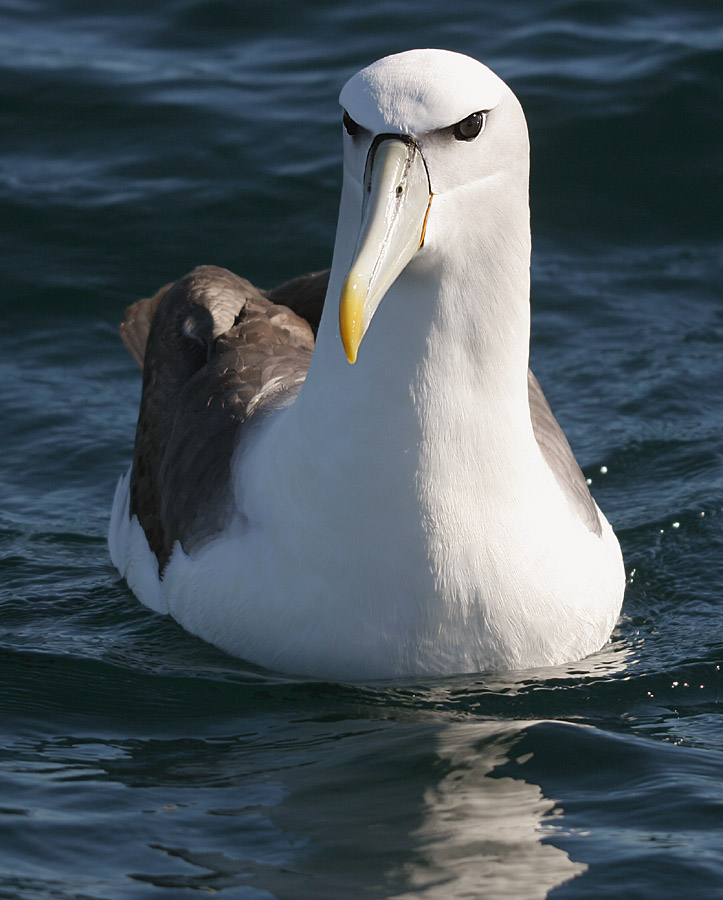
White-capped albatross

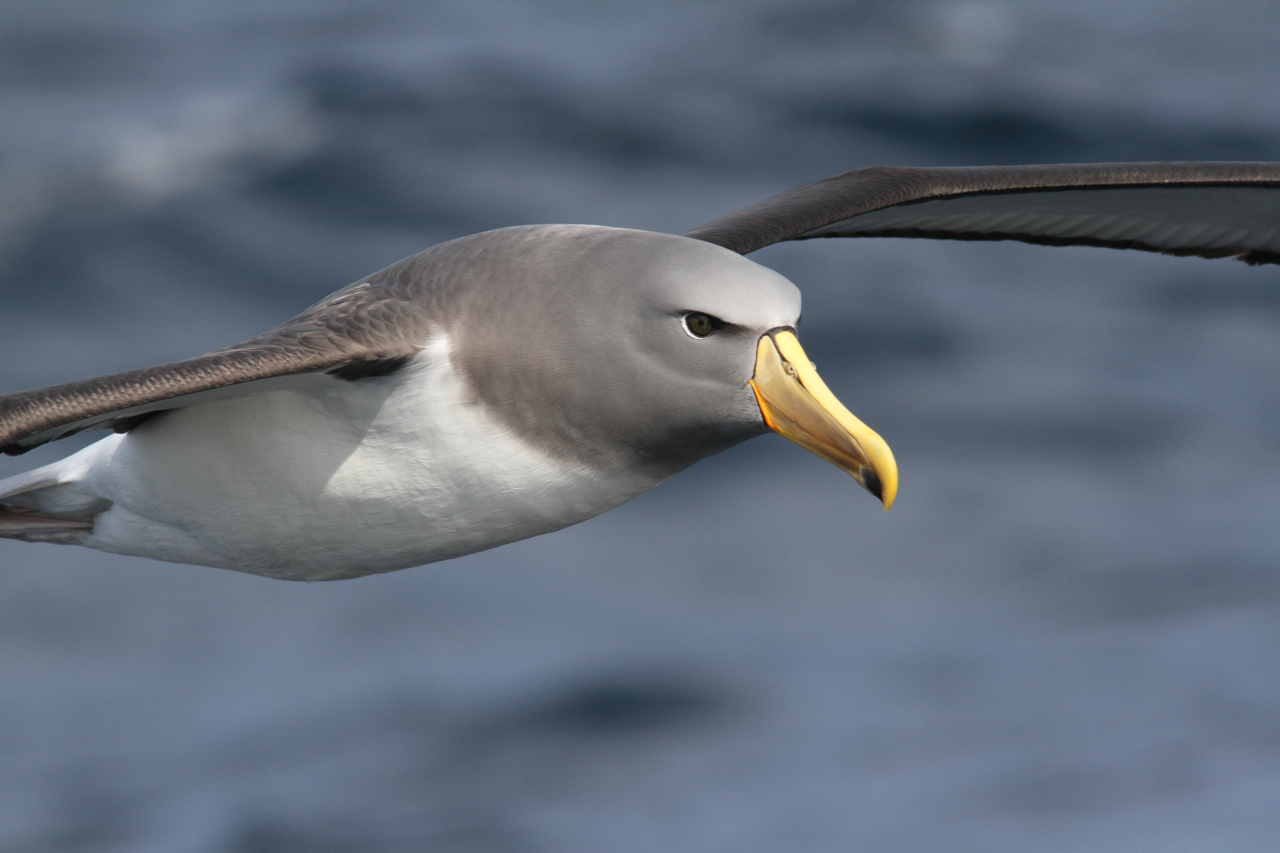
Chatham albatross

== Austral storm petrels ==
Order: Procellariiformes Family: Oceanitidae

The southern storm-petrels are the smallest seabirds, relatives of the petrels, feeding on planktonic crustaceans and small fish picked from the surface, typically while hovering. Their flight is fluttering and sometimes bat-like.

Species	Kermadecs	North I	South I	Stewart	Chathams	Snares	Auckland	Campbell	Antipodes	Bounty
Wilson's storm petrel Oceanites oceanicus	P									
Grey-backed storm petrel Garrodia nereis		P	P	P	B	P	B	P	B	P
White-faced storm petrel Pelagodroma marina	B	B	B	B	B	P	B	P	P	P
White-bellied storm petrel Fregetta grallaria	B	V								
New Zealand storm petrel Fregetta maoriana		B								
Black-bellied storm petrel Fregetta tropica	P	P	P	P	P	P	B	P	B	B

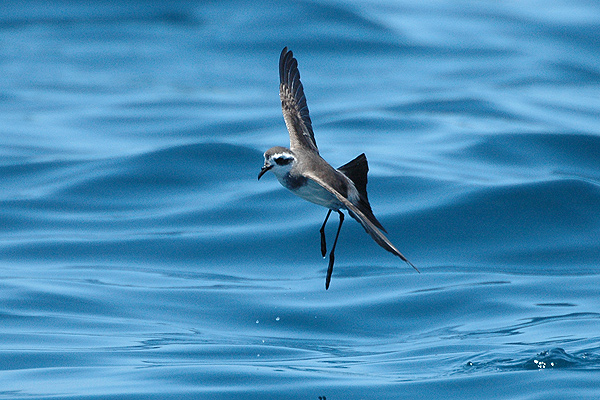
White-faced storm-petrel

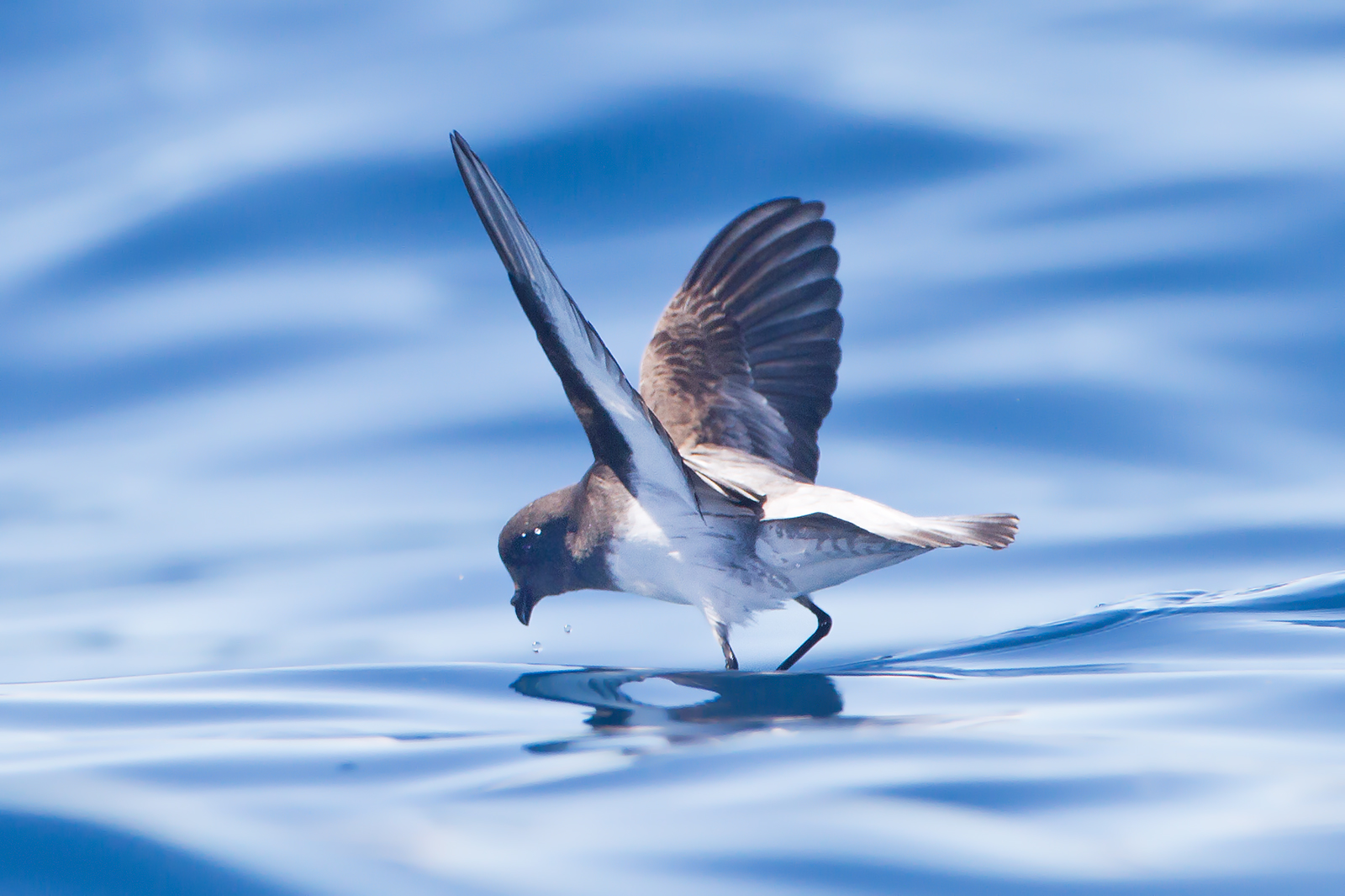
Grey-backed storm-petrel

== Northern storm petrels ==
Order: Procellariiformes Family: Hydrobatidae

Northern storm-petrels are small birds which spend most of their lives at sea, coming ashore only to breed. They feed on planktonic crustaceans and small fish picked from the surface, typically while hovering or pattering across the water. Their flight is fluttering and sometimes bat-like.

Species	Kermadecs	North I	South I	Stewart	Chathams	Snares	Auckland	Campbell	Antipodes	Bounty
Leach's storm petrel Hydrobates leucorhous		V			V					
Swinhoe's storm petrel Hydrobates monorhis		V								

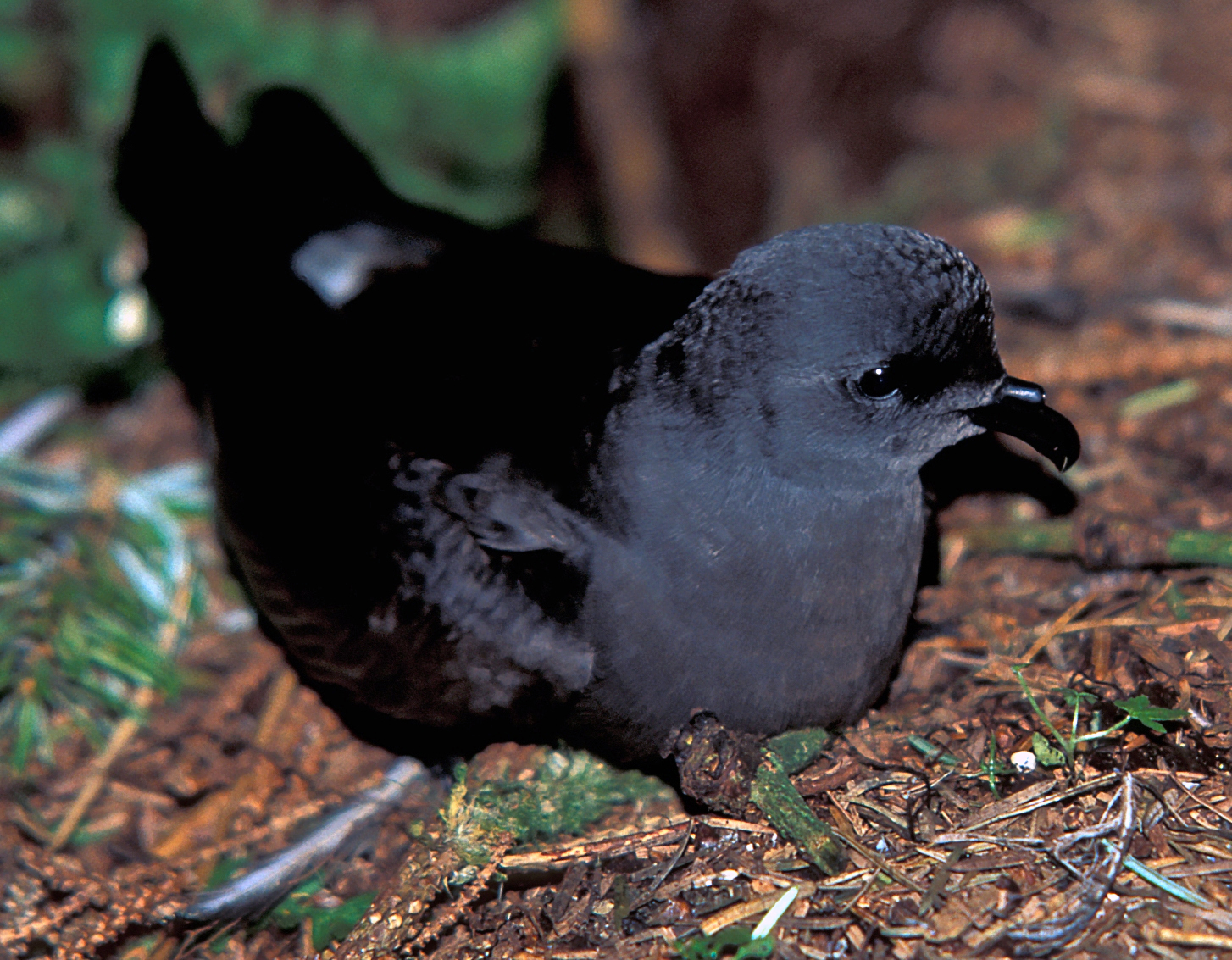
Leach's storm-petrel

== Petrels and shearwaters ==
Order: Procellariiformes Family: Procellariidae

The procellariids are the main group of medium-sized "true petrels", characterised by united nostrils with medium nasal septum, and a long outer functional primary flight feather.

Species	Kermadecs	North I	South I	Stewart	Chathams	Snares	Auckland	Campbell	Antipodes	Bounty
Southern giant petrel Macronectes giganteus	P									
Northern giant petrel Macronectes halli		P	P	P	B	P	B	B	B	
Northern fulmar Fulmarus glacialis						V				
Southern fulmar Fulmarus glacialoides	P									
Antarctic petrel Thalassoica antarctica	V									
Cape petrel Daption capense		P	P	P	B	B	B	B	B	B
Snow petrel Pagodroma nivea			V							
Kerguelen petrel Aphrodroma brevirostris		P	P	P	P	P	P	P	P	P
Great-winged petrel Pterodroma macroptera		P	P							
Grey-faced petrel Pterodroma gouldi	P	B	P	P	P	P	P	P	P	P
Kermadec petrel Pterodroma neglecta	B	V			V					
Magenta petrel Pterodroma magentae					B					
Herald petrel Pterodroma heraldica	V									
Providence petrel Pterodroma solandri	V	V					V			
Soft-plumaged petrel Pterodroma mollis		P	P	P	B	P	P	P	B	P
White-headed petrel Pterodroma lessonii		P	P	P	P	P	B	B?	B	P
Mottled petrel Pterodroma inexpectata	P	P	B	B	P	B	P	P	P	P
Juan Fernández petrel Pterodroma externa	V	V	V		V					
White-necked petrel Pterodroma cervicalis	B	P	P	P						
Black-winged petrel Pterodroma nigripennis	B	B	P		B		P	P	P	P
Chatham petrel Pterodroma axillaris					B					
Cook's petrel Pterodroma cookii	P	B	P	B	P	P	P	P	P	P
Gould's petrel Pterodroma leucoptera		P	V							
Collared petrel Pterodroma brevipes		V								
Stejneger's petrel Pterodroma longirostris	V	V								
Pycroft's petrel Pterodroma pycrofti	V	B			V					
Phoenix petrel Pterodroma alba	V									
Imber's petrel Pterodroma imberi					X					
Species	Kermadecs	North I	South I	Stewart	Chathams	Snares	Auckland	Campbell	Antipodes	Bounty
Blue petrel Halobaena caerulea	P									
Fairy prion Pachyptila turtur	P	B	B	B	B	B	B	B	B	P
Broad-billed prion Pachyptila vittata	P	P	B	B	B	B	P	P	P	P
Salvin's prion Pachyptila salvini	P									
Antarctic prion Pachyptila desolata	P	P	P	P	P	P	B	B	P	P
Slender-billed prion Pachyptila belcheri	P									
Fulmar prion Pachyptila crassirostris	P	P	P	P	B	B	B	P	P	B
Bulwer's petrel Bulweria bulwerii		V								
Tahiti petrel Pseudobulweria rostrata		V								
Grey petrel Procellaria cinerea	P	P	P	P	P	P	P	B	B	P
White-chinned petrel Procellaria aequinoctialis	P	P	P	P	P	P	B	B	B	P
Black petrel Procellaria parkinsoni	P	B	P		P					
Westland petrel Procellaria westlandica	P	P	B	P	P	P	P	P	P	P
Streaked shearwater Calonectris leucomelas		V								
Cory's shearwater Calonectris borealis		V								
Pink-footed shearwater Ardenna creatopus		V								
Flesh-footed shearwater Ardenna carneipes	P	B	P		P					
Great shearwater Ardenna gravis		V	V		V					
Wedge-tailed shearwater Ardenna pacifica	B	P								
Buller's shearwater Ardenna bulleri	P	B	P	P	P	P				
Sooty shearwater (Māori: tītī) Ardenna grisea	P	B	B	B	B	B	B	B	B	P
Short-tailed shearwater Ardenna tenuirostris	P									
Christmas shearwater Puffinus nativitatis	V	V								
Manx shearwater Puffinus puffinus		V								
Hutton's shearwater Puffinus huttoni		P	B	P		P				
Newell's shearwater Puffinus newelli		V								
Fluttering shearwater Puffinus gavia	P	B	P	P	P	P				
Scarlett's shearwater Puffinus spelaeus			X							
Little shearwater Puffinus assimilis	B	B	P							
Subantarctic shearwater Puffinus elegans		P	P	P	B	P	P	B	P	P
Common diving petrel Pelecanoides urinatrix		B	B	B	B	B	B	B	B	
South Georgia diving petrel Pelecanoides georgicus			B	ex			ex			

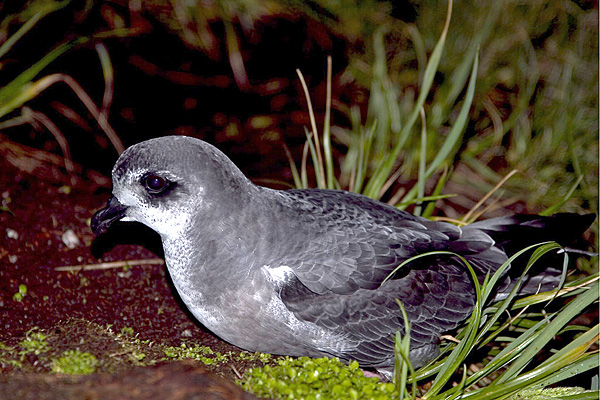
Mottled petrel

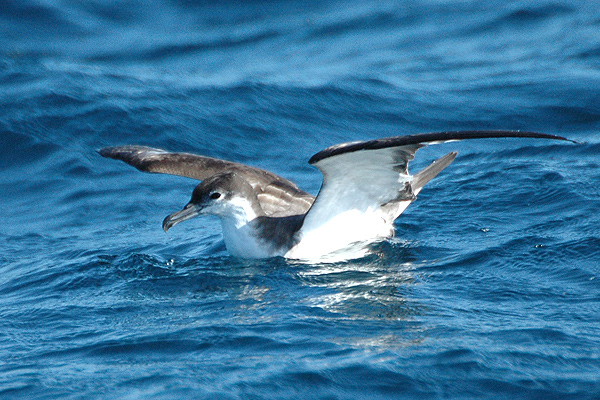
Buller's shearwater

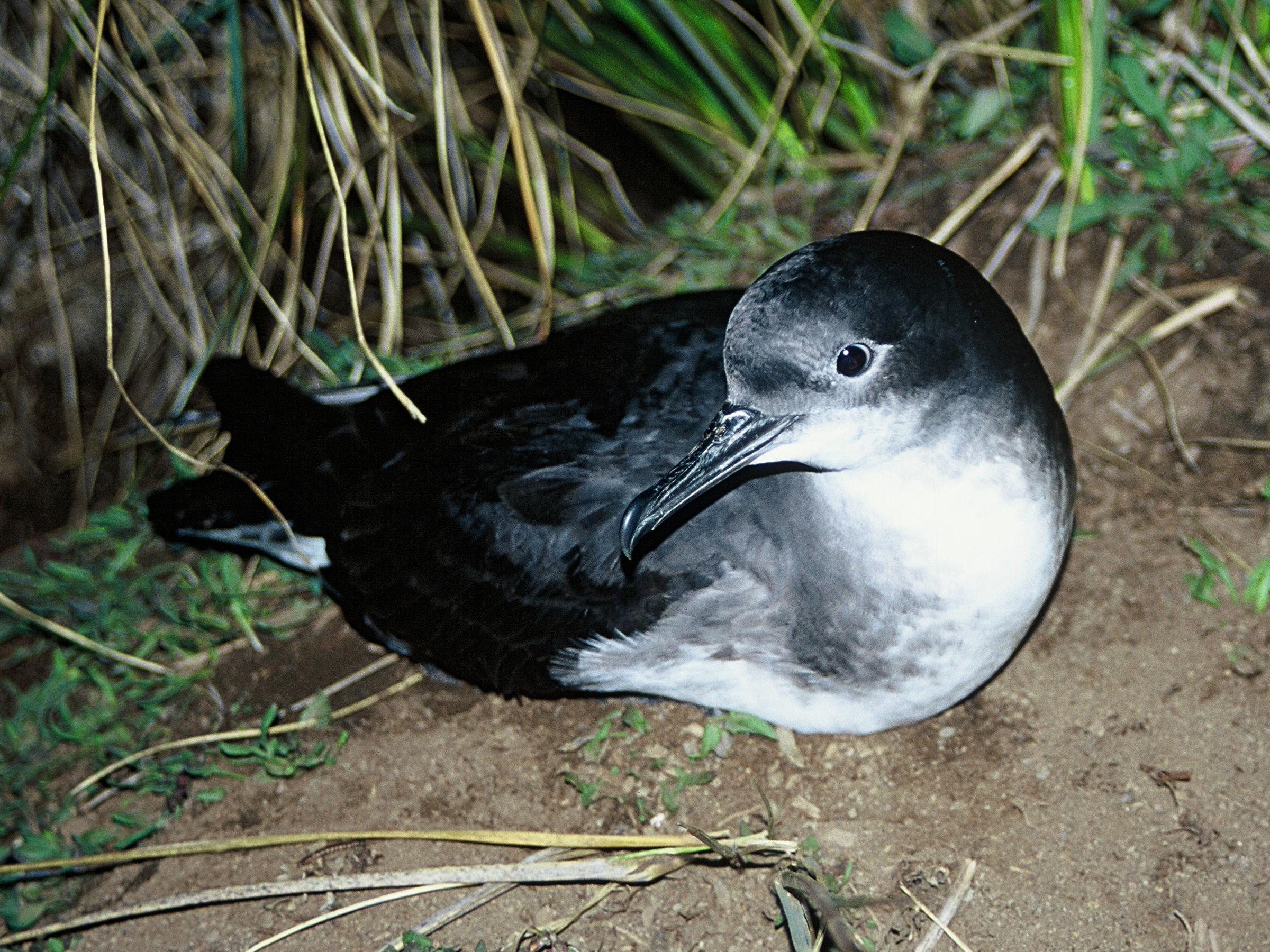
Hutton's shearwater

== Frigatebirds ==
Order: Suliformes Family: Fregatidae

Frigatebirds are large seabirds usually found over tropical oceans. They are large, black-and-white, or completely black, with long wings and deeply forked tails. The males have coloured inflatable throat pouches. They do not swim or walk and cannot take off from a flat surface. Having the largest wingspan-to-body-weight ratio of any bird, they are essentially aerial, able to stay aloft for more than a week.

Species	Kermadecs	North I	South I	Stewart	Chathams	Snares	Auckland	Campbell	Antipodes	Bounty
Lesser frigatebird Fregata ariel		V	V		V					
Great frigatebird Fregata minor		V	V							

== Boobies and gannets ==
Order: Suliformes Family: Sulidae

The sulids comprise the gannets and boobies. Both groups are medium-large coastal seabirds that plunge-dive for fish.

Species	Kermadecs	North I	South I	Stewart	Chathams	Snares	Auckland	Campbell	Antipodes	Bounty
Masked booby Sula dactylatra	B	V								
Brown booby Sula leucogaster	P	P	P	V						
Red-footed booby Sula sula	V									
Cape gannet Morus capensis		V								
Australasian gannet or tākapu Morus serrator		B	B	P	P	P	P	P		

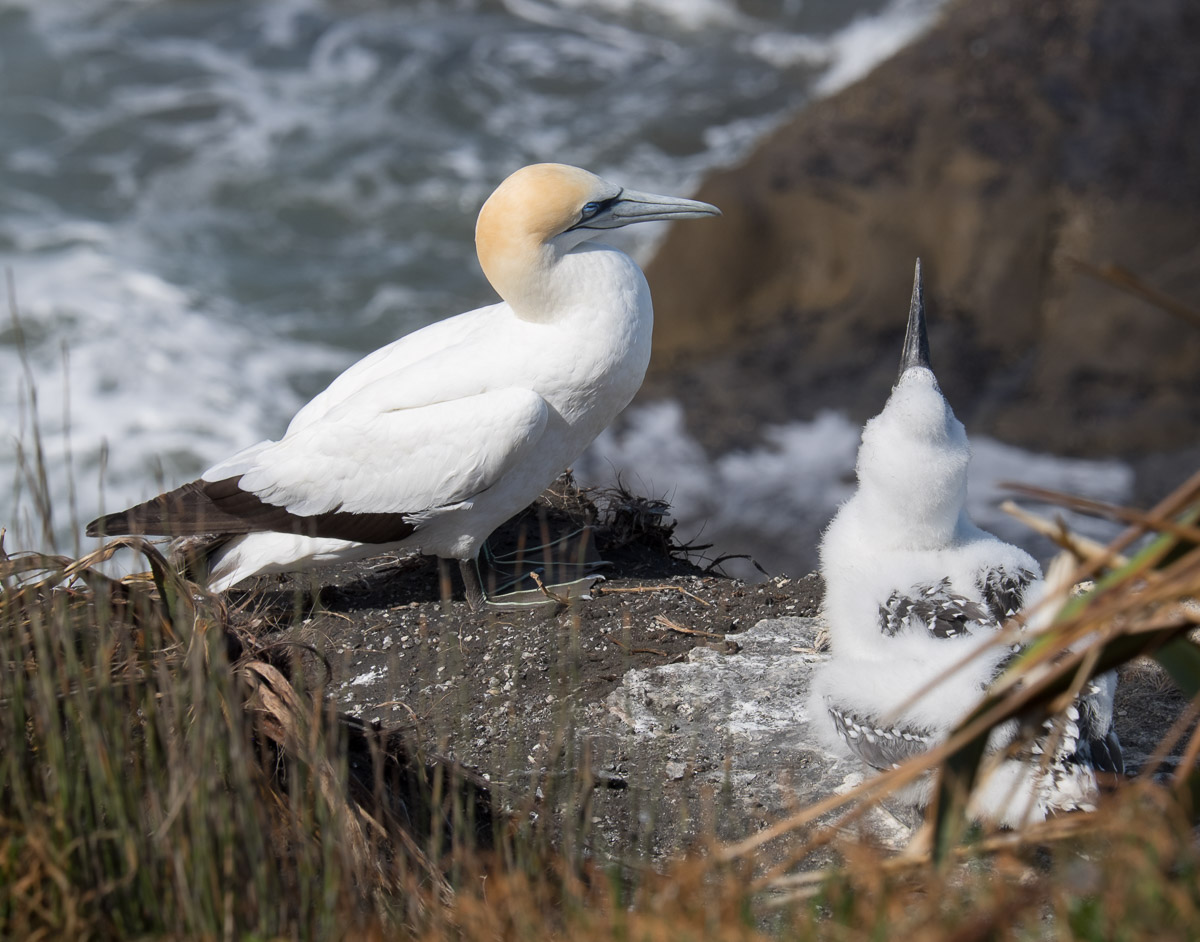
Australasian gannet

== Darters ==
Order: Suliformes Family: Anhingidae

Anhingas or darters are frequently referred to as "snake-birds" because of their long thin neck, which gives a snake-like appearance when they swim with their bodies submerged. The males have black and dark brown plumage, an erectile crest on the nape and a larger bill than the female. The females have a much paler plumage especially on the neck and underparts. The darters have completely webbed feet, and their legs are short and set far back on the body. Their plumage is somewhat permeable, like that of cormorants, and they spread their wings to dry after diving.

Species	Kermadecs	North I	South I	Stewart	Chathams	Snares	Auckland	Campbell	Antipodes	Bounty
Australasian darter Anhinga novaehollandiae		V	V							

== Cormorants and shags ==
Order: Suliformes Family: Phalacrocoracidae

The Phalacrocoracidae is a family of medium-to-large coastal, fish-eating sea-birds that includes cormorants and shags. Plumage colouration varies with the majority having mainly dark plumage, some species being black and white, and a few being colourful. The bill is long, thin and sharply hooked.

Species	Kermadecs	North I	South I	Stewart	Chathams	Snares	Auckland	Campbell	Antipodes	Bounty
Little pied cormorant (Māori: kawaupaka) Microcarbo melanoleucos		B	B	B	V	V	V	V		
Great cormorant (Māori: kawau) Phalacrocorax carbo		B	B	B	V	V	V			
Spotted shag Phalacrocorax punctatus		B	B							
Pitt shag Phalacrocorax featherstoni					B					
Little black cormorant Phalacrocorax sulcirostris		B	B	V		V				
Australian pied cormorant (Māori: kāruhiruhi) Phalacrocorax varius		B	B							
Bounty shag Leucocarbo ranfurlyi									V	B
New Zealand king shag Leucocarbo carunculatus			B							
Stewart Island shag Leucocarbo chalconotus			B	B						
Chatham shag Leucocarbo onslowi					B					
Auckland shag Leucocarbo colensoi						V	B			
Campbell shag Leucocarbo campbelli								B		
Macquarie shag Leucocarbo purpurascens									V	

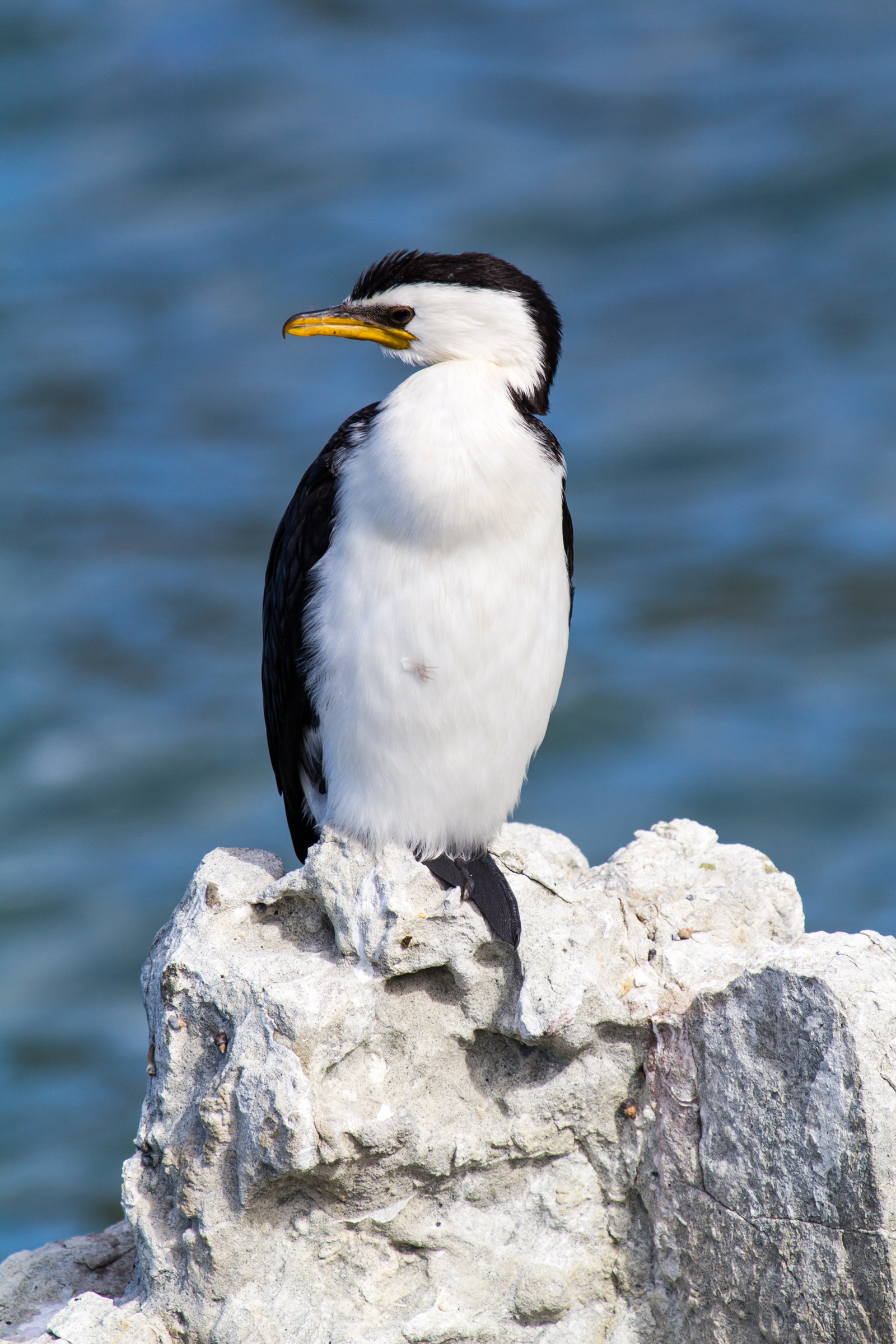
Little shag

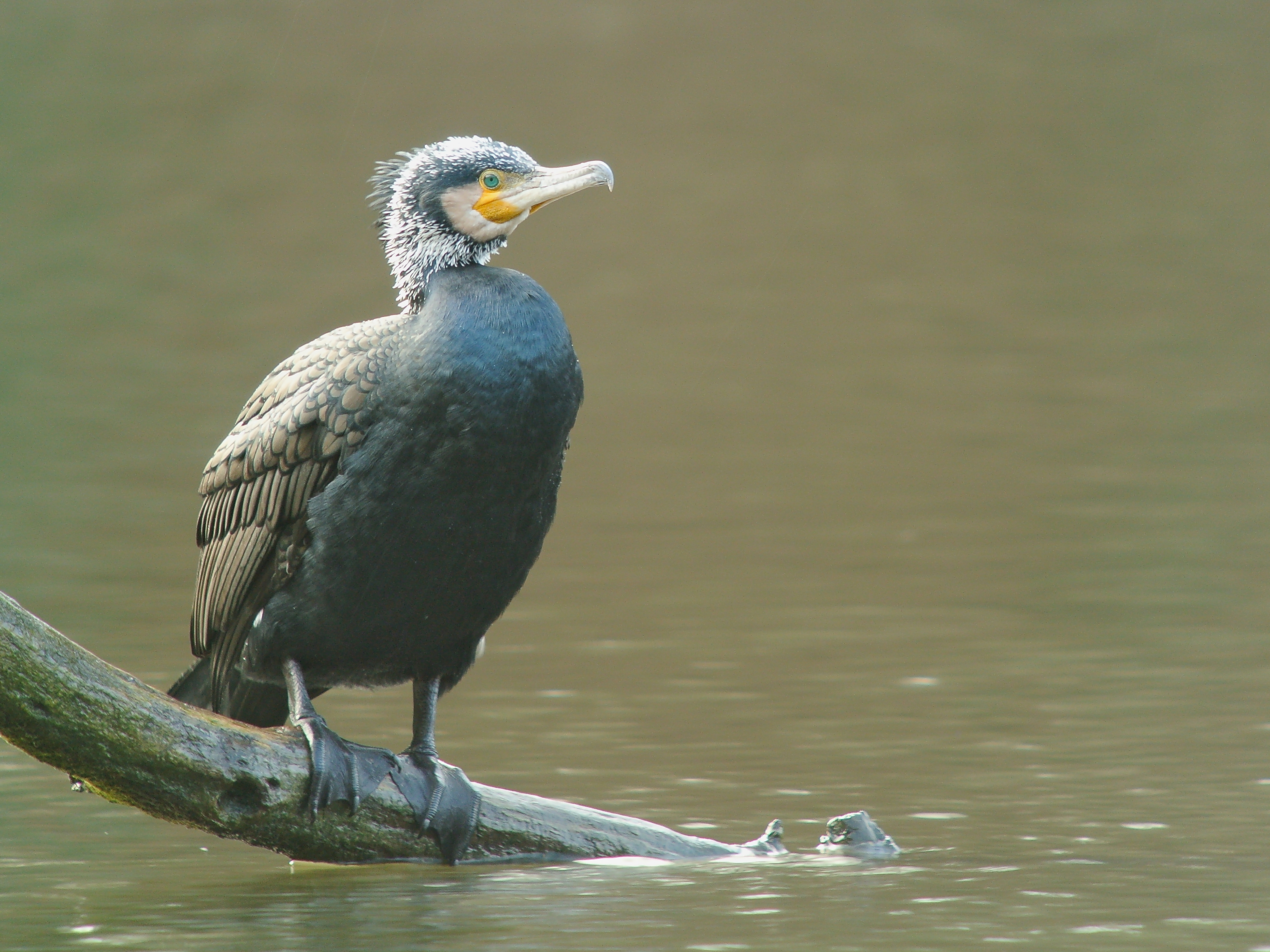
Black shag

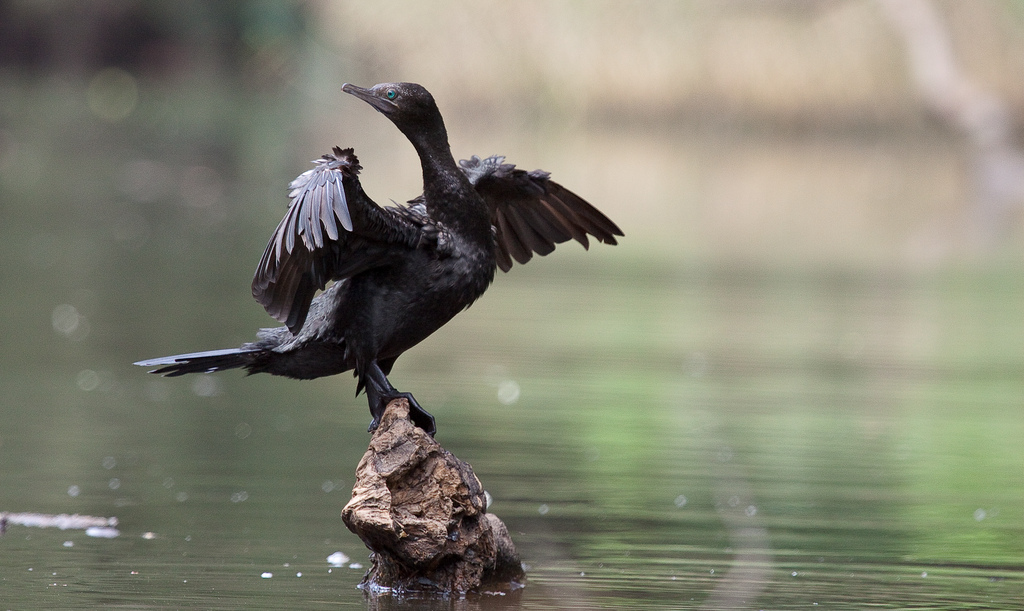
Little black shag

== Pelicans ==
Order: Pelecaniformes Family: Pelecanidae

Pelicans are large water birds with distinctive pouches under their bills. Like other birds in the order Pelecaniformes, they have four webbed toes.

Species	Kermadecs	North I	South I	Stewart	Chathams	Snares	Auckland	Campbell	Antipodes	Bounty
Australian pelican Pelecanus conspicillatus		V	V							

== Herons, egrets, and bitterns ==
Order: Pelecaniformes Family: Ardeidae

The family Ardeidae contains the bitterns, herons and egrets. Herons and egrets are medium to large sized wading birds with long necks and legs. Bitterns tend to be shorter necked and more wary. Unlike other long-necked birds such as storks, ibises and spoonbills, members of Ardeidae fly with their necks retracted.

Species	Kermadecs	North I	South I	Stewart	Chathams	Snares	Auckland	Campbell	Antipodes	Bounty
Australasian bittern Botaurus poiciloptilus		P	P	P	P					
Black-backed bittern Ixobrychus dubius			V							
New Zealand bittern Ixobrychus novaezelandiae		X	X		X					
Grey heron Ardea cinerea		V								
White-necked heron Ardea pacifica	V	V	V							
Great egret (Māori: kōtuku) Ardea alba	V	P	B	V	V	V				
Plumed egret Ardea intermedia plumifera		V	V							
White-faced heron Egretta novaehollandiae	V	B	B	V	B	V	V	V		
Little egret Egretta garzetta	V	V	V							
Pacific reef heron Egretta sacra	V	B	B	P	V		V			
Eastern cattle egret Ardea coromanda	V	P	P	P	V	V				
Nankeen night heron Nycticorax caledonicus		B	V	V		V				

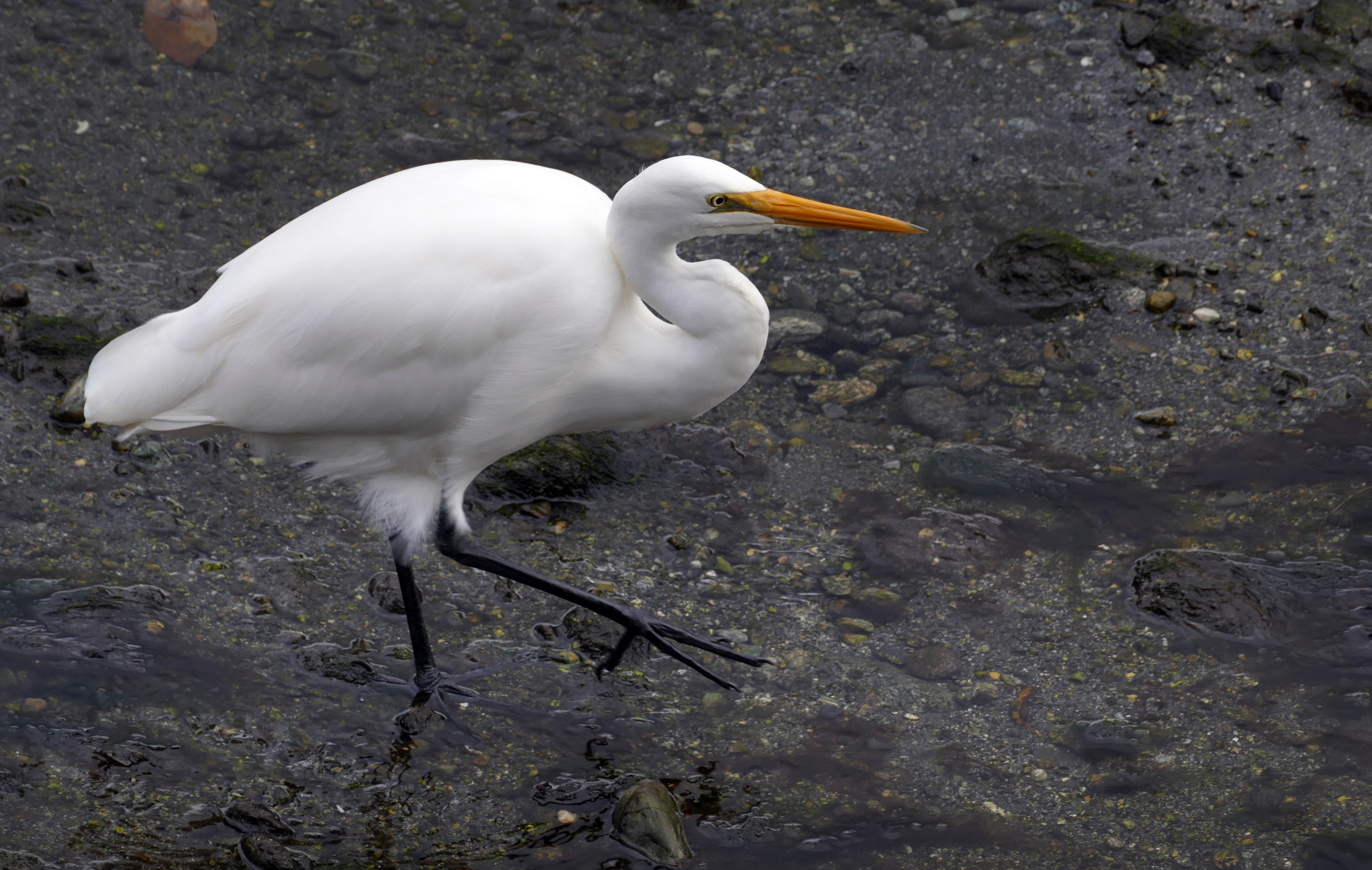
White heron

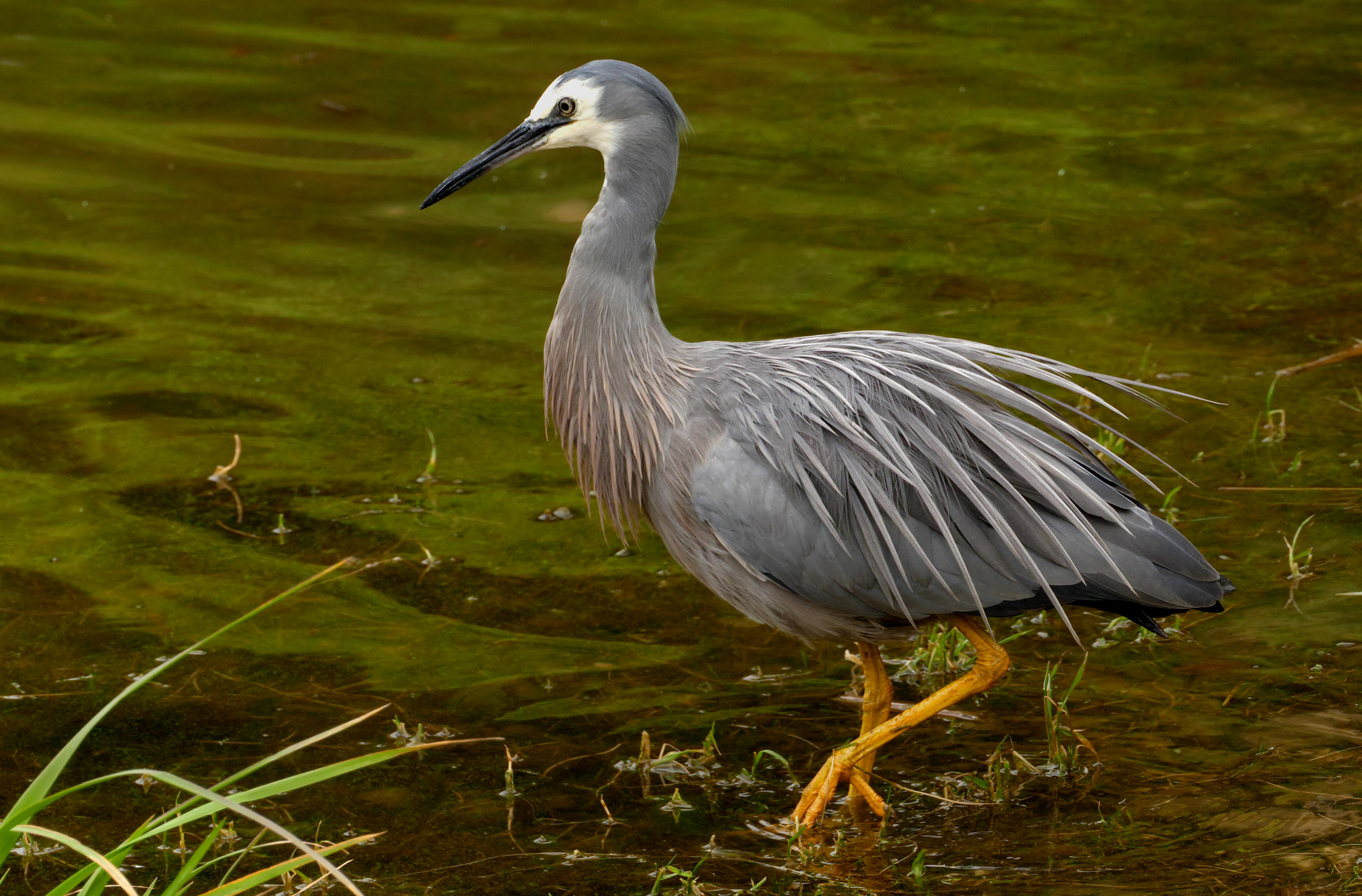
White-faced heron

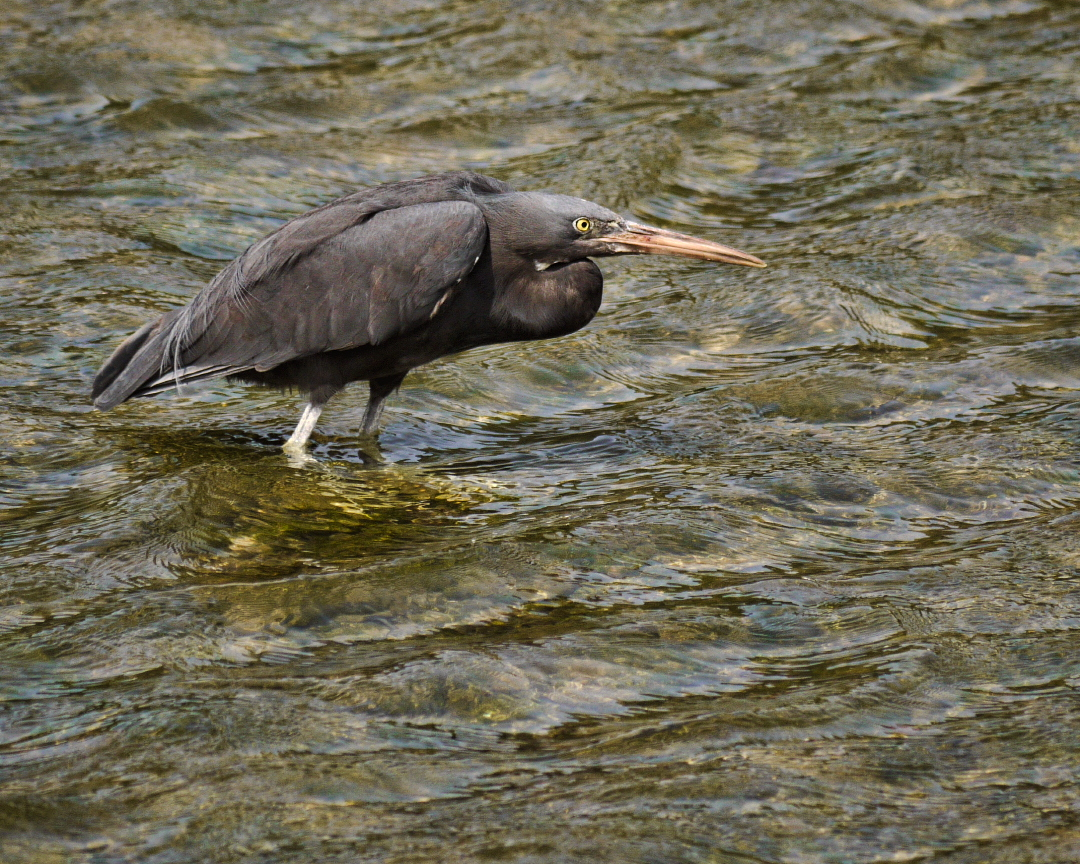
Reef heron

== Ibises and spoonbills ==
Order: Pelecaniformes Family: Threskiornithidae

The Threskiornithidae is a family of large terrestrial and wading birds which includes the ibises and spoonbills. They have long, broad wings with 11 primary and about 20 secondary feathers. They are strong fliers and despite their size and weight, very capable soarers.

Species	Kermadecs	North I	South I	Stewart	Chathams	Snares	Auckland	Campbell	Antipodes	Bounty
Glossy ibis Plegadis falcinellus		P	P		V					
Australian white ibis Threskiornis molucca		V	V							
Straw-necked ibis Threskiornis spinicollis			V							
Royal spoonbill Platalea regia	V	B	B		V					
Yellow-billed spoonbill Platalea flavipes		V								

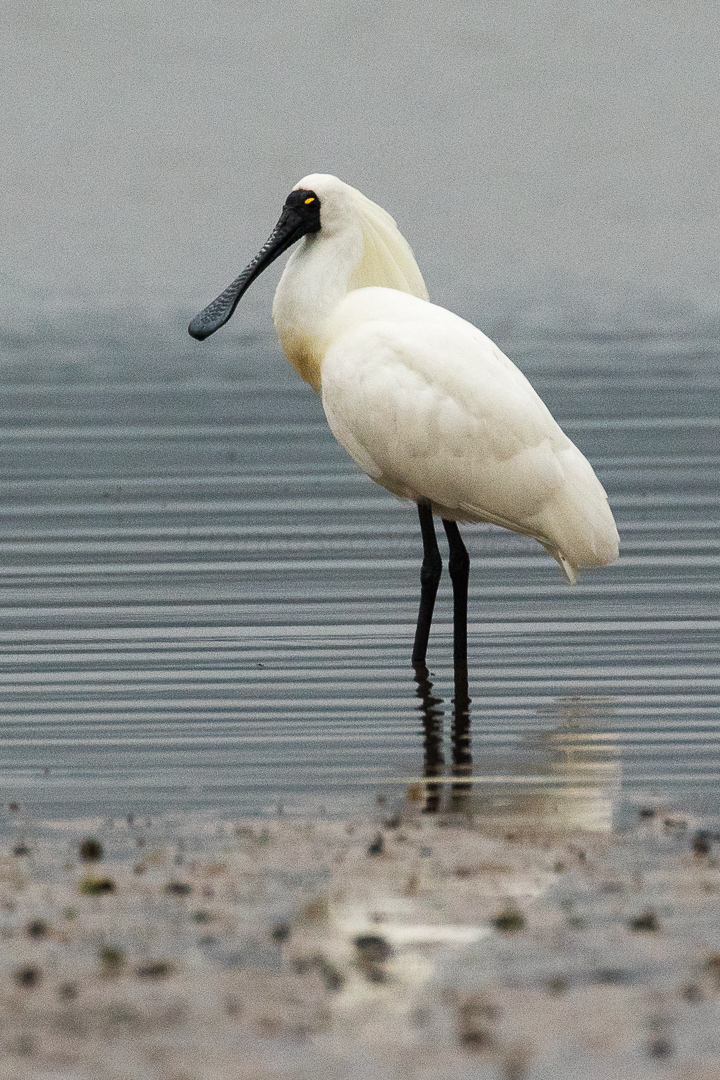
Royal spoonbill

== Hawks, eagles, and kites ==
Order: Accipitriformes Family: Accipitridae

Accipitridae is a family of birds of prey and includes the osprey, hawks, eagles, kites, harriers and Old World vultures. These birds have very large powerful hooked beaks for tearing flesh from their prey, strong legs, powerful talons and keen eyesight.

Species	Kermadecs	North I	South I	Stewart	Chathams	Snares	Auckland	Campbell	Antipodes	Bounty
Swamp harrier (Māori: kāhu) Circus approximans	P	I (Note: The swamp harrier was indirectly introduced by human activity. Eyles's harrier (Circus teauteensis), a larger harrier species endemic to New Zealand, became extinct after human settlement. The swamp harrier arrived in New Zealand within the last 700 years, replacing its sister species. There is no evidence for widespread coexistence of swamp and Eyles's harriers in New Zealand. Apparently, despite their considerable differences, the two harriers were still ecologically similar enough to competitively exclude one another, and only when the endemic Eyles's harrier became extinct could the swamp harrier become established. See the article swamp harrier for details.)	I	I	I	P	P	P		
Black kite Milvus migrans		V	V							
Eyles's harrier Circus teauteensis		X	X							
Haast's eagle Hieraaetus moorei			X	X						
White-bellied sea eagle Haliaeetus leucogaster		V								

== True owls ==
Order: Strigiformes Family: Strigidae

Typical owls are small to large solitary nocturnal birds of prey. They have large forward-facing eyes and ears, a hawk-like beak and a conspicuous circle of feathers around each eye called a facial disk.

Species	Kermadecs	North I	South I	Stewart	Chathams	Snares	Auckland	Campbell	Antipodes	Bounty
Little owl Athene noctua			I							
Morepork (Māori: ruru) Ninox novaeseelandiae		B	B	B		V				
Laughing owl (Māori: whēkau) Ninox albifacies		X	X	X						

== Barn owls ==
Order: Strigiformes Family: Tytonidae

Barn owls are medium to large owls with large heads and characteristic heart-shaped faces. They have long strong legs with powerful talons.

Species	Kermadecs	North I	South I	Stewart	Chathams	Snares	Auckland	Campbell	Antipodes	Bounty
Eastern barn owl Tyto javanica		B	V							

== Kingfishers ==
Order: Coraciiformes Family: Alcedinidae

Kingfishers are medium-sized birds with large heads, long, pointed bills, short legs, and stubby tails.

Species	Kermadecs	North I	South I	Stewart	Chathams	Snares	Auckland	Campbell	Antipodes	Bounty
Laughing kookaburra Dacelo novaeguineae		I	V							
Sacred kingfisher (Māori: kōtare) Todiramphus sanctus	B	B	B	B	V					

== Rollers ==
Order: Coraciiformes Family: Coraciidae

Rollers resemble crows in size and build, but are more closely related to the kingfishers and bee-eaters. They share the colourful appearance of those groups with blues and browns predominating. The two inner front toes are connected, but the outer toe is not.

Species	Kermadecs	North I	South I	Stewart	Chathams	Snares	Auckland	Campbell	Antipodes	Bounty
Oriental dollarbird Eurystomus orientalis		V	V							

== Falcons and caracaras ==
Order: Falconiformes Family: Falconidae

Falconidae is a family of diurnal birds of prey, notably the falcons and caracaras. They differ from hawks, eagles and kites in that they kill with their beaks instead of their talons.

Species	Kermadecs	North I	South I	Stewart	Chathams	Snares	Auckland	Campbell	Antipodes	Bounty
Nankeen kestrel Falco cenchroides		V	V							
New Zealand falcon (Māori: kārearea) Falco novaeseelandiae		B	B	P	ex	P	B			
Black falcon Falco subniger		V								

== Kea and kākā ==
Order: Psittaciformes Family: Nestoridae

The genus Nestor is the type and only extant genus of the parrot family Nestoridae. The genus Nestor contains two extant parrot species from New Zealand and two extinct species from Norfolk Island, Australia and Chatham Island, New Zealand, respectively.

Species	Kermadecs	North I	South I	Stewart	Chathams	Snares	Auckland	Campbell	Antipodes	Bounty
Kea Nestor notabilis		ex	B							
Kākā Nestor meridionalis		B	B	B						
Chatham kākā Nestor chathamensis					X					

== Kākāpō ==
Order: Psittaciformes Family: Strigopidae

The kākāpō, also known as owl parrot (Strigops habroptilus), is a species of large, flightless, nocturnal, ground-dwelling parrot of the super-family Strigopoidea, endemic to New Zealand.

Species	Kermadecs	North I	South I	Stewart	Chathams	Snares	Auckland	Campbell	Antipodes	Bounty
Kākāpō Strigops habroptilus		B	B	B						

== Cockatoos ==
Order: Psittaciformes Family: Cacatuidae

The cockatoos share many features with other parrots including the characteristic curved beak shape and a zygodactyl foot, with two forward toes and two backwards toes. They differ, however in a number of characteristics, including the often spectacular movable headcrest.

Species	Kermadecs	North I	South I	Stewart	Chathams	Snares	Auckland	Campbell	Antipodes	Bounty
Galah Eolophus roseicapilla		I								
Sulphur-crested cockatoo Cacatua galerita		I	I							

== Old world parrots ==
Order: Psittaciformes Family: Psittaculidae

Characteristic features of parrots include a strong curved bill, an upright stance, strong legs, and clawed zygodactyl feet. Many parrots are vividly coloured, and some are multi-coloured. In size they range from 8 cm (3.1 in) to 1 m (3.3 ft) in length. Old World parrots are found from Africa east across south and southeast Asia and Oceania to Australia and New Zealand.

Species	Kermadecs	North I	South I	Stewart	Chathams	Snares	Auckland	Campbell	Antipodes	Bounty
Rose-ringed parakeet Psittacula krameri		I	I							
Antipodes parakeet Cyanoramphus unicolor									B	
Red-crowned parakeet (Māori: kākāriki) Cyanoramphus novaezelandiae	B	B	B	B	B		B			
Reischek's parakeet Cyanoramphus hochstetteri									B	
Yellow-crowned parakeet (Māori: kākāriki) Cyanoramphus auriceps		B	B	B			B			
Chatham parakeet Cyanoramphus forbesi					B					
Malherbe's parakeet (Māori: kākāriki karaka) Cyanoramphus malherbi			B							
Crimson rosella Platycercus elegans		I	I							
Eastern rosella Platycercus eximius		I	I	V						
Rainbow lorikeet Trichoglossus moluccanus		I								

== New Zealand wrens ==
Order: Passeriformes Family: Acanthisittidae

The New Zealand wrens are a family (Acanthisittidae) of tiny passerines endemic to New Zealand. They were represented by six known species in four or five genera, although only two species survive in two genera today. They are understood to form a distinct lineage within the passerines, but authorities differ on their assignment to the oscines or suboscines (the two suborders that between them make up the Passeriformes).

Species	Kermadecs	North I	South I	Stewart	Chathams	Snares	Auckland	Campbell	Antipodes	Bounty
Lyall's wren Traversia lyalli		X	X							
Rifleman (Māori: titipounamu) Acanthisitta chloris		B	B	ex						
Bushwren (Māori: mātuhituhi) Xenicus longipes		X	X	X						
New Zealand rock wren (Māori: pīwauwau) Xenicus gilviventris			B							
North Island stout-legged wren Xenicus jagmi		X								
South Island stout-legged wren Xenicus yaldwyni			X							
Long-billed wren Dendroscansor decurvirostris			X							

== Honeyeaters ==
Order: Passeriformes Family: Meliphagidae

The honeyeaters are a large and diverse family, Meliphagidae, of small to medium-sized birds. The family includes the Australian chats, myzomelas, friarbirds, wattlebirds, miners and melidectes. They are most common in Australia and New Guinea, but also found in New Zealand, the Pacific islands as far east as Samoa and Tonga, and the islands to the north and west of New Guinea known as Wallacea.

Species	Kermadecs	North I	South I	Stewart	Chathams	Snares	Auckland	Campbell	Antipodes	Bounty
Tūī Prosthemadera novaeseelandiae	B	B	B	B	B		B			
New Zealand bellbird (Māori: korimako) Anthornis melanura		B	B	B		B	V			
Chatham bellbird Anthornis melanocephala					X					
Red wattlebird Anthochaera carunculata		V								

== Scrubwrens, thornbills, and gerygones ==
Order: Passeriformes Family: Acanthizidae

The Acanthizidae are small- to medium-sized birds with short rounded wings, slender bills, long legs, and a short tail.

Species	Kermadecs	North I	South I	Stewart	Chathams	Snares	Auckland	Campbell	Antipodes	Bounty
Grey warbler (Māori: riroriro) Gerygone igata		B	B	B		V				
Chatham gerygone Gerygone albofrontata					B					

== Cuckooshrikes and trillers ==
Order: Passeriformes Family: Campephagidae

The cuckooshrikes are small to medium-sized passerine birds. They are predominantly greyish with white and black, although some minivet species are brightly coloured.

Species	Kermadecs	North I	South I	Stewart	Chathams	Snares	Auckland	Campbell	Antipodes	Bounty
Black-faced cuckooshrike Coracina novaehollandiae		V	V	V						
White-winged triller Lalage tricolor			V							

== Whiteheads ==
Order: Passeriformes Family: Mohouidae

Mohoua is a small genus of three bird species endemic to New Zealand. The scientific name is taken from mohua – the Māori name for the yellowhead. Their taxonomic placement has presented problems: They have typically been placed in the whistler family, Pachycephalidae, but in 2013 it was established that they are best placed in their own family, Mohouidae.

Species	Kermadecs	North I	South I	Stewart	Chathams	Snares	Auckland	Campbell	Antipodes	Bounty
Whitehead (Māori: pōpokotea) Mohoua albicilla		B								
Yellowhead (Māori: mohua) Mohoua ochrocephala			B	B						
Pipipi (Māori: pīpipi) Mohoua novaeseelandiae			B	B						

== Old World orioles ==
Order: Passeriformes Family: Oriolidae

The Old World orioles are colourful passerine birds which are not closely related to the New World orioles

Species	Kermadecs	North I	South I	Stewart	Chathams	Snares	Auckland	Campbell	Antipodes	Bounty
South Island piopio Turnagra capensis			X							
North Island piopio Turnagra tanagra		X								

== Woodswallows, bellmagpies, and allies ==
Order: Passeriformes Family: Artamidae

The woodswallows are soft-plumaged, somber-coloured passerine birds. They are smooth, agile flyers with moderately large, semi-triangular wings.

Species	Kermadecs	North I	South I	Stewart	Chathams	Snares	Auckland	Campbell	Antipodes	Bounty
Masked woodswallow Artamus personatus			V							
White-browed woodswallow Artamus superciliosus		V	V							
Dusky woodswallow Artamus cyanopterus				V						
Australian magpie Gymnorhina tibicen		I	I							

== Fantails ==
Order: Passeriformes Family: Rhipiduridae

The fantails are small insectivorous birds with longish, frequently fanned, tails.

Species	Kermadecs	North I	South I	Stewart	Chathams	Snares	Auckland	Campbell	Antipodes	Bounty
New Zealand fantail (Māori: pīwakawaka) Rhipidura fuliginosa		B	B	B	B	ex				
Willie wagtail Rhipidura leucophrys					V					

== Monarch flycatchers ==
Order: Passeriformes Family: Monarchidae

The monarch flycatchers are small to medium-sized insectivorous passerines which hunt by gleaning, hovering or flycatching.

Species	Kermadecs	North I	South I	Stewart	Chathams	Snares	Auckland	Campbell	Antipodes	Bounty
Black-faced monarch Monarcha melanopsis		V								
Magpie-lark Grallina cyanoleuca			V							
Satin flycatcher Myiagra cyanoleuca		V	V							

== Crows, jays, and magpies ==
Order: Passeriformes Family: Corvidae

The family Corvidae includes crows, ravens, jays, choughs, magpies, treepies, nutcrackers, and ground jays. Corvids are above average in size among the Passeriformes, and some of the larger species show high levels of intelligence.

Species	Kermadecs	North I	South I	Stewart	Chathams	Snares	Auckland	Campbell	Antipodes	Bounty
New Zealand raven Corvus moriorum		X	X	X	X					
Rook Corvus frugilegus		I	I	I	I					

== New Zealand wattlebirds ==
Order: Passeriformes Family: Callaeidae

Callaeidae (sometimes Callaeatidae) is a family of passerine birds endemic to New Zealand. It contains three genera, with five species in the family. One species, the huia, became extinct early in the 20th century, while the South Island kōkako is critically endangered and may be extinct.

Species	Kermadecs	North I	South I	Stewart	Chathams	Snares	Auckland	Campbell	Antipodes	Bounty
North Island kōkako Callaeas wilsoni		B								
South Island kōkako Callaeas cinereus			B?	ex						
North Island saddleback Philesturnus rufusater		B								
South Island saddleback Philesturnus carunculatus			B	B						
Huia Heteralocha acutirostris		X								

== Stitchbird ==
Order: Passeriformes Family: Notiomystidae

The stitchbird or hihi (Notiomystis cincta) is a honeyeater-like bird endemic to the North Island and adjacent offshore islands of New Zealand. Its evolutionary relationships have long puzzled ornithologists, but it is now classed as the only member of its own family, the Notiomystidae.

Species	Kermadecs	North I	South I	Stewart	Chathams	Snares	Auckland	Campbell	Antipodes	Bounty
Stitchbird (Māori: hihi) Notiomystis cincta		B								

== Australasian robins ==
Order: Passeriformes Family: Petroicidae

The bird family Petroicidae includes 49 species in 19 genera. All are endemic to Australasia: New Guinea, Australia, New Zealand and numerous Pacific Islands as far east as Samoa. For want of an accurate common name, the family is often called the Australasian robins. Within the family the species are known not only as robins but as scrub-robins and flyrobins. They are, however, only distantly related to the Old World family Muscicapidae (to which other species with such names belong) and the monarch flycatchers (Monarchidae).

Species	Kermadecs	North I	South I	Stewart	Chathams	Snares	Auckland	Campbell	Antipodes	Bounty
North Island robin Petroica longipes		B								
South Island robin Petroica australis			B	B						
Tomtit (Māori: miromiro) Petroica macrocephala		B	B	B	B	B	B			
Black robin Petroica traversi					B					

== Larks ==
Order: Passeriformes Family: Alaudidae

Larks are small terrestrial birds with often extravagant songs and display flights. Most larks are fairly dull in appearance. Their food is insects and seeds.

Species	Kermadecs	North I	South I	Stewart	Chathams	Snares	Auckland	Campbell	Antipodes	Bounty
Eurasian skylark Alauda arvensis		I	I		I					

== Reed warblers and allies ==
Order: Passeriformes Family: Acrocephalidae

The members of this family are usually rather large for "warblers". Most are rather plain olivaceous brown above with much yellow to beige below. They are usually found in open woodland, reedbeds, or tall grass. The family occurs mostly in southern to western Eurasia and surroundings, but it also ranges far into the Pacific, with some species in Africa.

Species	Kermadecs	North I	South I	Stewart	Chathams	Snares	Auckland	Campbell	Antipodes	Bounty
Australian reed warbler Acrocephalus australis			V							

== Grassbirds and allies ==
Order: Passeriformes Family: Locustellidae

Locustellidae are a family of small insectivorous songbirds found mainly in Eurasia, Africa, and the Australian region. They are smallish birds with tails that are usually long and pointed, and tend to be drab brownish or buffy all over.

Species	Kermadecs	North I	South I	Stewart	Chathams	Snares	Auckland	Campbell	Antipodes	Bounty
Chatham fernbird Poodytes rufescens					X					
New Zealand fernbird (Māori: kōtātā or mātātā) Poodytes punctatus		B	B	B		B				

== Swallows ==
Order: Passeriformes Family: Hirundinidae

The family Hirundinidae is adapted to aerial feeding. They have a slender streamlined body, long pointed wings, and a short bill with a wide gape. The feet are adapted to perching rather than walking, and the front toes are partially joined at the base.

Species	Kermadecs	North I	South I	Stewart	Chathams	Snares	Auckland	Campbell	Antipodes	Bounty
Welcome swallow Hirundo neoxena	B	B	B	B	B	P	P	V		
Fairy martin Petrochelidon ariel		V	V			V				
Tree martin Petrochelidon nigricans		V	V		V	V				

== Bulbuls ==
Order: Passeriformes Family: Pycnonotidae

Bulbuls are medium-sized songbirds. Some are colourful with yellow, red, or orange vents, cheeks, throats, or supercilia, but most are drab, with uniform olive-brown to black plumage. Some species have distinct crests.

Species	Kermadecs	North I	South I	Stewart	Chathams	Snares	Auckland	Campbell	Antipodes	Bounty
Red-vented bulbul Pycnonotus cafer		I								

== White-eyes ==
Order: Passeriformes Family: Zosteropidae

The white-eyes are small birds of rather drab appearance, the plumage above being typically greenish-olive, but some species have a white or bright yellow throat, breast, or lower parts, and several have buff flanks. As the name suggests, many species have a white ring around each eye.

Species	Kermadecs	North I	South I	Stewart	Chathams	Snares	Auckland	Campbell	Antipodes	Bounty
Silvereye (Māori: tauhou) Zosterops lateralis	B	B	B	B	B	B	B	B	B	

== Starlings ==
Order: Passeriformes Family: Sturnidae

Starlings are small to medium-sized passerine birds. Their flight is strong and direct and they are very gregarious. Their preferred habitat is fairly open country. They eat insects and fruit. Plumage is typically dark with a metallic sheen.

Species	Kermadecs	North I	South I	Stewart	Chathams	Snares	Auckland	Campbell	Antipodes	Bounty
Common starling Sturnus vulgaris	I	I	I	I	I	I	I	I	I	V
Common myna Acridotheres tristis		I								

== Thrushes ==
Order: Passeriformes Family: Turdidae

The thrushes are a group of passerine birds that occur mainly in the Old World. They are plump, soft plumaged, small to medium-sized insectivores or sometimes omnivores, often feeding on the ground. Many have attractive songs.

Species	Kermadecs	North I	South I	Stewart	Chathams	Snares	Auckland	Campbell	Antipodes	Bounty
Song thrush Turdus philomelos	I	I	I	I	I	I	V	V	V	
Common blackbird Turdus merula	I	I	I	I	I	I	I	I	V	

== Accentors ==
Order: Passeriformes Family: Prunellidae

The accentors are a genus of birds in the family Prunellidae, which is the only bird family endemic to the Palearctic. This small group of closely related passerines are all in the genus Prunella.

Species	Kermadecs	North I	South I	Stewart	Chathams	Snares	Auckland	Campbell	Antipodes	Bounty
Dunnock Prunella modularis		I	I	I	I	V	B	B	B	

== Old World sparrows ==
Order: Passeriformes Family: Passeridae

Sparrows are small passerine birds, typically small, plump, brown or grey with short tails and short powerful beaks. They are seed-eaters, but also consume small insects.

Species	Kermadecs	North I	South I	Stewart	Chathams	Snares	Auckland	Campbell	Antipodes	Bounty
House sparrow Passer domesticus		I	I	I	I	V	V	V	V	

== Wagtails and pipits ==
Order: Passeriformes Family: Motacillidae

Motacillidae is a family of small passerine birds with medium to long tails and comprises the wagtails, longclaws, and pipits. These are slender ground-feeding insectivores of open country.

Species	Kermadecs	North I	South I	Stewart	Chathams	Snares	Auckland	Campbell	Antipodes	Bounty
New Zealand pipit (Māori: pīhoihoi) Anthus novaeseelandiae	V	B	B	B	B	V	B		B	

== True finches ==
Order: Passeriformes Family: Fringillidae

Finches are small to moderately large seed-eating passerine birds with a strong beak, usually conical and in some species very large. All have 12 tail feathers and nine primary flight feathers. Finches have a bouncing flight, alternating bouts of flapping with gliding on closed wings, and most sing well.

Species	Kermadecs	North I	South I	Stewart	Chathams	Snares	Auckland	Campbell	Antipodes	Bounty
Common chaffinch Fringilla coelebs	V	I	I	I	I	I	I	I	V	
European greenfinch Chloris chloris	V	I	I	I	I	V		V		
Redpoll Acanthis flammea	I	I	I	I	I	I	I	I	I	
European goldfinch Carduelis carduelis	V	I	I	I	I	V	V	V	V	

== Old World buntings ==
Order: Passeriformes Family: Emberizidae

The emberizids are a large family of seed-eating birds with distinctively shaped bills. Many emberizid species have distinctive head patterns.

Species	Kermadecs	North I	South I	Stewart	Chathams	Snares	Auckland	Campbell	Antipodes	Bounty
Cirl bunting Emberiza cirlus		I	I							
Yellowhammer Emberiza citrinella	I	I	I	I	I	V	V	V	V	

== See also ==
- Lists of birds by region
- List of birds of Australia, New Zealand and Antarctica
- List of birds of the Auckland Islands
- List of birds of the Chatham Islands
- List of birds of the Kermadec Islands
- List of birds of the Antipodes Islands
- List of birds of the Bounty Islands
- List of birds of the Campbell Islands
- List of endemic birds of New Zealand
- Birds of New Zealand
- Fauna of New Zealand
