= List of endemic birds of New Zealand =

Many of New Zealand's bird species are endemic to the country, that is, they are not found in any other country. Of the species breeding in New Zealand before humans arrived, 71% were endemic.

Some species are not fully endemic, but are breeding endemic, in that they breed only in New Zealand, but migrate or range elsewhere.

Population status symbols are those of the Red List published by the International Union for Conservation of Nature. The symbols and their meanings, in increasing order of peril, are:

LC = least concern NT = near threatened VU = vulnerable EN = endangered CR = critically endangered EX = extinct

== Endemic Bird Areas ==
BirdLife International has defined the following Endemic Bird Areas in New Zealand:

- Auckland Islands
- Chatham Islands
- North Island
- South Island

The following are classified as secondary areas, i.e. they have at least one restricted-range bird species, but do not meet the criteria for Endemic Bird Areas:

- Antipodes Islands
- Snares Islands and Stewart Island / Rakiura islets

== List of fully endemic species ==
These species (and subspecies) are found only in New Zealand. They are listed in alphabetical order by common name, with an indicator of their conservation status.

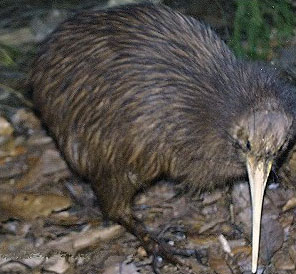
North Island brown kiwi

- Antipodes Island parakeet, Cyanoramphus unicolor VU
- Antipodes snipe, Coenocorypha aucklandica meinertzhagenae
- Auckland Island merganser, Mergus australis EX
- Auckland Island shag, Leucocarbo colensoi VU
- Auckland rail, Lewinia muelleri VU
- Auckland teal, Anas aucklandica VU
- Bellbird (korimako), Anthornis melanura LC
- Black robin, Petroica traversi EN
- Black stilt (kakī), Himantopus novaezelandiae CR
- Black-billed gull (tarāpuka), Chroicocephalus bulleri EN
- Black-fronted tern (tarapirohe), Chlidonias albostriatus EN
- Blue duck (whio), Hymenolaimus malacorhynchos EN
- Bounty Island shag, Leucocarbo ranfurlyi VU
- Brown creeper (pipipi), Mohoua novaeseelandiae LC
- Brown teal (pāteke), Anas chlorotis EN
- Bushwren (mātuhituhi), Xenicus longipes EX
- Campbell Island shag, Leucocarbo campbelli VU
- Campbell snipe, Coenocorypha aucklandica perseverance
- Campbell teal, Anas nesiotis EN
- Chatham Island bellbird, Anthornis melanocephala EX
- Chatham Island fernbird, Megalurus rufescens EX
- Chatham island oystercatcher (tōrea tai), Haematopus chathamensis EN
- Chatham Island pigeon (parea), Hemiphaga chathamensis VU
- Chatham Island rail, Cabalus modestus EX
- Chatham Island shag, Leucocarbo onslowi CR
- Chatham Island snipe, Coenocorypha pusilla VU
- Chatham Island warbler (riroriro), Gerygone albofrontata LC
- Chatham parakeet (Forbes' parakeet), Cyanoramphus forbesi EN
- Dieffenbach's rail (moeriki), Gallirallus dieffenbachii EX
- Fernbird (matata), Megalurus punctatus LC
- Fiordland crested penguin (tawaki), Eudyptes pachyrhynchus VU
- Foveaux shag (kawau), Leucocarbo stewarti VU
- Great spotted kiwi (roa), Apteryx haastii VU
- Grey warbler (riroriro), Gerygone igata LC
- Hawkin's rail (mehonui), Diaphorapteryx hawkinsi EX
- Hodgens' waterhen, Gallinula hodgenorum EX
- Huia, Heteralocha acutirostris EX
- Kākāpō, Strigops habroptilus CR
- Kea, Nestor notabilis EN
- King shag (kawau), Leucocarbo carunculatus VU
- Laughing owl (whēkau), Sceloglaux albifacies EX
- Little spotted kiwi (kiwi pukupuku), Apteryx owenii NT
- Long-tailed cuckoo (koekoea), Urodynamis taitensis NT
- Lyall's wren (Stephens Island wren), Traversia lyalli EX
- Malherbe's parakeet (orange-fronted parakeet) (kākāriki karaka), Cyanoramphus malherbi CR
- New Zealand bittern (kaoriki), Ixobrychus novaezelandiae EX
- New Zealand dotterel (tuturiwhatu), Charadrius obscurus EN
- New Zealand falcon (kārearea), Falco novaeseelandiae NT
- New Zealand fantail (pīwakawaka), Rhipidura fuliginosa LC
- New Zealand grebe (weweia), Poliocephalus rufopectus VU
- New Zealand kaka, Nestor meridionalis EN
- New Zealand pigeon (kererū), Hemiphaga novaeseelandiae NT
- New Zealand quail (koreke), Coturnix novaezelandiae EX
- New Zealand scaup (pāpango), Aythya novaeseelandiae LC
- North Island brown kiwi, Apteryx mantelli EN
- North Island kōkako, Callaeas wilsoni EN
- North Island piopio, Turnagra tanagra EX
- North Island robin (toutouwai), Petroica longipes LC
- North Island saddleback (tīeke), Philesturnus rufusater NT
- North Island snipe, Coenocorypha barrierensis EX
- North Island takahē (mōho), Porphyrio mantelli EX
- Okarito brown kiwi (rowi), Apteryx rowi CR
- Otago shag (kawau), Leucocarbo chalconotus VU
- Paradise shelduck (pūtangitangi), Tadorna variegata LC
- Pipit (pihoihoi), Anthus novaeseelandiae LC
- Pitt shag, Phalacrocorax featherstoni EN
- Red-billed gull (tarāpunga), Chroicocephalus novaehollandiae scopulinus LC
- Red-fronted parakeet (kākāriki), Cyanoramphus novaezelandiae VU
- Reischek's parakeet, Cyanoramphus hochstetteri
- Rifleman (titipounamu), Acanthisitta chloris LC
- Rock wren (piwauwau), Xenicus gilviventris VU
- Shore plover (tūturuatu), Thinornis novaeseelandiae EN
- Snares snipe (tutukiwi), Coenocorypha huegeli NT
- South Island kōkako, Callaeas cinereus CR
- South Island pied oystercatcher (tōrea), Haematopus finschi LC
- South Island piopio, Turnagra capensis EX
- South Island robin (toutouwai), Petroica australis LC
- South Island saddleback (tīeke), Philesturnus carunculatus NT
- South Island snipe (tutukiwi), Coenocorypha iredalei) EX
- South Island takahē (takahē), Porphyrio hochstetteri VU
- Southern brown kiwi (tokoeka), Apteryx australis VU
- Spotted shag (parekareka), Phalacrocorax punctatus LC
- Stitchbird (hihi), Notiomystis cincta VU
- Subantarctic snipe, Coenocorypha aucklandica LC
- Tomtit (miromiro), Petroica macrocephala LC
- Tūī, Prosthemadera novaeseelandiae LC
- Variable oystercatcher (tōrea tai), Haematopus unicolor LC
- Weka, Gallirallus australis VU
- Whitehead (pōpokatea), Mohoua albicilla LC
- Wrybill (ngutuparore), Anarhynchus frontalis VU
- Yellow-crowned parakeet (kākāriki), Cyanoramphus auriceps NT
- Yellow-eyed penguin (hoiho), Megadyptes antipodes EN
- Yellowhead (mōhua), Mohoua ochrocephala EN

== List of breeding-endemic species ==
These species breed only in New Zealand, but are found elsewhere also, so are not fully endemic. They include seabirds that range elsewhere and migratory birds.

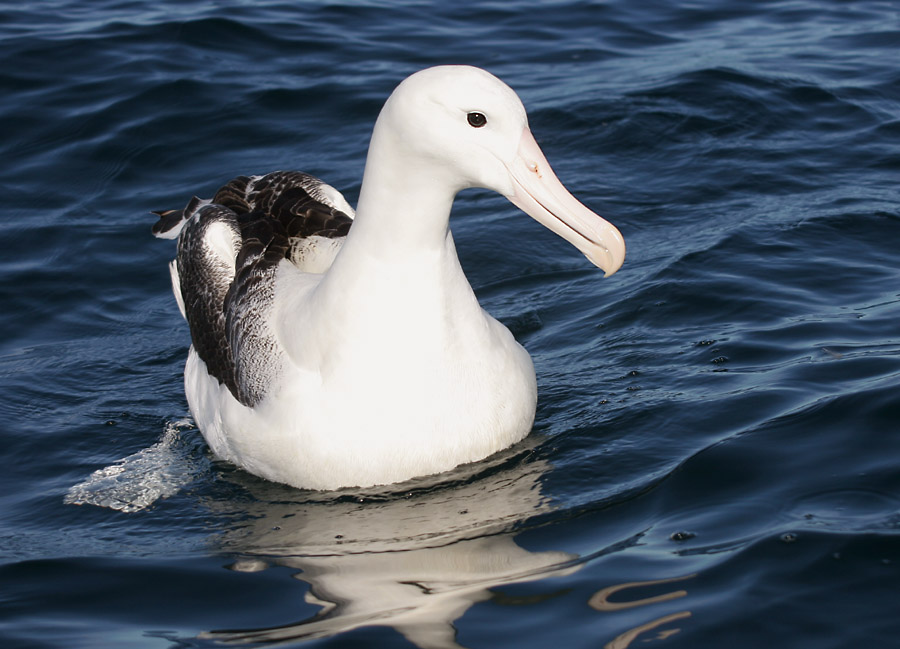
Southern royal albatross

- Black petrel, Procellaria parkinsoni VU
- Buller's albatross, Thalassarche bulleri NT
- Buller's shearwater, Ardenna bulleri VU
- Chatham petrel, Pterodroma axillaris VU
- Cook's petrel, Pterodroma cookii VU
- Double-banded plover, Charadrius bicinctus NT
- Erect-crested penguin, Eudyptes sclateri EN
- Fiordland crested penguin, Eudyptes pachyrhynchus VU
- Fluttering shearwater, Puffinus gavia LC
- Grey-faced petrel, Pterodroma gouldi LC
- Hutton's shearwater, Puffinus huttoni EN
- Magenta petrel, Pterodroma magentae CR
- Mottled petrel, Pterodroma inexpectata NT
- Pacific long-tailed cuckoo, Urodynamis taitensis LC
- Pycroft's petrel, Pterodroma pycrofti VU
- Snares crested penguin, Eudyptes robustus VU
- Southern royal albatross, Diomedea epomophora VU
- Westland petrel (tāiko), Procellaria westlandica VU
- Whenua Hou diving petrel, Pelecanoides whenuahouensis
- White-necked petrel, Pterodroma cervicalis VU
- Yellow-eyed penguin (hoiho), Megadyptes antipodes EN

== See also ==
- List of birds of New Zealand
