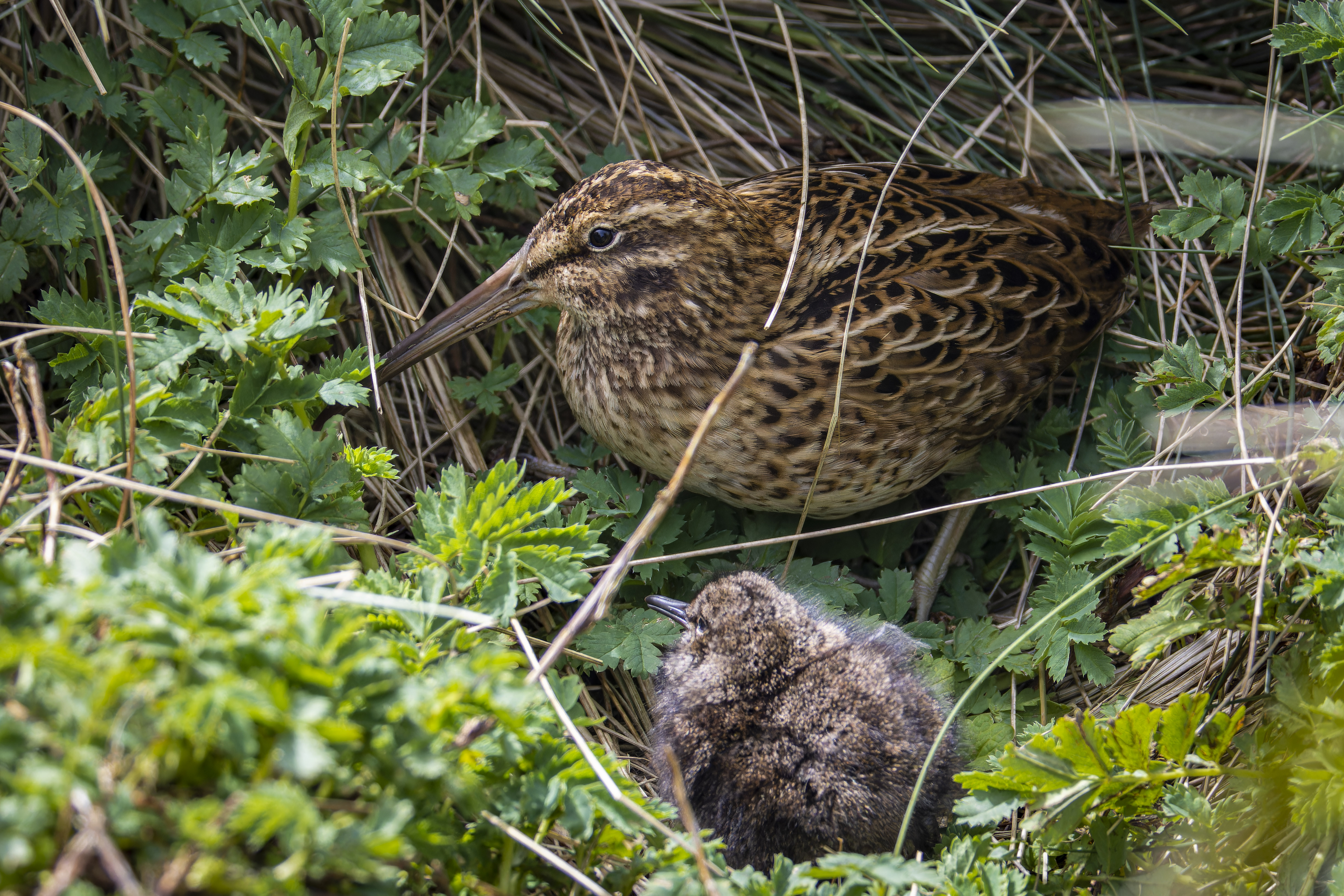
- Auckland Island snipe with chick on Enderby Island

Scientific classification
- Kingdom: Animalia
- Phylum: Chordata
- Class: Aves
- Order: Charadriiformes
- Family: Scolopacidae
- Genus: Coenocorypha
- Species: C. aucklandica
- Subspecies: C. a. aucklandica

Trinomial name
- Coenocorypha aucklandica aucklandica (Gray, 1844)
- Native range

Synonyms
- Gallinago aucklandica Gray 1845; Scolopax holmesii Peale, 1848; Scolopax auclandica; Gallinago tristrami Rothschild 1893 (in error)

= Auckland snipe =

Auckland Island snipe

Subspecies of bird

The Auckland Snipe (Coenocorypha aucklandica aucklandica), also known as the Auckland Island Snipe, is a small, cryptic bird in the sandpiper family. It is the nominate subspecies of the Subantarctic Snipe (Coenocorypha aucklandica) and is endemic to the Auckland Islands, a subantarctic island group south of New Zealand in the Southern Ocean. Ground-dwelling birds with reduced flight capacity, Auckland Snipes are rarely seen. They live in the dense tussock, fern and shrub-forest vegetation on the outlying islands of the archipelago, which are free of introduced mammalian predators. The subspecies suffered major population losses and range reductions due to the introduction of feral cats and pigs to the main Auckland Island in the early nineteenth century—on which it is no longer found—but healthy populations persist across the smaller sub-islands in the group.

== Taxonomy ==
The Auckland Snipe belongs to the genus Coenocorypha, an austral snipe lineage endemic to New Zealand and surrounding subantarctic islands.

The first Austral Snipe was recorded in 1807 by Abraham Bristow. He observed these birds specifically within the Auckland Islands group; the population he encountered is what we today classify as the Auckland Snipe. The species was again noted in January 1830. The first specimen was collected in Port Ross in March 1840 by Silas Holmes who intended to name it Scolopax holmesii, but due to delayed publication, its scientific description fell to George Robert Gray in 1845, as Gallinago aucklandica, based on specimens collected by Robert McCormick on Enderby Island in November-December 1840. Gray subsequently established the distinct genus Coenocorypha in 1855 to separate the short-winged, sedentary, ground-dwelling snipes of New Zealand from the migratory Northern Hemisphere snipes in the genus Gallinago. The species name and subspecific epithet aucklandica refers to the type locality (the Auckland Islands, named after William Eden, 1^{st} Baron Auckland).

Historically, all extant and recently extinct non-Chatham Coenocorypha populations were treated as subspecies of a single polytypic species (species split into two or more subspecies), Coenocorypha aucklandica. Modern morphological, behavioural, and genetic analyses support recognizing three distinct phylogenetic species: the Chatham Island Snipe (C. pusilla), the Snares Island Snipe (C. huegeli), and the Subantarctic Snipe (C. aucklandica). Molecular studies indicate that Coenocorypha aucklandica diverged from its sister lineages approximately 96,000 years ago during the Pleistocene epoch. So, snipe likely persisted in the subantarctic region through Pleistocene glacial cycles rather than colonising post-glacially.

Within C. aucklandica, three extant subspecies are recognized: the Auckland Snipe (C. a. aucklandica), the Antipodes Island Snipe (C. a. meinertzhagenae), and the Campbell Island Snipe (C. a. perseverance), alongside the now extinct South Island Snipe (C. a. iredalei) and North Island Snipe (C. a. barrierensis). Although the Auckland Snipe shares ancestral DNA with the Antipodes and Campbell subspecies, genetic testing confirms the Auckland Snipe as a distinct population.

== Description ==
C. a. aucklandica, like others in the genus, is a small cryptic species with a proportionally long bill and short neck, legs and tail and short rounded wings. The subspecies has much individual variation, from dark and brown to paler and rufous. Adults measure 21-24 cm in total length, have a wingspan of 30-35 cm and weigh between 90 and 120g. Sexual dimorphism is minimal: males tend to be darker than females and females average a marginally larger body size and mass.

The head has a mottled black-brown and rufous crown, a dark brown central strips, a dark eyestripe, and a contrasting pale eyebrow (supercilium). The back and shoulders are greyish brown with dark blotches, featuring pale feather edges that form distinct parallel stripes along the back. The chin, throat and central belly are unmarked cream to pale buff. The upper chest is densely streaked with brown, while the flanks are rich brown with prominent chevron markings. The wings are grey brown with pale-flecked edges. The long bill is pinkish grey with a dark tip, and the legs range from olive-yellow in males to grey-olive in females.

Morphometric analyses have also demonstrated geographical variation within the Auckland Islands group: snipe from Adams Island are significantly smaller in bill, wing, and tarsus measurements than snipe from the northern Port Ross islands (Enderby, Rose, and Ewing).

==== Juveniles ====
Chicks have sooty brown natal down tipped with greyish-buff, featuring greyish-white underparts, a dark central crown stripe, and dark eyestripes.

Juveniles resemble adults but with duller grey-brown plumage, less defined facial markings, and a spotted rather than streaked chest. Their bill is shorter with a dull pinkish base, and the legs and feet are grey.

== Distribution and Habitat ==
The Auckland Snipe is endemic to the Auckland Islands archipelago, which are approximately 465 km south of mainland New Zealand. Auckland Snipe occupy all types of dense ground cover vegetation (tussock grasslands, Olearia forest, shrublands, herb- and fern-fields). The bird originally occurred across all vegetated suitable islands in the archipelago, but following human discovery and subsequent introduced mammalian predators (feral cats (Felis catus) and feral pigs (Sus scrofa)), the snipe was extirpated from the main Auckland Island prior to 1840.

Throughout the twentieth century, viable breeding populations were restricted to predator-free Adams Island, Disappointment Island and Ewing Island. Snipe also survived in low numbers, or persisted undetected, on Enderby and Rose Island despite habitat modification by fire and grazing from introduced mammals. Following the total eradication of cattle, rabbits, and mice from Enderby and Rose Islands in 1993, snipe rapidly expanded and grew abundant on both islands. Breeding has also been recorded on Ocean Island and dispersing birds have been confirmed on small islets such as Dundas Island and Figure of Eight Island.

== Behaviour and Ecology ==
Like other members of its genus, the Auckland Snipe is solitary, highly territorial, and predominantly terrestrial. The birds move with a crouched shuffle and their flight is weak and reluctant, unless performing nocturnal aerial displays. They only take low, short flights (3-20 m), and only when flushed at close range.

The subspecies’ vocal activity occurs almost exclusively at night (and during dusk/dawn). It is also sedentary within the Auckland Islands, with no recorded inter-island movements beyond short dispersal flights across narrow channels within the archipelago.

=== Diet ===
Auckland Snipe, as with all Coenocorypha species, are insectivores; their diet consists of soil-dwelling and leaf-litter invertebrates (earthworms, amphipods, adult and larval beetles, and the larvae and pupae of flies). Foraging occurs almost entirely by probing moist soil and mud. Rhynchokinesis allows the tip of the upper mandible to open while buried, enabling the bird to grasp prey underground. Sensory Herbst’s corpuscles at the bill tip detect low-frequency vibrations generated by moving invertebrates.

=== Vocalisation ===
The vocalisations of the Auckland Snipe are limited and rarely recorded. The primary call of territorial males is a repeated disyllabic whistle, described as “trerk trerk trerk” or “queeyoo queeyoo queeyoo”. Unlike Snares Snipe (which often call in the day), Auckland Snipe give loud calls almost exclusively at night. Females produce a soft, wavering, descending call described as a “chur chur” in response to male calls.

The subspecies performs the Hakawai nocturnal aerial display, a shared behavioural trait across almost the entire genus (save for the Snares Island Snipe for which it has not been recorded). Performed at night during the breeding season, the display consists of high-altitude flight where the male delivers a sequence of 4-8 disyllabic whistles followed by a steep, high-speed dive. As the bird dives, a loud, non-vocal “roar” (like a jet engine) is produced as air rushes through its splayed outer tail feathers. This causes characteristic V-shaped wear on the outer tail feathers of displaying males.

=== Breeding ===
Auckland Snipe are monogamous and nest solitarily in defended territories. On the Auckland Islands, egg-laying occurs from mid-September through late January, peaking in late November. Chicks hatch between November and February. The female builds a shallow cup nest on the ground using grass, sedges, and leaf detritus, hidden under dense vegetation.

Clutch sizes consist of two eggs that are light brown to olive and heavily blotched with dark brown. Both parents share incubation over about 22 days, with males incubating at night and females by day. Chicks are precocial and leave the nest within hours of hatching. The brood is split between the parents: the male cares for the first chick, while the female takes the second. Each parent raises its chick independently without interacting with the mate. Parents feed their young bill-to-bill for the first 13 days until chicks begin probing on their own. Chicks fledge (attain flight) at around 30 days old but reach full independence at around 60 days.

== Status and Conservation ==
The total population of the Auckland Snipe is estimated to be greater than 20,000 individuals. Under the New Zealand Threat Classification System, the subspecies is classified as At Risk / Naturally Uncommon due to its restriction to a single subantarctic archipelago. Globally, the Subantarctic Snipe species is evaluated as Near Threatened by the IUCN.

The primary historical threat to the Auckland Snipe was predation from introduced terrestrial mammals. Feral cats and pigs caused total extirpation on the main Auckland Island. On Enderby and Rose Islands, introduced cattle, sheep, rabbits, and house mice severely depleted ground cover, exposing snipe to avian predators like Southern Skuas (Catharacta antarctica) and New Zealand Falcons (Falco novaeseelandiae).

Following the eradication of all introduced mammals from Enderby and Rose Islands in 1993, Auckland Snipe populations recovered rapidly, reaching high densities in regenerated tussock and shrubland habitats.

The New Zealand Department of Conservation is planning the Maukahuka Project, a large-scale pest eradication initiative aimed at removing feral cats, pigs, and mice from the main Auckland Island. Eradication of these predators will allow the Auckland Snipe to naturally recolonize its largest former habitat, restoring gene flow throughout the archipelago and securing 100% of its historic range. Conservation managers recommend that if assisted translocations are required to prevent founder effects on the main island, founder stock should be sourced from all four genetic refugia (with Adams Island prioritized, as it has the highest genetic diversity).
