= Hakawai (mythology) =

Bird in Māori mythology

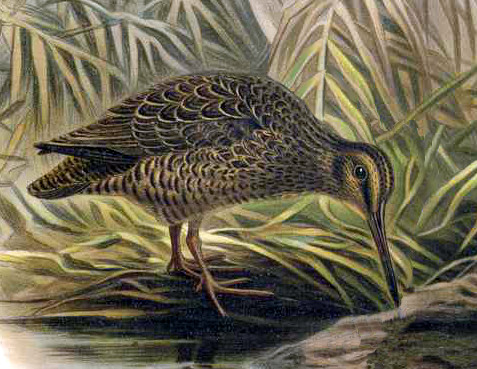
Coenocorypha aucklandica, illustration from Walter Buller's 1888 Birds of New Zealand

Hakawai, also Hōkioi in the North Island, was to the New Zealand Māori people, a mythological bird that was sometimes heard but not usually seen. It is now associated with the nocturnal aerial displays made by Coenocorypha snipe.

== Mythology ==
In Māori mythology the Hakawai was one of eleven tapu (sacred) birds of Raka-maomao, a god of wind. The Hakawai lived in the heavens and only descended to the earth at night. It was considered to be a gigantic bird of prey and was described (as the Hōkioi) by a Ngāti Apa chief, to the Governor of New Zealand Sir George Grey, as:

Its colour was red and black and white. It was a bird of (black) feathers, tinged with yellow and green; it had a bunch of red feathers on the top of its head. It was a large bird, as large as the moa.

Hearing the Hakawai was considered to be a bad omen, traditionally presaging war. Ornithologists in New Zealand have wondered whether the myth related to a real bird, whether extinct or still living, with some claiming that the myth was inspired by the now extinct Haast's eagle (Hieraaetus moorei).

Although mention of the Hakawai occurred in Māori mythology throughout New Zealand, since European settlement of the main islands direct experience of the Hakawai – through hearing the sounds it made – was largely restricted to the Muttonbird Islands, several small islands in the vicinity of Foveaux Strait and Stewart Island, in the far south of New Zealand. The Muttonbird Islands have no permanent human residents but are visited seasonally, from mid-March to the end of May, for muttonbirding – the harvesting of sooty shearwater chicks for food and oil. There the sound ascribed to the Hakawai was described as having two main components, the first part being vocal, a call rendered as hakwai, hakwai, hakwai, followed by a non-vocal roar as of an object travelling through the air at high speed. It was heard on calm, moonlit nights and appeared to come from a great height.

== Investigation ==
During the 1980s ornithologist Dr Colin Miskelly, who was studying the New Zealand snipe genus Coenocorypha, after hearing and recording the aerial display of the Chatham snipe (C. pusilla), investigated the possibility that the sounds attributed to the Hakawai in the Muttonbird Islands were made by the recently extinct South Island snipe (Coenocorypha iredalei), then usually called the Stewart Island snipe and considered to be a subspecies of the subantarctic snipe (Coenocorypha aucklandica), a small, unobtrusive, brown bird some 21–24 cm in length.

Miskelly interviewed several muttonbirders who had memories of hearing the distinctive sounds of the Hakawai. He found that its apparent range had steadily decreased over the years to the early 1960s when it was heard no more. The non-vocal sounds made by the Hakawai were described variously as "a sound as if a cable chain was lowered into a boat" a "jet-stream", a "blind rolling itself up" or "a shell passing overhead". The reaction to the sounds by those who heard it was generally one of fright.

The decrease towards extinction paralleled that of the South Island snipe, of which the Muttonbird Islands were the final refuge, with the islands being progressively occupied by rats, feral cats and weka. The last known individuals of the snipe died in 1964 on Big South Cape Island following the accidental introduction of black rats there.

Snipe in the genera Gallinago and Lymnocryptes, as well as the closely related woodcocks Scolopax, make courtship display flights, at dusk and on moonlit nights, producing mechanical sounds called "drumming", "bleating" or "winnowing", through the vibration of their modified outer tail feathers caused by the rush of air in the course of a power dive. Of his research in the Chatham Islands Miskelly wrote:

I studied Chatham Snipe on South East and Mangere Islands during November 1983 to January 1984 and in July 1986, and recorded three different kinds of aerial displays. All these displays were performed at night; the most spectacular display included both a vocal and a non-vocal component. This display was indeed hair-raising when I first heard it. The vocal component was a disyllabic call, repeated five times, identical to one of the ground displays given by territorial male Chatham Island Snipe. This was followed by a loud roar, similar to a jet passing overhead, as the bird swooped over the 6 m canopy at high speed. The non-vocal component of the call had three stacked bands (0.7 kHz, 0.9 kHz & 1.2 kHz) and lasted for about 1.5 seconds.

and:

If this aerial display of Chatham Island Snipe is homologous with the "drumming" or "bleating" of Gallinago snipes, the non-vocal part of the call is likely to be created by air currents making the tail feathers vibrate as the bird dives at speed. I found indirect evidence of this on two of the 24 adult male snipe that I handled on South East Island in November 1983 – January 1984. Their tail feathers had unusual wear. The shafts of all 14 rectrices had snapped off about 5 mm from the tip, creating a V at the tip of each feather. I attribute this unusual feather wear to vibrational stress during the display.

Examination of museum skins from bird collections showed such characteristic wear of the tail feathers on male snipe from the Chatham Islands (C. pusilla), islands off Stewart Island (C. iredalei), the Auckland Islands (C. aucklandica aucklandica), and the Antipodes Islands (C. a. meinertzhagenae). Since then the same kind of tail-feather wear has been found on snipe from the Snares Islands (C. huegeli), and Hakawai displays have been heard in the Auckland and Antipodes Islands, as well as from the newly described Campbell snipe (C. a. perseverance) on Campbell Island.

== See also ==
- Pouākai
- Devil Bird, a similar omen in Sri lankan folklore
- Night raven, a similar omen in Germanic folklore
