= Kaffu Chauhan =

Medieval Garhwal chieftain and folk hero

- Other name: Kuffu Chauhan
- Occupations: Chieftain, folk hero
- Era: Medieval Garhwal (16th century)
- Known for: Last independent chieftain of Uppu Garh; resistance to Panwar expansion

Kaffu Chauhan was a 16th-century chieftain of Uppu Garh in the Garhwal region of present-day Uttarakhand, India. He is remembered in folklore and regional history as the last independent Garhpati (chieftain) of Uppu Garh who resisted the consolidation of Garhwal under the Panwar dynasty.

== Historical background ==
Uppu Garh was one of the small principalities in the Western Alaknanda Valley, ruled by Chauhan Rajputs. Kaffu Chauhan is considered the last prominent ruler of this stronghold. Regional historians such as Shiv Prasad Dabral and Harikrishna Raturi situate Kaffu in the period of Panwar expansion under King Ajaypal, who sought to unify Garhwal during the 16th century.

== Conflict with the Panwars ==
According to historical summaries and oral tradition, Ajaypal demanded the submission of Uppu Garh. Kaffu Chauhan refused and declared his independence. In one of the most famous episodes preserved in folk memory, he destroyed a hanging bridge over the Alaknanda River to prevent Ajaypal's army from advancing.

Despite this resistance, Kaffu Chauhan was eventually defeated, and Uppu Garh was annexed by the Panwar kingdom.

== Folklore and oral traditions ==
Kaffu Chauhan's defiance and final battle became a subject of Garhwali folk songs and jagar performances. Folklore depicts him as a tragic hero who chose death over subjugation. Studies of Himalayan folk culture note his story alongside other legendary figures celebrated in oral narratives.

== Literary and cultural references ==
Kaffu Chauhan appears in regional literature, including poems and folk plays. He is mentioned in compilations such as Uttaranchal: Historical and Cultural Perspectives and Him-Kanti: Archaeology, Art, and History as an example of a regional folk hero.

Plays and radio adaptations such as those in the Akashvani Hindi series have dramatized his refusal to submit and his heroic fall. Folklore compilations like Folk Songs and Ballads of Garhwal also preserve songs dedicated to him.

== Legacy ==
Kaffu Chauhan is remembered in Garhwal as a symbol of pride and resistance. Oral tradition continues to celebrate his deeds, and local historians highlight him as an example of the small Garhpatis who resisted central authority before the unification of Garhwal.

== See also ==
- Garhwali people
- Medieval India
