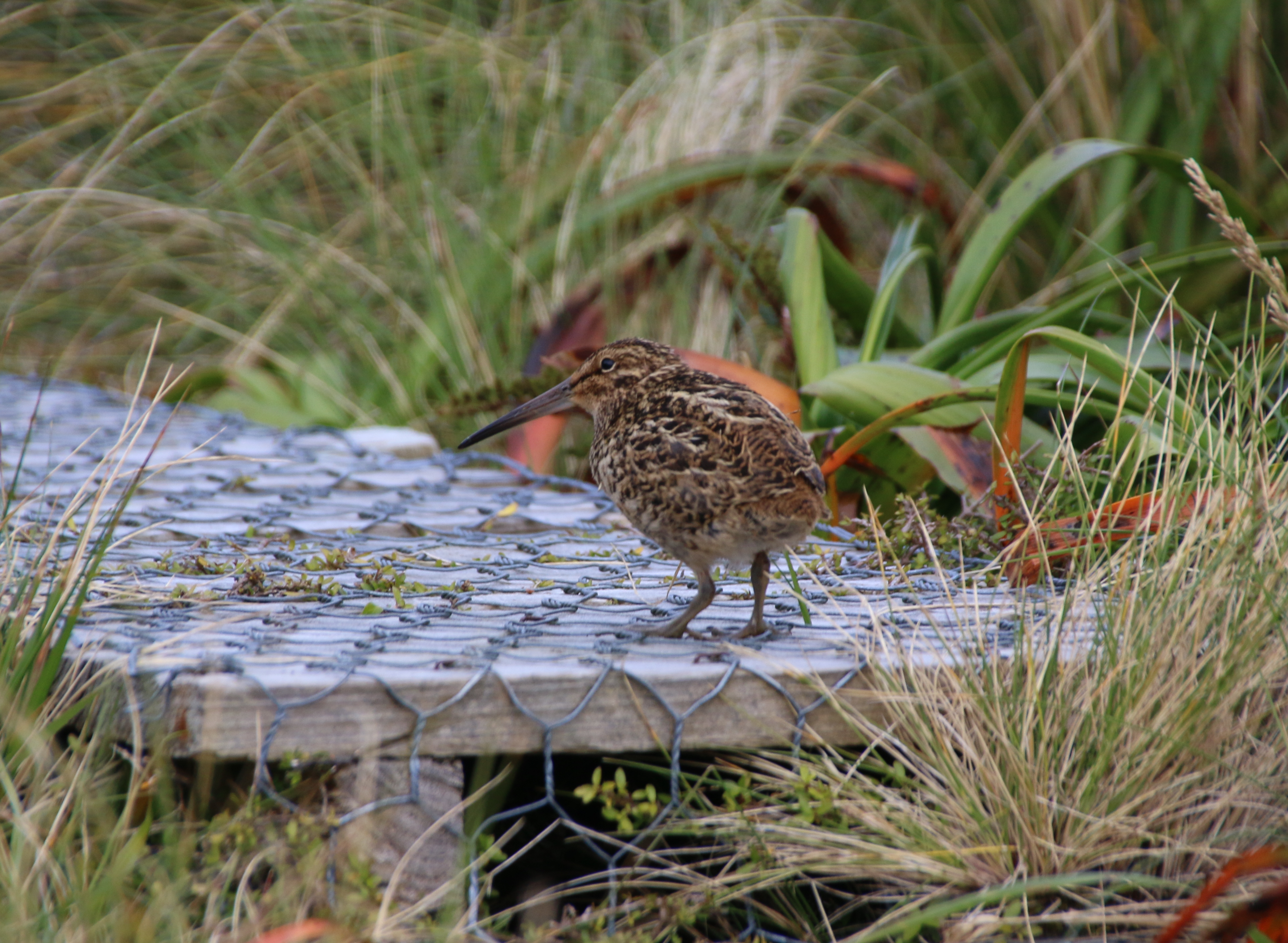
- Campbell snipe

Scientific classification
- Kingdom: Animalia
- Phylum: Chordata
- Class: Aves
- Order: Charadriiformes
- Family: Scolopacidae
- Genus: Coenocorypha; G.R. Gray, 1855

Type species
- Gallinago aucklandica G.R. Gray, 1845

Species
- see text

= Austral snipe =

Austral snipes

Genus of birds

The austral snipes, also known as the New Zealand snipes or tutukiwi, are a genus, Coenocorypha, of tiny birds in the sandpiper family, which are now only found on New Zealand's outlying islands. There are currently three living species and six known extinct species, with the Subantarctic snipe having three subspecies, including the Campbell Island snipe discovered as recently as 1997. The genus was once distributed from Fiji, New Caledonia and Norfolk Island, across New Zealand and southwards into New Zealand's subantarctic islands, but predation by introduced species, especially rats, has drastically reduced their range.

== Taxonomy and range ==
The relationship between Coenocorypha snipe and the snipes of the genus Gallinago is uncertain. Coenocorypha is sometimes thought to be a relict taxon of an ancient lineage; however, insufficient research has been done to prove this. The first specimen was collected from the Auckland Islands during the voyage of HMS Erebus and HMS Terror and was described by George Gray in 1845. Ten years later he assigned the species to its own genus. With the exception of the Chatham snipe and the Forbes's snipe (described from fossils found in the Chatham Islands) all subsequent New Zealand snipe collected were assigned as subspecies to the original species, known as the New Zealand snipe. Subspecific forms have been described from the Snares, Little Barrier Island, Stewart Island, the Antipodes Islands and Campbell Island.

A morphological study and comparisons of plumage and behaviour led some authors to accept that the Snares Islands, Little Barrier Island and Stewart Island forms were all species instead of subspecies of the Auckland Island snipe, also raising the possibility that the Antipodes Island snipe might be a separate species.

In 1997, a previously unknown form of snipe was discovered on Jacquemart Island off Campbell Island. The Campbell snipe was described as another subspecies in the radiation of New Zealand snipes. Fossil remains of Coenocorypha have also now been discovered on the islands of New Caledonia, Fiji and Norfolk Island. Fossil evidence has also shown that the Little Barrier Island form was once widespread across North Island and the Stewart Island form across South Island; both are now extinct.

=== Species and subspecies ===
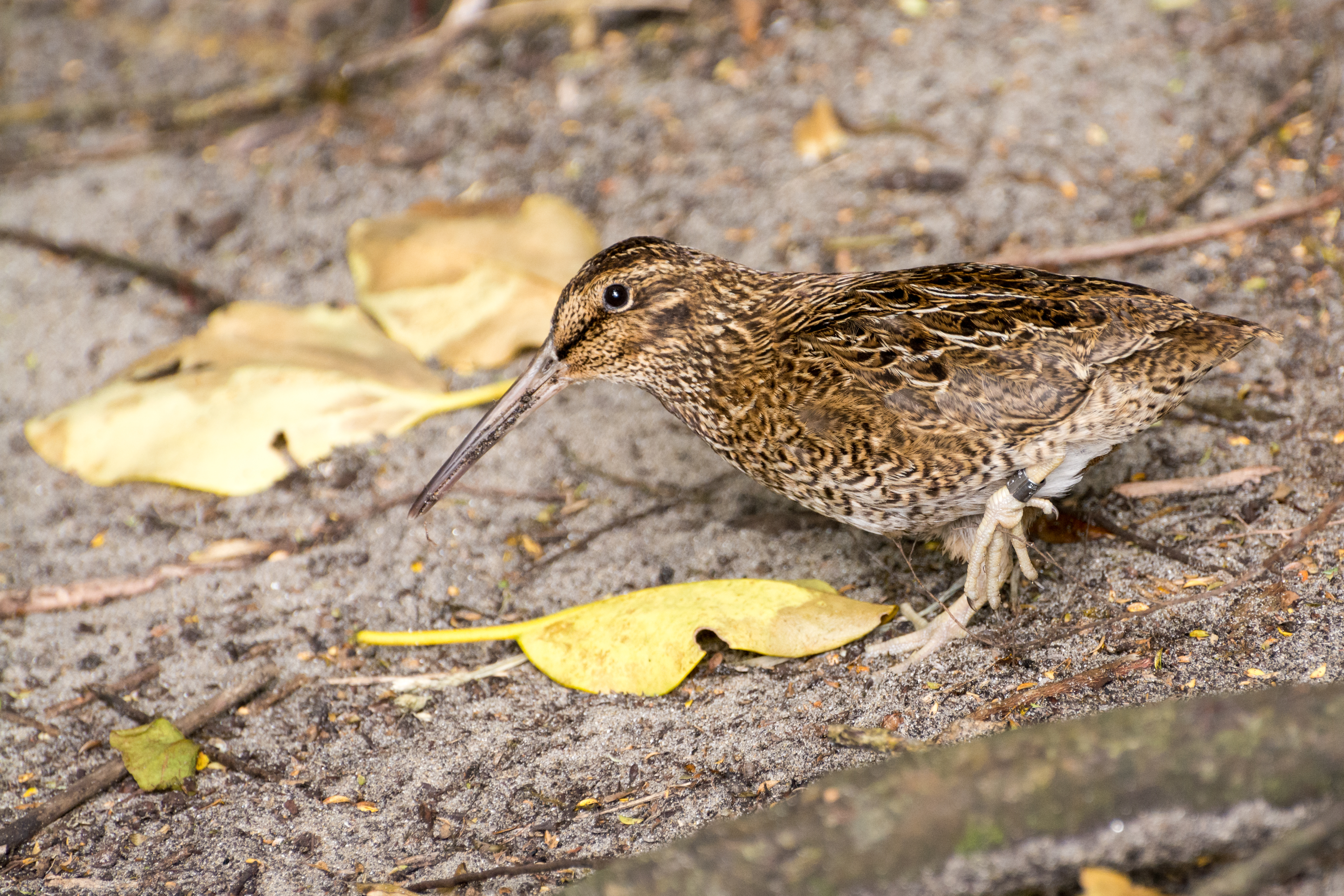
A banded adult Snares snipe, from the first translocation from the Snares Islands to Codfish Island / Whenua Hou.

- Chatham snipe C. pusilla (Buller, 1869) – Chatham Islands
- Subantarctic snipe C. aucklandica (G.R.Gray, 1845)
  - Auckland snipe C. a. aucklandica (G.R.Gray, 1845) – Auckland Islands
  - Antipodes snipe C. a. meinertzhagenae Rothschild, 1927 – Antipodes Islands
  - Campbell snipe C. a. perseverance Miskelly & Baker, 2010 – Campbell Island
- Snares snipe C. huegeli (Tristram, 1893) – Snares Islands
- † North Island snipe C. barrierensis Oliver, 1955, also known as the Little Barrier Snipe
- † South Island snipe C. iredalei Rothschild, 1921, also known as the Stewart Island Snipe
- † Forbes's snipe C. chathamica (Forbes, 1893) – Chatham Islands
- † Viti Levu snipe C. miratropica Worthy, 2003 – Fiji
- † New Caledonian snipe Coenocorypha neocaledonica Worthy et al., 2013 – New Caledonia
- † Norfolk snipe Coenocorypha sp. – Norfolk Island

== Description ==
The austral snipes have long bills and short necks, wings, and tails. Overall they resemble Gallinago snipes, although smaller, stockier, and with relatively shorter bills. They measure from 19–24 cm long, with wingspans of 28–35 cm, and weigh 75–120 g. The smallest species is the Chatham Island snipe. Their plumage is overall brown; most species have a dark eye stripe. The scapulars on the wings are mottled, with some species having white tips.

== Behaviour ==
=== Diet ===
The austral snipes are carnivorous, feeding on invertebrates found by probing in the soil and in compacted vegetation. Feeding is both diurnal and nocturnal, with most hunting occurring at night and in the early morning. Bouts of feeding are characterised by continuous probing the soil with the full length of the bill. The ground is covered systematically, with about 18 holes for every 100 cm^{2} of soil. Prey is presumably detected by touch and possibly by Herbst's corpuscles, clusters of cells that can detect changes in pressure and have been shown to be used by other shorebirds to detect prey. Smaller prey is swallowed with the bill still probed, as the mandibles are flexible and the prey can be manipulated in the soil. Larger prey items are removed from the soil for easier manipulating and swallowing. The most common prey items taken include earthworms, amphipods, beetle adults and larvae and the pupae of other insects.

=== Breeding ===
The breeding biology of some of the austral snipes has been studied in some detail. They are mostly monogamous (although occasionally some males attempt polygamy) and defend territories from other breeding pairs, although non-breeders are tolerated inside territories. Pair formation occurs some months before breeding, and males feed females as part of the courting rituals. Before breeding the male snipe also perform nocturnal aerial "hakawai" displays with calls followed by a non-vocal roar created by diving birds driving fast moving air across the rectrices of the tail. This display is thought to be the origin of the Māori legends about the Hakawai, a term which has been extended to refer to the aerial displays.

Both sexes choose the nesting site, although only the female builds the nest. The usual clutch size is two eggs, laid three days apart. Incubation duties are shared between the sexes, incubation taking 22 days. Where a male has two females in its territory it will incubate at just one nest, the female at the other has to incubate alone, taking 38 days to hatch chicks.

After hatching the pair splits, with each member of the pair taking one chick and raising it. Chicks are fed for around 41 days, and stay with the parent for another 20 days after that. The chick of the Chatham Island snipe matures faster than the other species, is only fed for thirty days and becomes independent at 41 days. Parental care in the extinct South Island snipe is also thought to have been different, with studies conducted in 1923 and 1930 showing that both parents cared for a single chick. Nothing is known about the parental care of the North Island snipe, the Forbes's snipe or the snipes of Fiji, New Caledonia or Norfolk Island.

== Threats and conservation ==
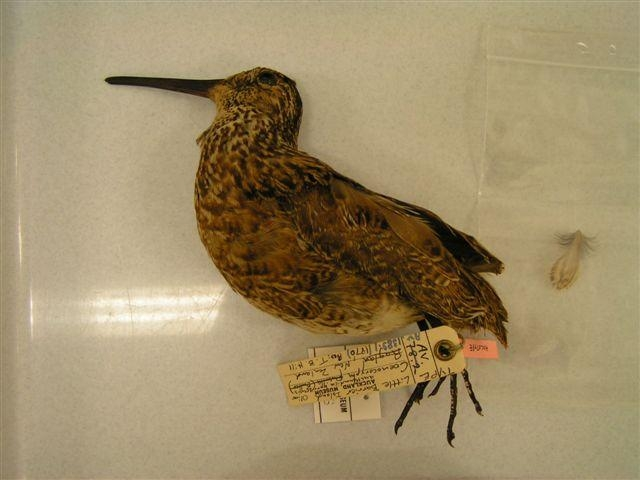
The extinct North Island snipe

The austral snipes evolved on oceanic islands without land mammals and were ecologically naive with regard to mammalian predators. When humans arrived on the islands they lived on they brought with them Polynesian rats and later larger more aggressive predators such as black rats, stoats and feral cats. With the arrival of these predators austral snipes quickly became extinct, with the species in Fiji, New Caledonia and Norfolk Island becoming extinct in prehistory. Around New Zealand snipes survived on rarely visited offshore islands and on the sub-Antarctic islands. The North Island snipe survived until the arrival of European settlers, and the last South Island snipe survived off Stewart Island / Rakiura until 1964, when rats reached Taukihepa / Big South Cape Island. The island had also been the last refuge of the bush wren and the New Zealand greater short-tailed bat. Attempts were made to capture some snipe (and wrens) for translocation to a safe island, but only two snipe were caught and both died two days later.

Today the remaining species are a conservation priority. Techniques to translocate snipe without killing them have been developed, and a small group of Snares Island snipe have been established off Stewart Island. Campbell Island snipe have benefited from the removal of rats from Campbell Island in 2001; they have recolonised the main island from Jacquemart Island and begun breeding there again.
