= Folk memory =

Past events passed down orally

Folk memory, also known as folklore or myths, refers to past events that have been passed orally from generation to generation. The events described by the memories may date back hundreds, thousands, or even tens of thousands of years and often have local significance. They may explain physical features in the local environment, provide reasons for cultural traditions or give etymologies for the names of local places.

== Alleged folk memories ==
=== Events ===
- Landing at Cape York by Willem Janszoon, the first European to see the coast of Australia, 1606.
- Myths from Native American and First nations groups about the 1700 Cascadia earthquake.
- The Origin of Fire in the Finnish national epic Kalevala, possibly originating to the meteorite impact resulting in Kaali crater in Estonia 4,000 – 7,600 years ago.
- Various Great Flood myths, possibly reflecting a flooding of the Black Sea basin c. 5600 BCE
- The Klamath Native American myth concerning the eruption of Mount Mazama c. 5700 BCE
- The movement of the stars in the star cluster Pleiades, visually changing from seven stars to six stars.

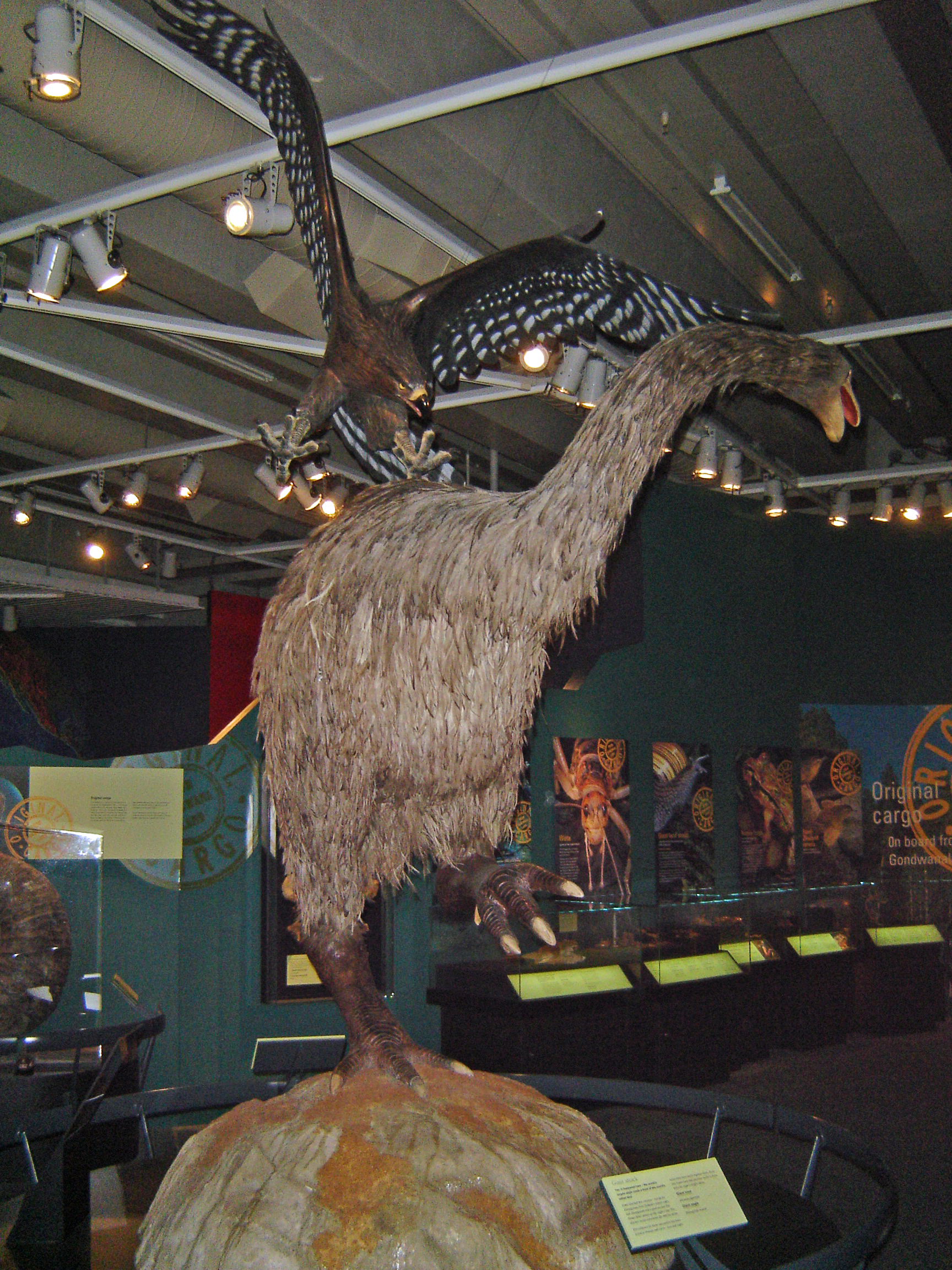
A model of the Haast's eagle attacking a moa with its large talons. The Haast's eagle is believed to be the subject of many Māori legends

=== Species ===
- Māori legends of a man-eating bird, known variously as the Pouākai, Hokioi, or Hakawai are commonly believed to recount Haast's eagle, a giant predatory bird that became extinct with the moa only 600 years ago. Opposing claims have been made that associate the Hokioi and Hakawai with the extirpated Coenocorypha snipe.
- Legends of the "Mapinguari" in the Amazon rainforest, a ground sloth-like creature tentatively identified with a mylodontid.
- Legends of the bunyip within Australian Aboriginal mythology have been associated with extinct marsupial megafauna such as Zygomaturus or Palorchestes. When shown fossil remains, some Aboriginal peoples identified them as those of the bunyip.
- Descriptions of the mihirung paringmal among Western Victorian Aboriginal peoples correspond to the extinct giant birds the Dromornithidae.
- A Noongar Aboriginal story from Perth, Western Australia, has been interpreted as referring to the extinct giant monitor lizard Megalania.
- Legends throughout Eurasia describing creatures such as the unicorn may have been based upon Elasmotherium, a rhinoceros believed to have been extinct for up to 50,000 years.
- The Ebu Gogo myths of the people of Flores have been hypothesised to represent Homo floresiensis, which perhaps became extinct around 10,000 BCE (although the Flores Islanders hold that the Ebu Gogo remained alive 400 years ago).
- An Inuit string figure representing a large creature is identified with the extinct woolly mammoth
- Legends from dozens of Native American tribes have been interpreted by some as indicative of Woolly Mammoth. One example is from the Kaska tribe from northern British Columbia; in 1917 an ethnologist recorded their tradition of: “A very large kind of animal which roamed the country a long time ago. It corresponded somewhat to white men's pictures of elephants. It was of huge size, in build like an elephant, had tusks, and was hairy. These animals were seen not so very long ago, it is said, generally singly, but none have been seen now for several generations. Indians come across their bones occasionally. The narrator said he and some others, a few years ago, came on a shoulder-blade... as wide as a table (about three feet).” However, the animal in this story was predatory and carnivorous, suggesting the memory of the proboscideans had become conflated with that of other megafauna, such as bears and sabertooths.

== See also ==
- Cultural memory
- Euhemerism
- Cryptozoology
