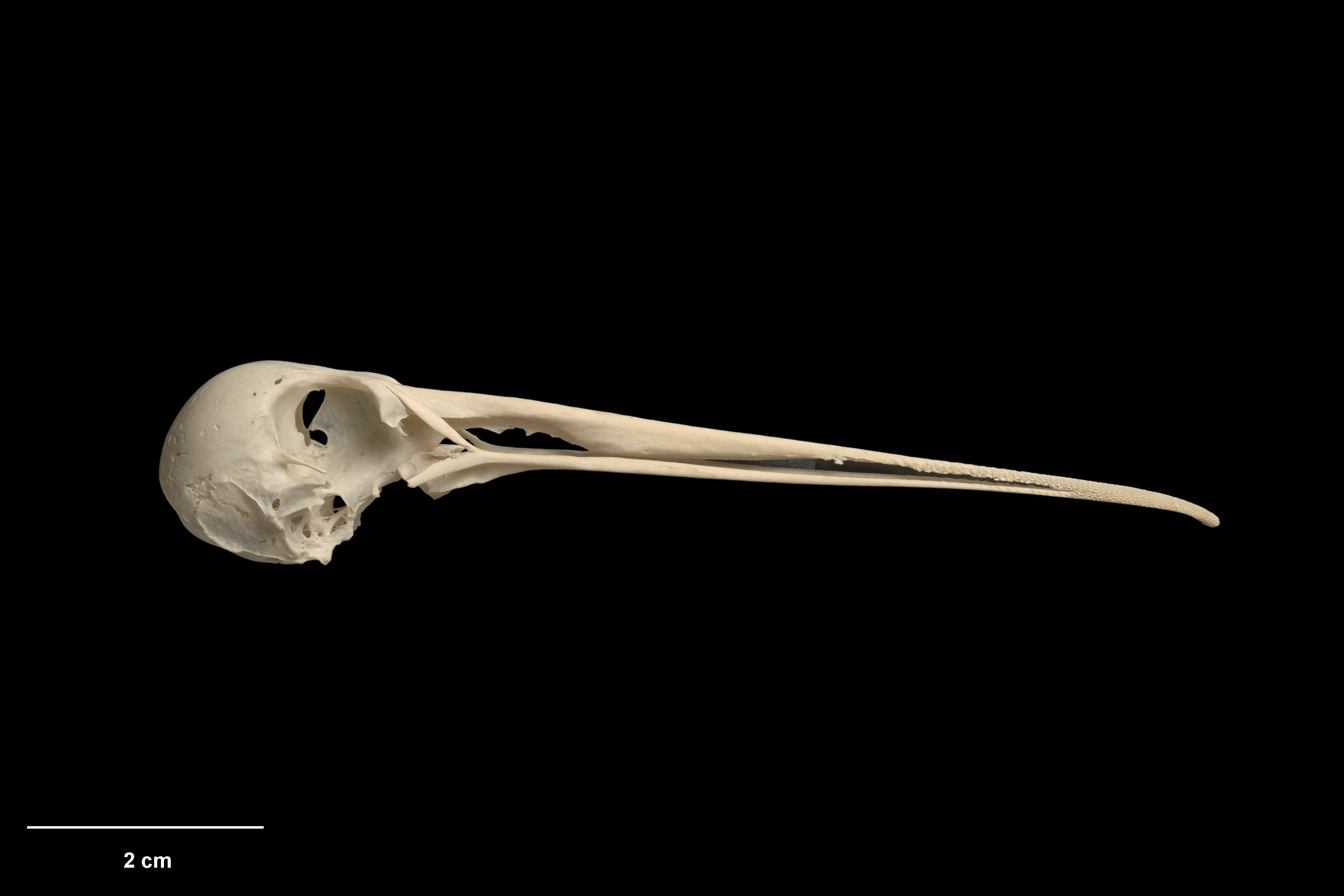
- Type specimen from the collections of Te Papa

Conservation status
- Extinct

Scientific classification
- Domain: Eukaryota
- Kingdom: Animalia
- Phylum: Chordata
- Class: Aves
- Order: Charadriiformes
- Family: Scolopacidae
- Genus: Coenocorypha
- Species: †C. chathamica

Binomial name
- †Coenocorypha chathamica (Forbes, 1893)

= Forbes's snipe =

Forbes's snipe Temporal range: Holocene

Extinct species of bird

Forbes's snipe (Coenocorypha chathamica) is an extinct species of New Zealand snipe formerly endemic to the Chatham Islands. It was the larger of two species found there, the smaller being the surviving Chatham snipe. It was never seen alive by scientists and is known only from fossil material collected on the islands. Why it became extinct while its smaller relative survived is a mystery, as is the exact timing of its extinction, although it may have survived, unnoticed, until the 15th century.
