= New Caledonian snipe =

New Caledonian snipe Temporal range: Holocene

Scientific classification
- Kingdom: Animalia
- Phylum: Chordata
- Class: Aves
- Order: Charadriiformes
- Family: Scolopacidae
- Genus: Coenocorypha
- Species: C. neocaledonica

Binomial name
- Coenocorypha neocaledonica Worthy, Anderson & Sand, 2013

Extinct species of bird

The New Caledonian snipe (Coenocorypha neocaledonica) is an extinct species of austral snipe, described from late Holocene cave deposits on the French island of New Caledonia in the western Pacific Ocean. The specific epithet is a latinisation of the name of its island home.

== Description ==
Although austral snipe are small birds, the endemic New Caledonian form was larger than all its congeners, with the exception of the Viti Levu snipe (C. miratropica). Examination of its wing bones suggest that it was a relatively strong flier.

== Extinction ==
The species became extinct within about 1000 years of human settlement of the island, probably as a result of predation by human introduced rats.
