= Putauhina Island =

Offshore island of New Zealand

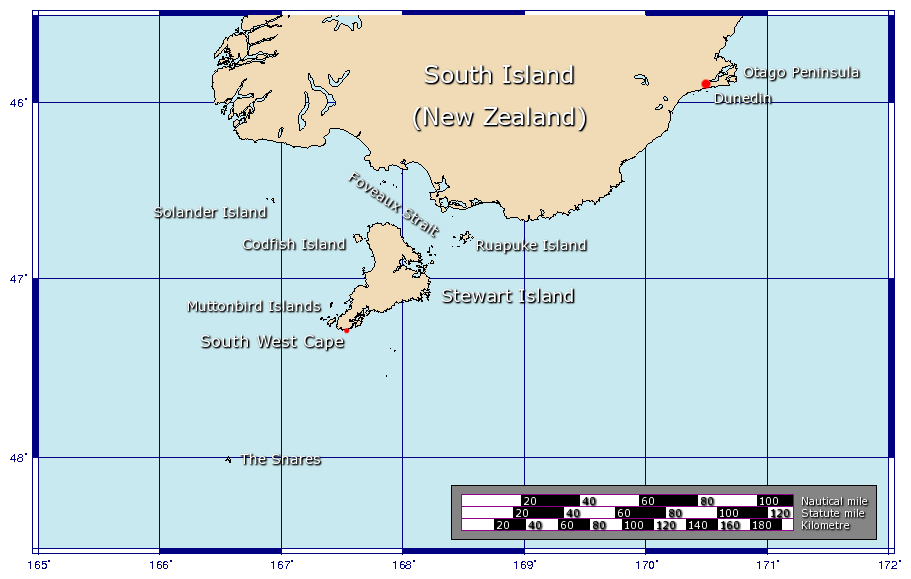

Geography
- Location: South Tasman Sea, southwest of Stewart Island
- Coordinates: 47°13′S 167°23′E
- Archipelago: New Zealand archipelago

Administration
- New Zealand
- Regional Council: Southland

Putauhina Island, also known as Putauhinu Island, is an offshore island of New Zealand to the west of the southern tip of Stewart Island / Rakiura. It lies very close to Big South Cape Island.

== Conservation ==
Translocations of South Island saddlebacks to Putauhinu Island occurred in 1974, 1976, and 1984. Thirty Snares Island snipe were translocated from the Snares Islands in 2005.

== See also ==
- Conservation in New Zealand
- List of islands of New Zealand
