= Curt Alfred Herbst =

- Born: Curt Alfred Herbst; 29 May 1866
- Died: 9 May 1946 (aged 79)

Curt Alfred Herbst (29 May 1866 – 9 May 1946) was a German embryologist and zoologist who studied development of cells and tissues. He noted the mechanosensory organs now known as Herbst corpuscles in the bills of birds.

Herbst was born to Heinrich and Henriette Martin in Meuselwitz, Thuringia. He was educated in Geneva and Jena where his teachers included Carl Vogt and Ernst Haeckel. He also went to the Polytechnic in Zurich to study chemistry. He studied echinoderm larvae and noted the effect of lithium ion gradients on morphogenesis and noted sex-determination in Bonellia viridis through environmental concentrations of ions. After obtaining a Ph.D. in 1889 he visited Southeast Asia along with Hans Driesch, visiting Ceylon, Java and the Trieste marine station. He then went to Heidelberg to study under Otto Bütschli and became an associate professor in 1906. He received an honorary doctorate from the University of Halle. His students included Helmuth Plessner.
