= Betsy Island (New Zealand) =

Island in New Zealand

Geography
- Location: Boat Group, Stewart Island
- Coordinates: 47.129977°S 167.537765°E

Administration
- New Zealand
- Region: Southland

Demographics
- Population: uninhabited

Betsy Island, or Return Island, or Temaka Island is an island in the Boat Group of islands on the south west of Stewart Island, New Zealand. It is north of Big Island, and south of Kundy Island.

== See also ==
- List of islands of New Zealand
