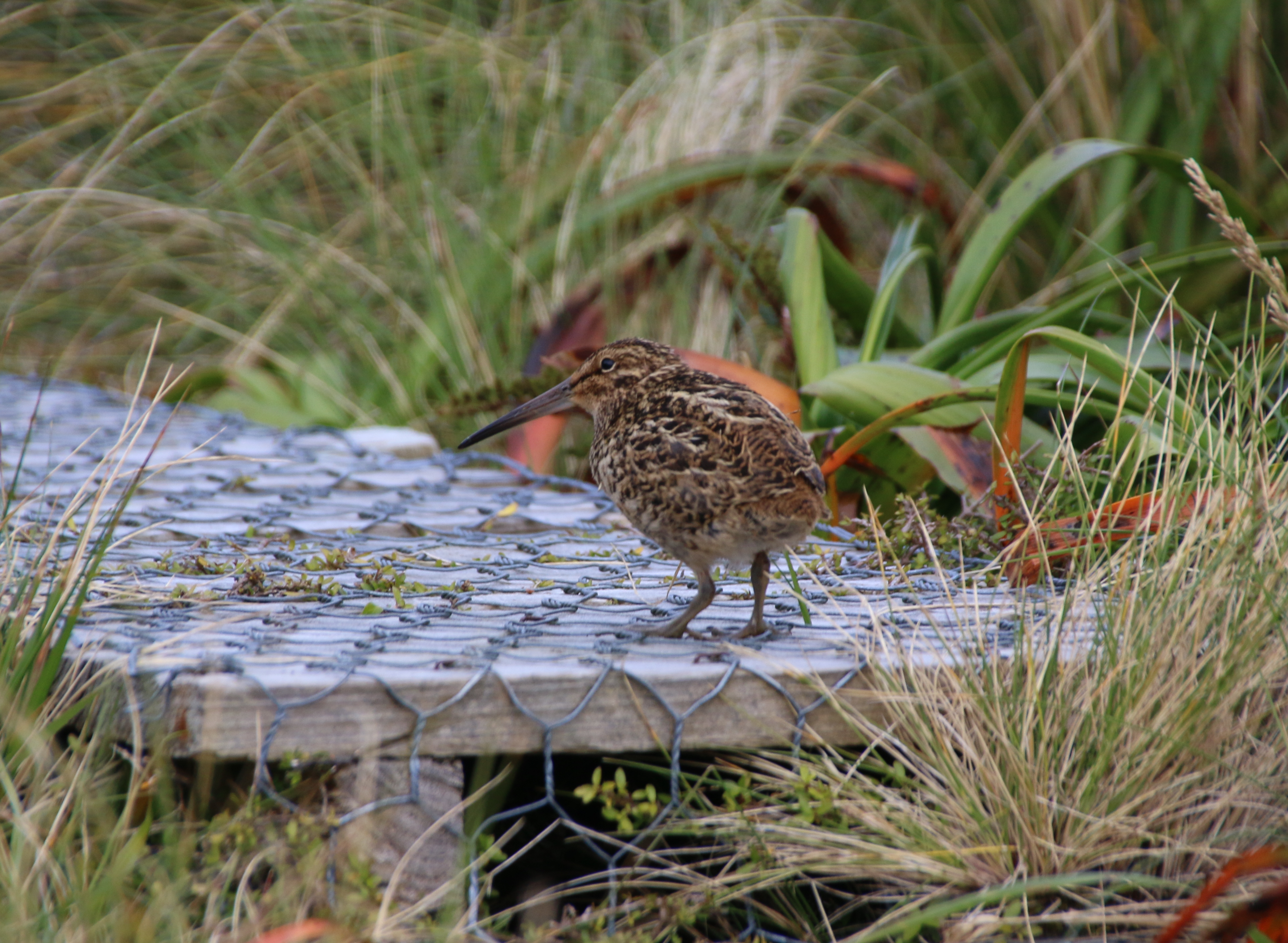
- Campbell snipe (Coenocorypha aucklandica perseverance)

Conservation status
- Near Threatened (IUCN 3.1)

Scientific classification
- Kingdom: Animalia
- Phylum: Chordata
- Class: Aves
- Order: Charadriiformes
- Family: Scolopacidae
- Genus: Coenocorypha
- Species: C. aucklandica

Binomial name
- Coenocorypha aucklandica (Gray, 1845)
- Distribution map of the Subantarctic snipe: Auckland snipe (C. a. aucklandica) Campbell snipe (C. a. perseverance) Antipodes snipe (C. a. meinertzhagenae)

Synonyms
- Gallinago aucklandica Gray, 1845

= Subantarctic snipe =

Species of bird

The Subantarctic snipe (Coenocorypha aucklandica), sometimes also Auckland snipe or New Zealand snipe, is a species of snipe endemic to New Zealand's subantarctic islands. The Maori call it "Tutukiwi". The nominate race C. a. aucklandica (Auckland snipe) is found on the Auckland Islands (excluding the main island). Other subspecies include C. a. meinertzhagenae (Antipodes snipe) from the Antipodes Islands, and C. a. perseverance (Campbell snipe) from Campbell Island / Motu Ihupuku. The former subspecies from the Snares Islands has been separated as a full species, the Snares snipe (C. huegeli), as have the extinct South Island (C. iredalei) and North Island snipes (C. barrierensis).

== Description ==
The Subantarctic snipe is a small wading bird with adults growing to about 23 cm (9 in) in length. It has cryptic brown plumage, sturdy legs and a slender beak about 5 cm (2 in) long. The head is striped in black and reddish brown and the body is brown, mottled with black and reddish brown.

== Distribution ==
The Subantarctic snipe is endemic to certain islands to the south of New Zealand. Each island or group of islands has its own subspecies. New Zealand formerly had two mainland species of snipe, but both of these are extinct. The South Island snipe (C. iredalei) became extinct on Jacky Lee Island when the flightless weka was introduced and on Taukihepa / Big South Cape Island (both the former and the latter muttonbird islands south of Stewart Island), its last refuge after black rats (Rattus rattus) arrived there in 1964. The last North Island Snipe (C. barrierensis) was seen in 1870 on Little Barrier Island. The Campbell Island Snipe (C. a. perseverance) were nearly extinguished but a few remained on an outlying islet and recolonised the main island when rats were exterminated there. A further two subspecies are the Antipodes snipe (C. a. meinertzhagenae) on the Antipodes Islands and the Auckland Island snipe (C. a. aucklandica) on the Auckland Islands. The Snares Island snipe (Coenocorypha huegeli) was formerly thought to be a subspecies of the Subantarctic snipe, but is now recognised as a separate species.

== Behaviour ==
The Subantarctic snipe seldom flies, is relatively tame and nests on the ground and this puts it at risk of predation by land-based predators. It favours areas of dense ground cover and feeds on a range of invertebrates. It has a characteristic courtship display which takes place at night when males make vertical dives from considerable heights. Nesting takes place at different dates between August and January on the different islands.
