= Boat Group =

Islands in New Zealand

Geography
- Coordinates: 47.133561°S 167.532333°E

Administration
- New Zealand
- Region: Southland

Demographics
- Population: uninhabited

Boat Group is a group of island to the west of Stewart Island, New Zealand. The group contains Big Island on the west, and Betsy Island on the east. It is one of the groups which together make up the Tītī / Muttonbird Islands.

== See also ==
- List of islands of New Zealand
