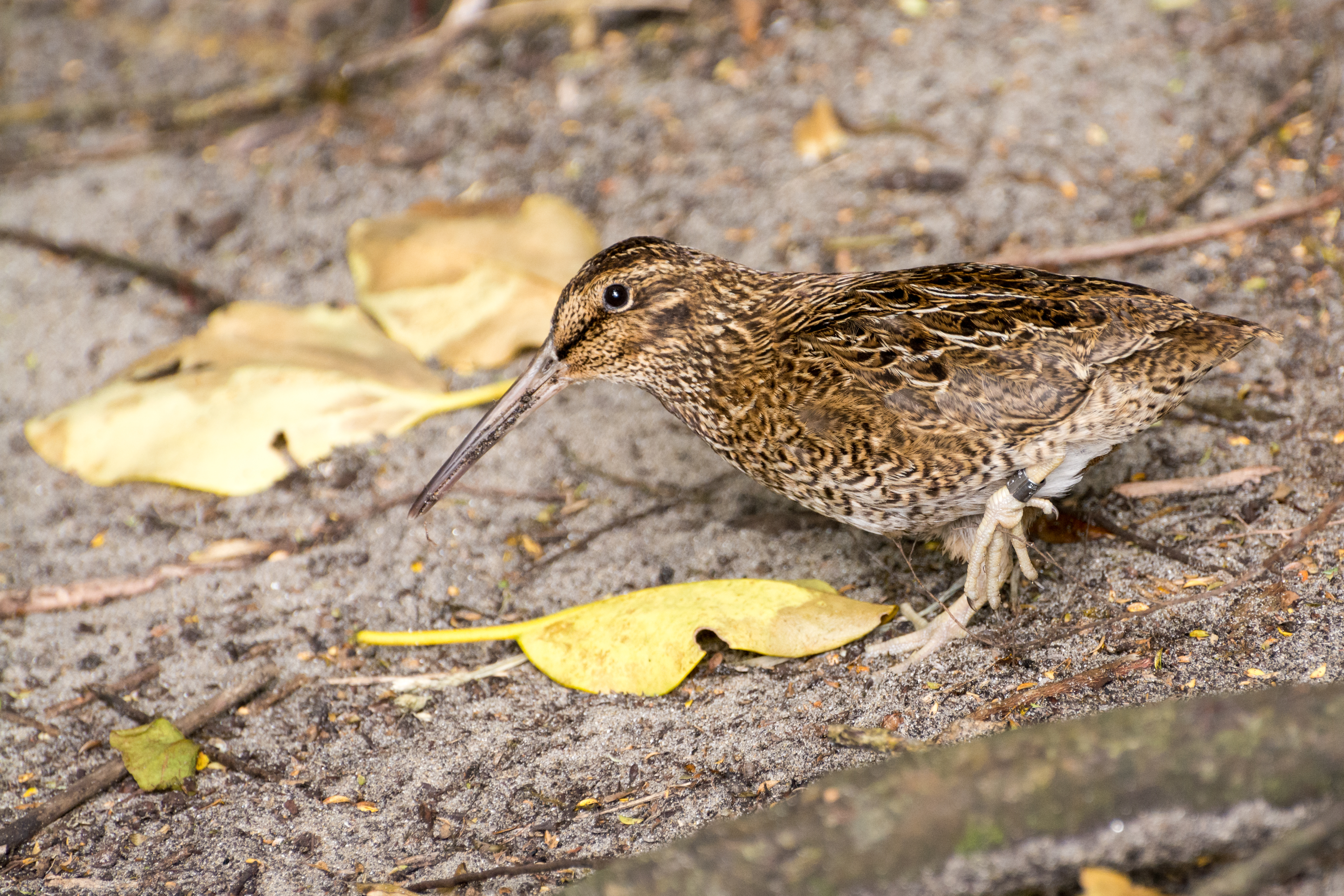
- A banded adult from the first translocation to Codfish Island / Whenua Hou from the Snares Islands.

Conservation status
- Near Threatened (IUCN 3.1)

Scientific classification
- Kingdom: Animalia
- Phylum: Chordata
- Class: Aves
- Order: Charadriiformes
- Family: Scolopacidae
- Genus: Coenocorypha
- Species: C. huegeli

Binomial name
- Coenocorypha huegeli (Tristram, 1893)

Synonyms
- Gallinago huegeli; Coenocorypha aucklandica huegeli

= Snares snipe =

Species of bird

The Snares snipe (Coenocorypha huegeli), also known as the Snares Island snipe, or tutukiwi in Māori, is a species of bird in the sandpiper family, Scolopacidae.

== Taxonomy and etymology ==
The Snares Island snipe is one of a group of birds of sometimes disputed relationships in the genus Coenocorypha. It was formerly considered to be a subspecies of the Subantarctic snipe (Coenocorypha aucklandica), but has since been elevated to a full species.

The taxon was first described by the Reverend Henry Baker Tristram as Gallinago huegeli, with the specific epithet honouring British and Austrian naturalist Anatole von Hügel who collected it. The Māori name, tutukiwi, which may be applied to other Coenocorypha snipes as well, alludes to the bird's fancied resemblance in appearance and behaviour to a miniature kiwi.

== Description ==
The snipe is a small, chunky, and cryptically patterned wader with bars, stripes, and spots in shades of brown ranging from buffy-white to nearly black. It has longitudinal stripes on the face and crown. The bird possesses a long bill, short neck, and tail. Its outer tail feathers are narrow and stiffened, which is a modification enabling the distinctive roaring sound of the nocturnal hakawai aerial display.

The snipe's sexes exhibit similar appearances, with females being slightly larger than males, weighing about 116 g compared to males' 101 g. The bill length of females is around 57 mm, while males have a length of 55 mm. Females have olive-colored legs instead of yellow, and their primary coverts have mottling on the inner edges, unlike males who lack such markings. Males also possess more strongly contrasting dorsal markings. Juveniles display duller coloration. While no single characteristic allows for definitive sexing of snipes, researchers on the Snares have identified that a combination of traits enables the assignment of birds to age and sex classes. Walter Oliver, in his book "New Zealand Birds" (1955), states, "The Snares Island snipe is distinguished by the under surface being barred all over which is not the case with any other subspecies. The general color also is more reddish than in the others."

== Distribution and habitat ==
The snipe is endemic to the Snares Islands, a small subantarctic island group, with a total surface area of 3.5 km ^{2}, some 200 km south of New Zealand in the Southern Ocean. There it breeds on North East and Broughton Islands, and has been recorded on Alert Stack. The species has also been introduced to Putauhinu Island. Its favoured habitat is the moist floor beneath Olearia and Brachyglottis forest, with a ground layer of grass tussocks, sedges, mat-forming herbs and Polystichum vestitum shield ferns.

== Behaviour ==
Edgar Stead reported on a visit to the Snares in December 1947 by saying of the snipe:

"When flushed in the daytime it runs for a few feet then stands still silently regarding the intruder. They are reluctant to fly during the daytime and when they do it is not for more than ten or fifteen yards and often for only two or three. At night they fly more readily and for considerable distances. Their food apparently consists chiefly of worms. Always snipe are to be found on the outskirts of penguin colonies. Their laying season commenced at the beginning of December. Nests were found in the heart of big tussocks of Poa foliosa about one foot above ground level. The nests were deep cups of fine grass 9 ½ cm wide by 7 cm deep, and contained a good deal of material."

=== Breeding ===
Most of the snipe breed in monogamous pairs, which hold breeding territories, with both parents sharing incubation duties of the two-egg clutch, in a nest concealed in dense ground vegetation. When the chicks hatch they weigh 14–18 g and are precocial and nidifugous; the male parent looks after the first chick to leave the nest, while the female takes care of the second. The chicks remain with their respective parents for about eight weeks, and are fed by them for the first two. They are capable of flight at about 30 days old.

=== Feeding ===
The snipe feed on a variety of small invertebrates, including annelids, amphipods, spiders and insects, obtained by probing with their long bills in the soil and leaf litter.

== Status and conservation ==
The total population of the species in the Snares is estimated at just over 400 pairs. On 16 April 2005 thirty snipe were translocated from North East Island in the Snares to 141 ha (350-acre) Putauhinu Island, in order to establish an insurance population against the possibility of the Snares being threatened by the accidental introduction of terrestrial predators. Putauhinu lies in the south-western chain of the Titi Islands, near Stewart Island. It lies 1.5 km west of Big South Cape Island, which was the final refuge for the now extinct South Island snipe (Coenocorypha iredalei). Snipes have also been translocated to Codfish Island / Whenua Hou.
