= Pouākai =

Giant bird in Māori mythology

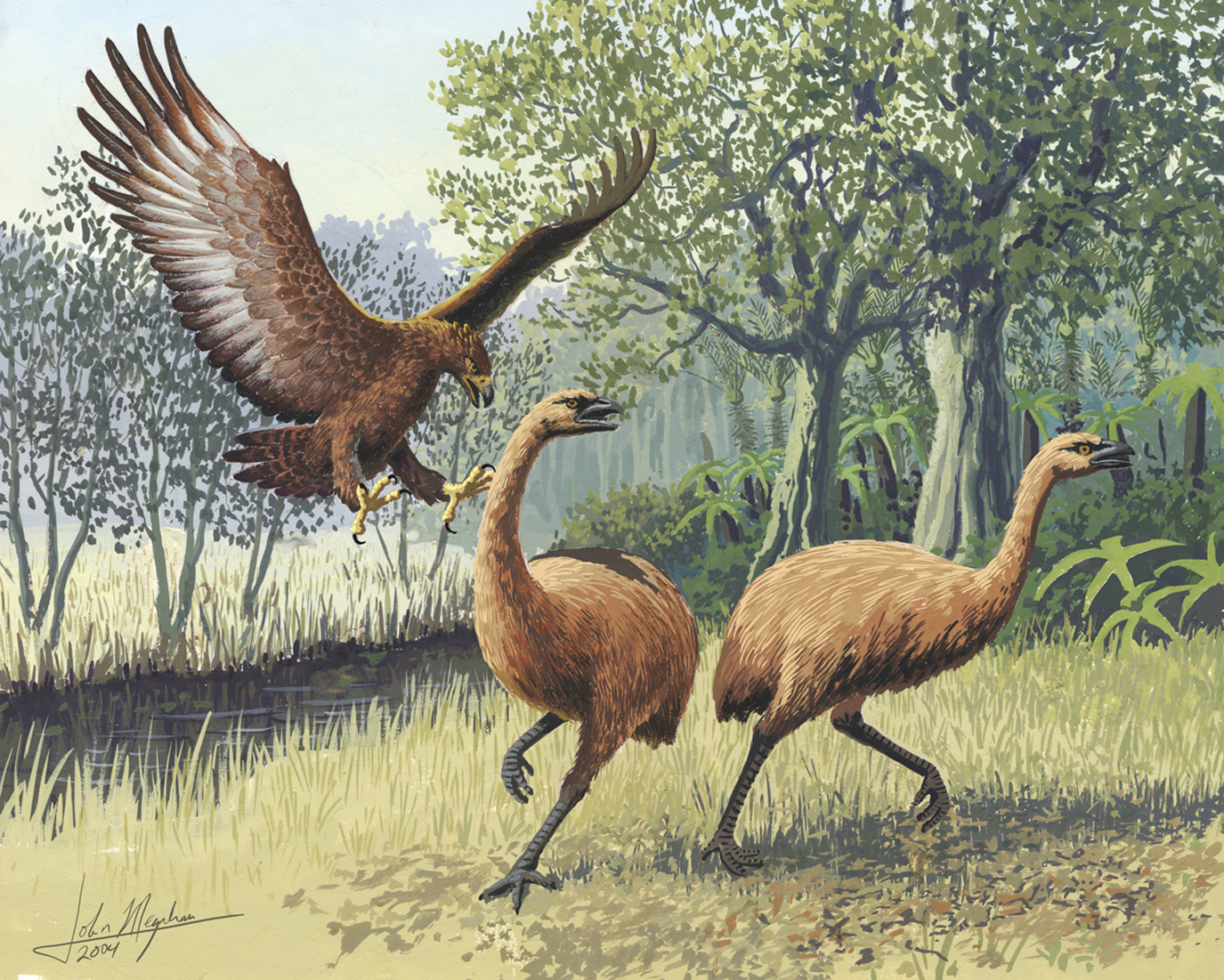
- The Haast's eagle, which may have inspired the Pouākai

Creature information
- Grouping: Birds of prey
- Sub grouping: Eagles
- Folklore: Māori

Origin
- Country: New Zealand
- Region: South Island

The pouākai (also spelled poukai) is a monstrous bird in Māori mythology.

== Mythologies ==
In some of these legends, the Pouākai kills and eats humans. The myth may refer to the real but now extinct Haast's eagle: the largest known eagle species, which was able to kill an adult moa weighing up to 230 kilograms (510 lb), and which potentially had the capability to kill a person.

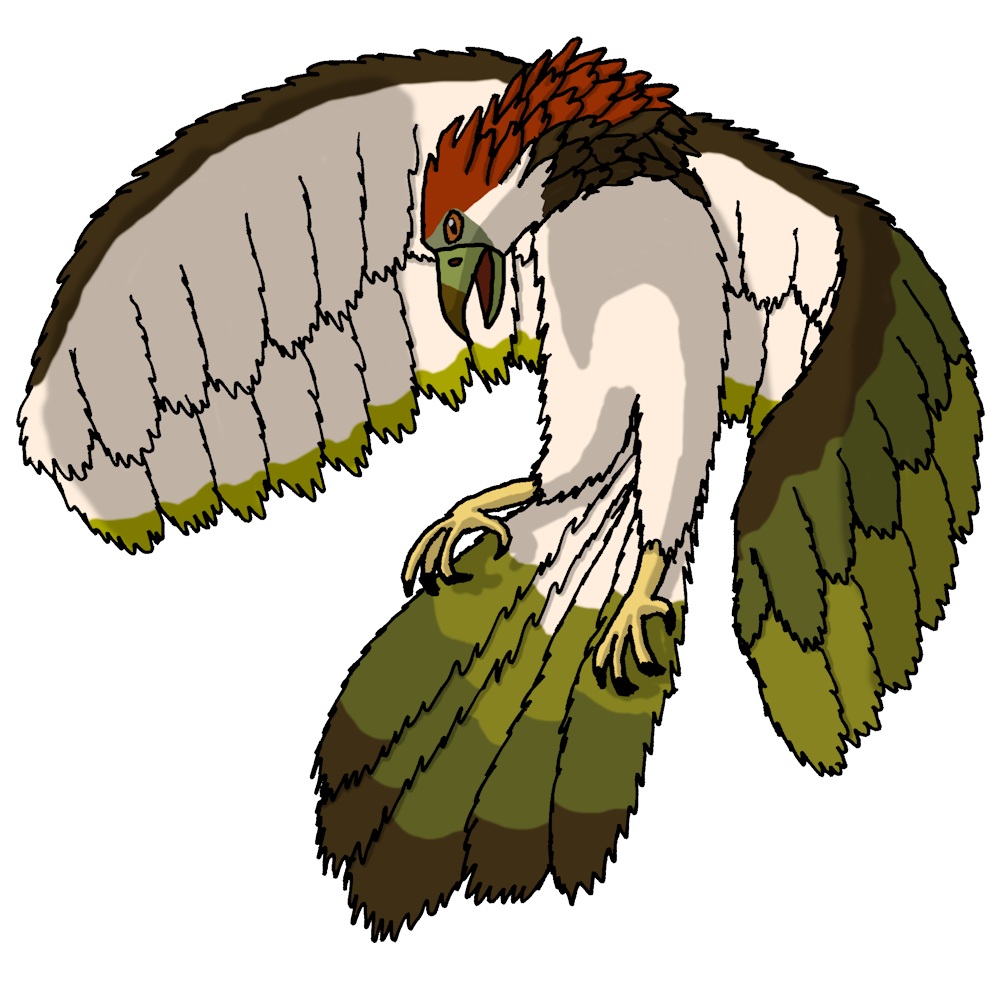
Artist's depiction of a Pouākai

== History ==
Haast's eagles, which lived only in the east and northwest of New Zealand's South Island, did not become extinct until around two hundred years after the arrival of Māori. Eagles are depicted in early rock-shelter paintings in South Canterbury. Large amounts of the eagle's lowland habitat had been destroyed by burning by AD 1350, and it was driven extinct by overhunting, both directly (Haast's eagle bones have been found in Māori archaeological sites) and indirectly: its main prey species, nine species of moa and other large birds such as adzebills, flightless ducks, and flightless geese, were hunted to extinction at the same time.

== See also ==
- Hakawai
- Folk memory
