= Tītī / Muttonbird Islands =

Small uninhabited archipelago off New Zealand

Muttonbird Islands
Native name: Motu Tītī
- Interactive map of Muttonbird Islands

Administration
- New Zealand

Demographics
- Population: Seasonally inhabited; no permanent population
- Ethnic groups: Rakiura Māori

The Tītī / Muttonbird Islands are an island group near Stewart Island in the far south of New Zealand. The islands are not permanently inhabited, and are named for the traditional seasonal harvesting ("muttonbirding") of the sooty shearwater by Māori. These birds are known as "muttonbirds" due to their supposedly mutton-like taste.

== History ==
In May 2006, the north-eastern chain was the scene of tragedy when the fishing boat Kotuku capsized with the loss of six lives, close to Women's Island.

== Description ==
The islands are clustered in three chains, collectively referred to as the Muttonbird or Tītī Islands. The island group's official name is Tītī / Muttonbird Islands. The north-eastern chain lies in Foveaux Strait, to the north-east of Stewart Island, between it and Ruapuke Island. A small eastern chain, south of Stewart Island's east cape, also goes by the name of the Breaksea Islands. The southern chain lies to the south-west of Stewart Island.

=== Islands ===
==== North-eastern chain ====
North, Women's, Edwards, Jacky Lee, Herekopare and Kanetetoe Islands, The Bunker Islets, and Fish Rock. The Bunker Islets were named after Eber Bunker who surveyed the Foveaux Strait in 1808.

==== Eastern chain ====
Rakawahakura, Takawini, Potuatua, Pomatakiarehua, Kaihuka and Wharepuaitaha Islands.

==== Southern, or south-western, chain ====
Four distinct groups of islands make up the south-western chain. Close to Stewart Island's south-westernmost point is Taukihepa / Big South Cape Island, close to which lie Poutama, Putauhina, Solomon, Kaimohu, Pukaparara, Tamaitemioka and Pohowaitai Islands and the Putauhina Nuggets. In the open sea 8 km to the north lie Big Moggy, Little Moggy and Mokinui Islands. To the east of these, close to Stewart Island, the Boat Group consists of Big, Kundy, Betsy and Rat Islands. To the south of these lie the small rocky islets of The Brothers. The southern Muttonbird Islands have been identified as an Important Bird Area by BirdLife International because of their significance as a breeding site for sooty shearwaters, with over a million breeding pairs, and mottled petrels.

== See also ==
- List of islands of New Zealand
- List of islands
- Desert island
