= Big Island (New Zealand) =

Island in New Zealand

Te Poho-o-Tairea (Māori)

Geography
- Location: Boat Group, Stewart Island
- Coordinates: 47.137419°S 167.524004°E

Administration
- New Zealand
- Region: Southland

Demographics
- Population: uninhabited

Big Island, or Stage Island, or Te Poho-o-Tairea is an island to the west of Stewart Island, New Zealand. It is part of the Boat Group of the Tītī / Muttonbird Islands.

== See also ==
- List of islands of New Zealand
