= Viti Levu snipe =

Viti Levu snipe Temporal range: Late Holocene

Conservation status
- Extinct

Scientific classification
- Kingdom: Animalia
- Phylum: Chordata
- Class: Aves
- Order: Charadriiformes
- Family: Scolopacidae
- Genus: Coenocorypha
- Species: †C. miratropica

Binomial name
- †Coenocorypha miratropica Worthy, 2003

Extinct species of bird

The Viti Levu snipe (Coenocorypha miratropica) is an extinct species of austral snipe endemic to Fiji. A species of the mostly New Zealand genus Coenocorypha, it became extinct after the arrival of humans in Fiji.
