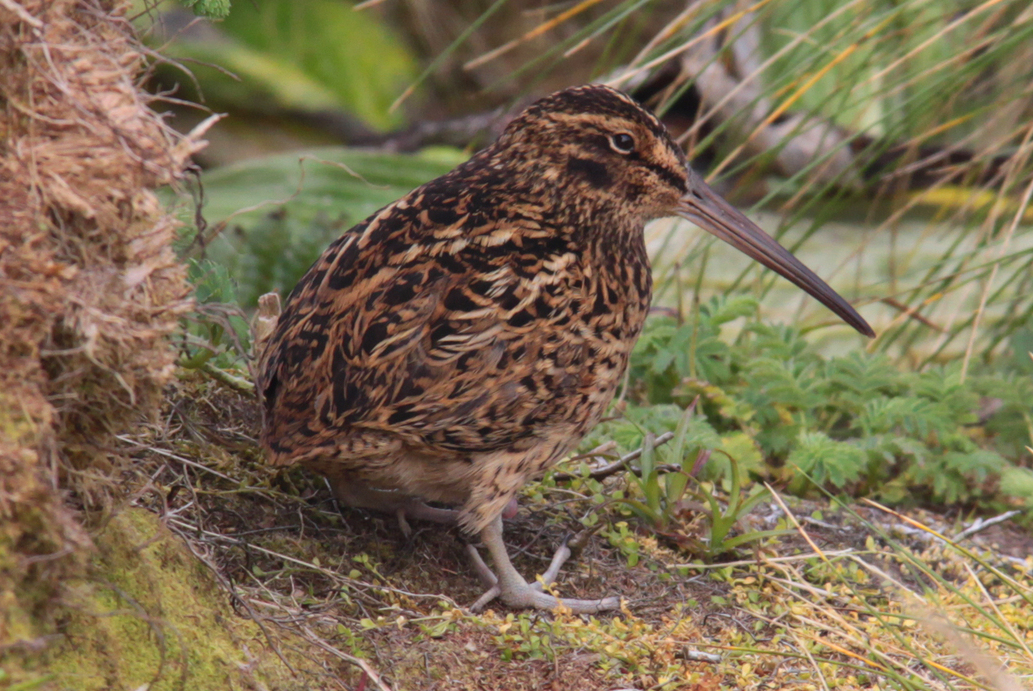

Scientific classification
- Domain: Eukaryota
- Kingdom: Animalia
- Phylum: Chordata
- Class: Aves
- Order: Charadriiformes
- Family: Scolopacidae
- Genus: Coenocorypha
- Species: C. aucklandica
- Subspecies: C. a. meinertzhagenae

Trinomial name
- Coenocorypha aucklandica meinertzhagenae Rothschild, 1927
- Native range

Synonyms
- Gallinago tristrami; Coenocorypha meinertzhagenae

= Antipodes snipe =

Antipodes Island snipe

Subspecies of bird

The Antipodes snipe (Coenocorypha aucklandica meinertzhagenae), also known as the Antipodes Island snipe, is an isolated subspecies of the Subantarctic snipe that is endemic to the Antipodes Islands, a subantarctic island group south of New Zealand in the Southern Ocean.

== Taxonomy and etymology ==
The Antipodes Island snipe was first collected by Fairchild in 1887, and by Andreas Reischek in 1888. It was first described by Walter Rothschild in 1893 as Gallinago tristrami in honour of Henry Baker Tristram. However, doubts were raised about the provenance of the type specimen, which appeared to be from the Auckland Islands, and Rothschild made a new description in 1927, recognising the Antipodes Island form as a subspecies of Coenocorypha aucklandica. The subspecific name honours British ornithologist Annie Meinertzhagen, the second wife of ornithologist Richard Meinertzhagen.

== Description ==
The Antipodes Island snipe is similar to the nominate subspecies – the Auckland Island snipe – but differs in being darker above and with yellower underparts.

== Distribution and habitat ==
The snipe is endemic to the Antipodes group, which has a total surface area of 22 km^{2} (8.5 sq mi). It has been recorded not only from the main Antipodes Island, but also from the much smaller Bollons, Archway and Inner Windward Islands. It inhabits the islands’ tussock grasslands and herbfields, nesting under tussocks and Polystichum vestitum shield ferns.

== Behaviour ==
=== Breeding ===
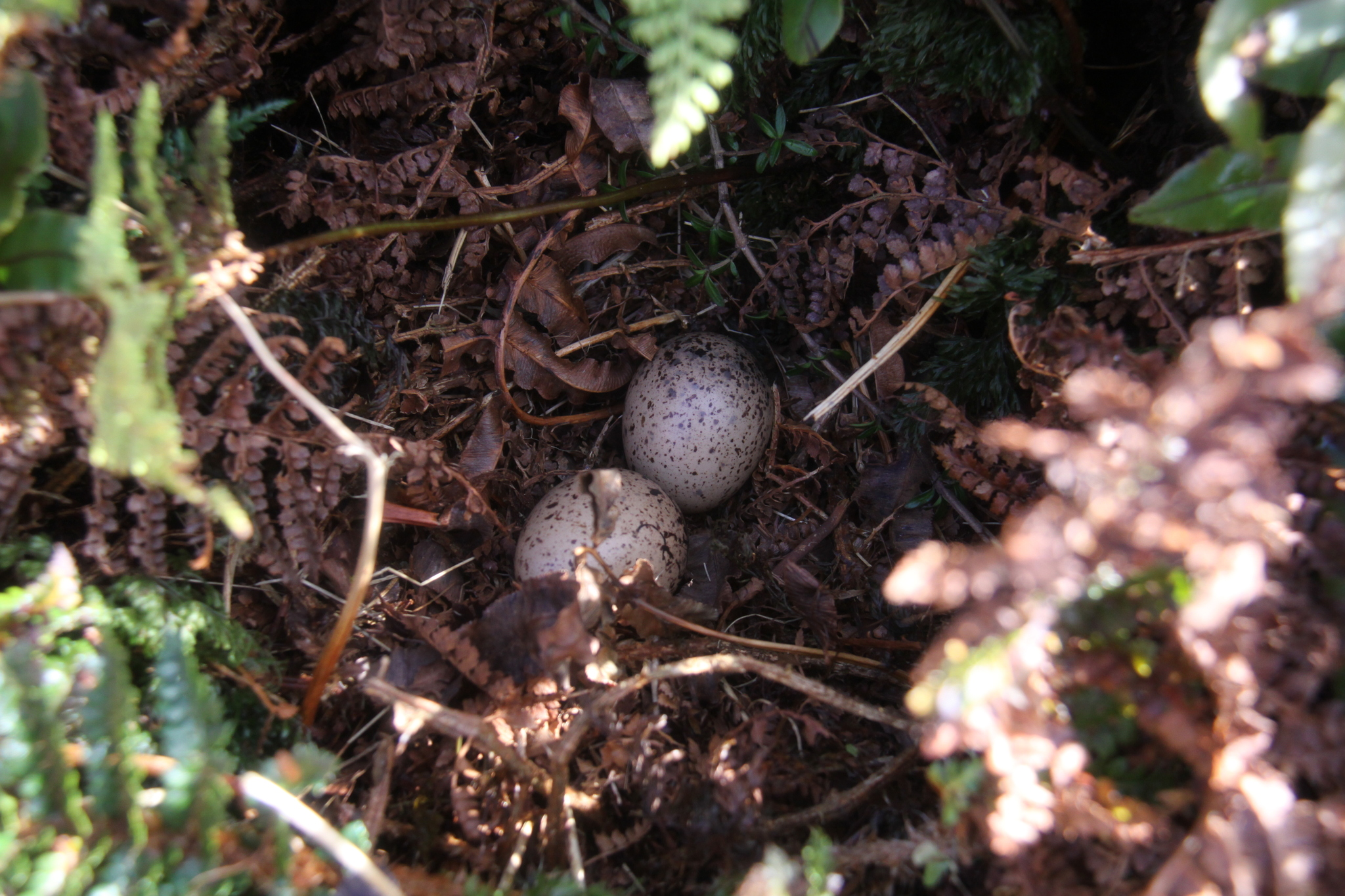
Antipodes snipe eggs

Breeding is seasonal, with egg-laying beginning in mid to late August. The typical clutch size is two. “Hakawai” aerial displays have been recorded.

=== Feeding ===
The snipe have been recorded as feeding on a variety of invertebrates, including annelids, amphipods, isopods, arachnids and insects.

== Status and conservation ==
The population of the snipe is estimated at 8,000 birds. It has been classified as a range-restricted island endemic with a stable population.
