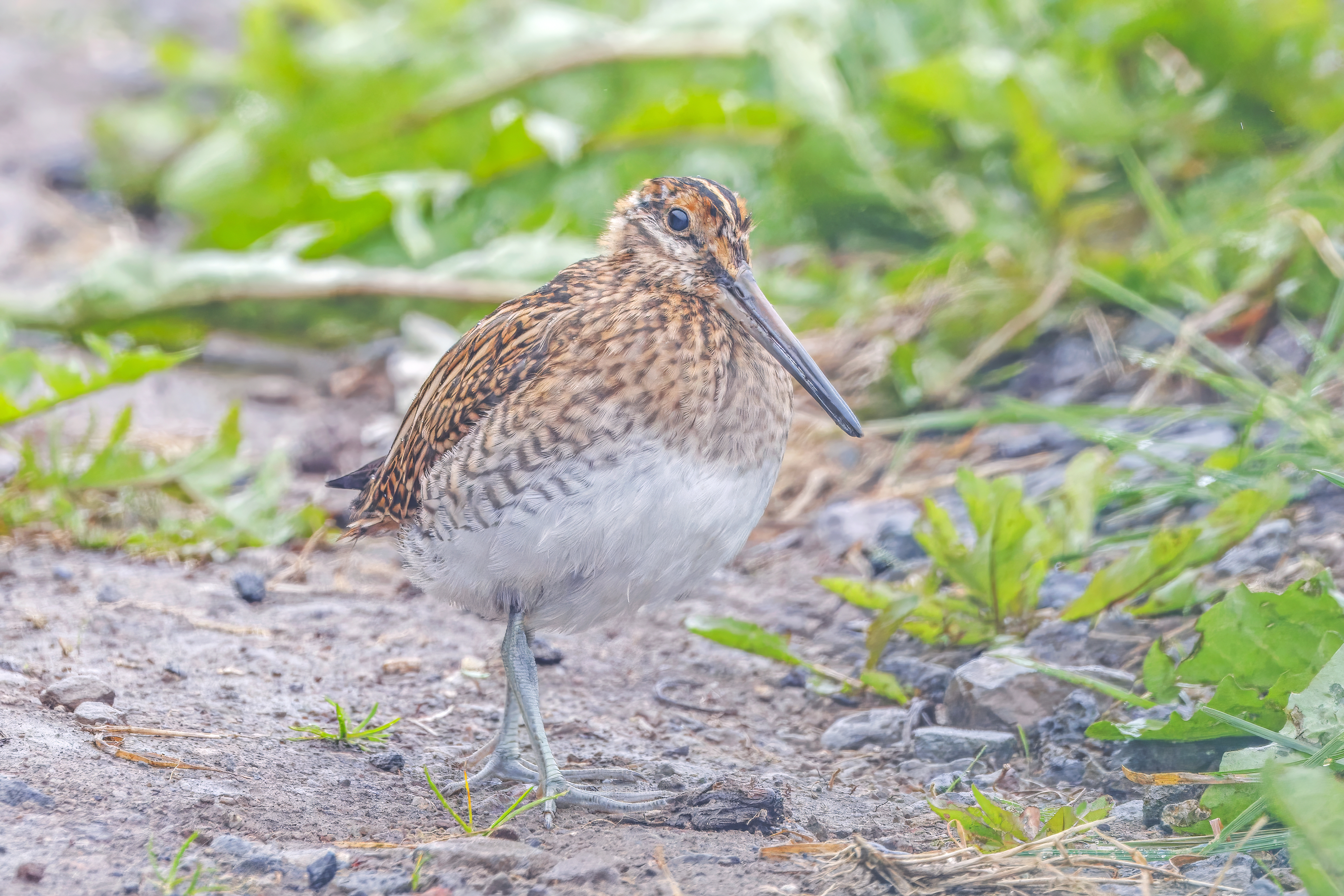
- Gallinago gallingo faeroeensis, Iceland

Scientific classification
- Kingdom: Animalia
- Phylum: Chordata
- Class: Aves
- Order: Charadriiformes
- Suborder: Scolopaci
- Family: Scolopacidae

Groups included
- Lymnocryptes; Gallinago; Coenocorypha

Cladistically included but traditionally excluded taxa
- Scolopax

= Snipe =

Common name for wading birds

A snipe is any of about 26 wading bird species in three genera in the family Scolopacidae. They are distinguished by a very long, slender bill, eyes placed high on the head, and cryptic/camouflaging plumage. The snipes in the genus Gallinago have a nearly worldwide distribution, the Lymnocryptes snipes are restricted to Asia and Europe, and the snipes in the genus Coenocorypha are now found only in the outlying islands of New Zealand. The genus Lymnocryptes is more closely related to woodcocks (Scolopax) than it is to other snipes; with woodcocks included, the four genera form a monophyletic group within the wider family Scolopacidae. The three species of painted-snipes are not closely related to the typical snipes, and are placed in their own family, the Rostratulidae.

== Behaviour ==
A snipe searches for invertebrates in the mud with a "sewing-machine" action of its long bill. The sensitivity of the bill is caused by filaments belonging to the fifth pair of nerves, which run almost to the tip and open immediately under the soft cuticle in a series of cells; this adaptation gives this portion of the surface of the premaxillaries a honeycomb-like appearance, and with these filaments, the bird can sense its food in the mud without seeing it. A similar adaptation is found in sandpipers.

== Diet ==
Snipe species feed mainly on insect larvae. Other invertebrate prey includes snails, crustaceans, and worms. The snipe's bill allows the very tip to remain closed while the snipe slurps up invertebrates.

== Habitat ==
Snipe can be found in various types of wet marshy settings, including bogs, swamps, wet meadows, and along rivers, coast lines, and ponds. They settle in both areas with dense vegetation and marshy areas with patchy cover to hide from predators.

== Hunting ==
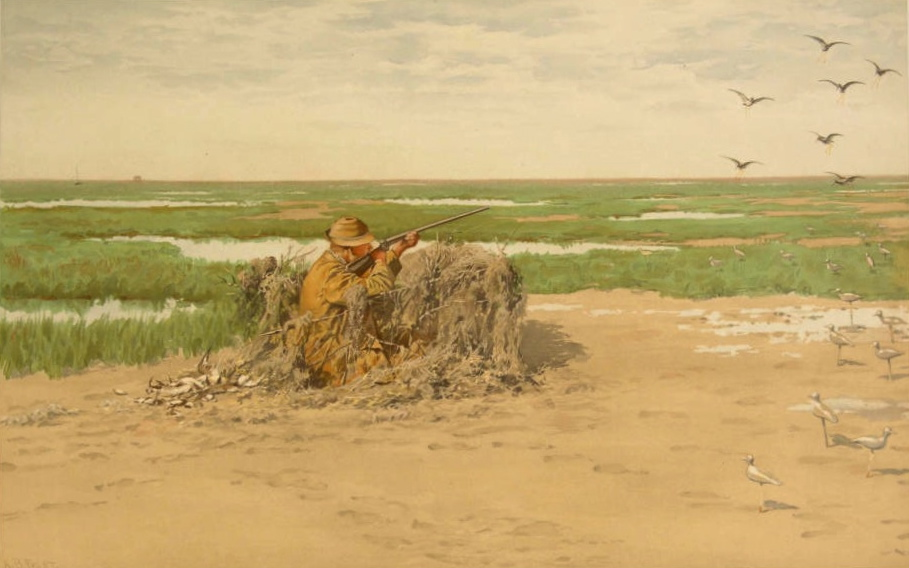
Depiction of a snipe hunter, by A. B. Frost

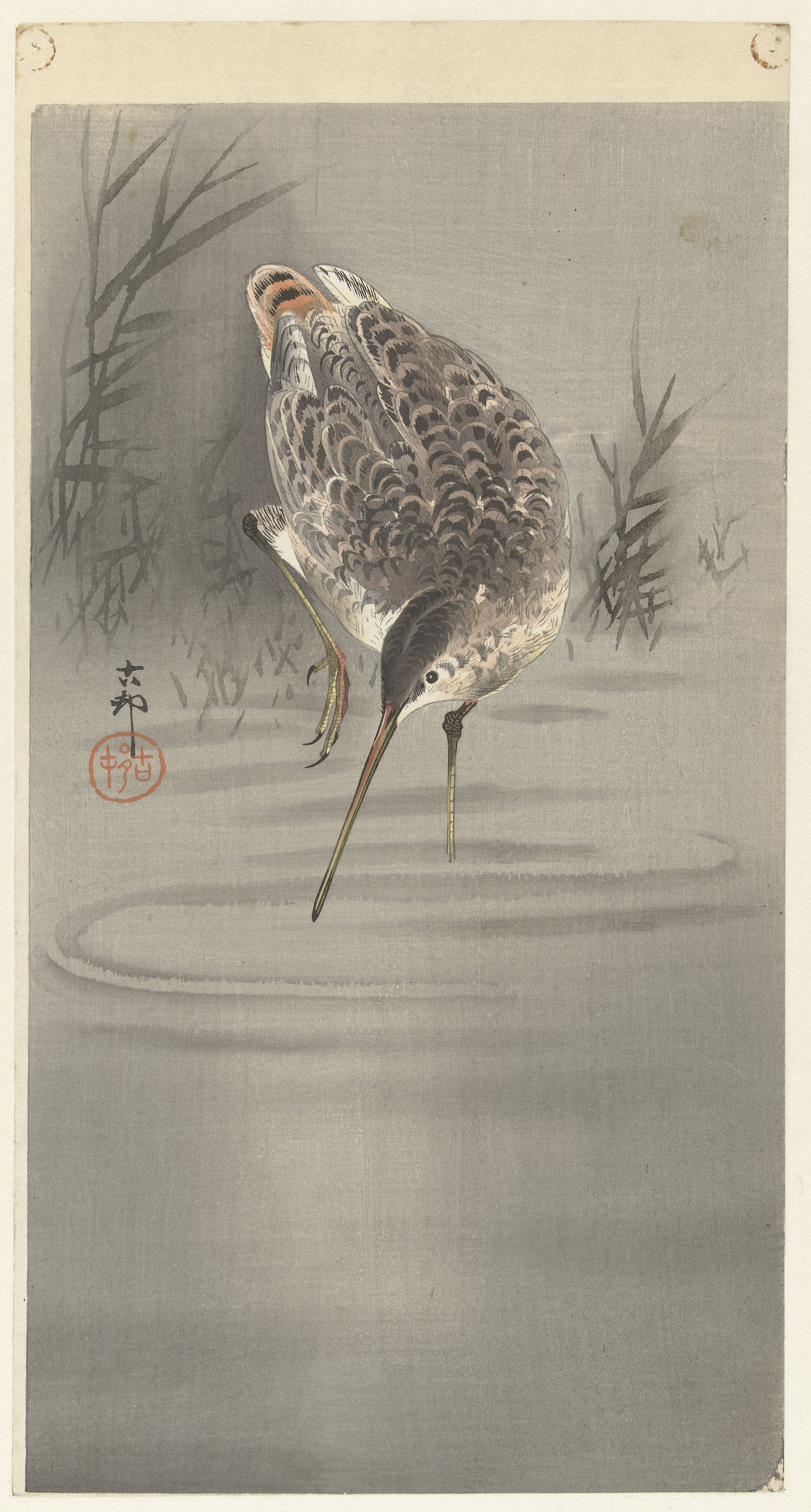
Snipe in Water, by Ohara Koson. Japan, 1900–1930

Camouflage may enable a snipe to remain undetected by hunters in marshland. The bird is also highly alert and startled easily, rarely staying long in the open. If the snipe flies, hunters have difficulty wing-shooting due to the bird's erratic flight pattern.

The difficulties involved around hunting snipe gave rise to the military term "sniper", which originally meant an expert hunter highly skilled in marksmanship and camouflaging, but later evolved to mean a sharpshooter or a shooter who makes distant shots from concealment.

== See also ==
- Snipe eel
- Woodcock
