= Corpuscles of Herbst =

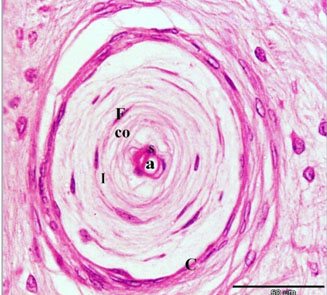
Herbst corpuscle from the bill of a duck under an electron scanning microscope. Image displays the central axon of the corpuscle surrounded by concentric layers bound by a capsule.

The corpuscles of Herbst or Herbst corpuscles are nerve-endings similar to the Pacinian corpuscle, found in the mucous membrane of the tongue, in pits on the beak and in other parts of the bodies of birds. They differ from Pacinian corpuscles in being smaller and more elongated, in having thinner and more closely placed capsules, and in that the axis-cylinder in the central clear space is encircled by a continuous row of nuclei. Kiwis, sandpipers, and ibises have Herbst corpuscles on their bill tips allowing them to sense vibrations. They are named after the German embryologist Curt Alfred Herbst.

In many wading birds, a large number of Herbst corpuscles are found embedded in pits on the mandible that are believed to enable birds to sense prey under wet sand or soil.
