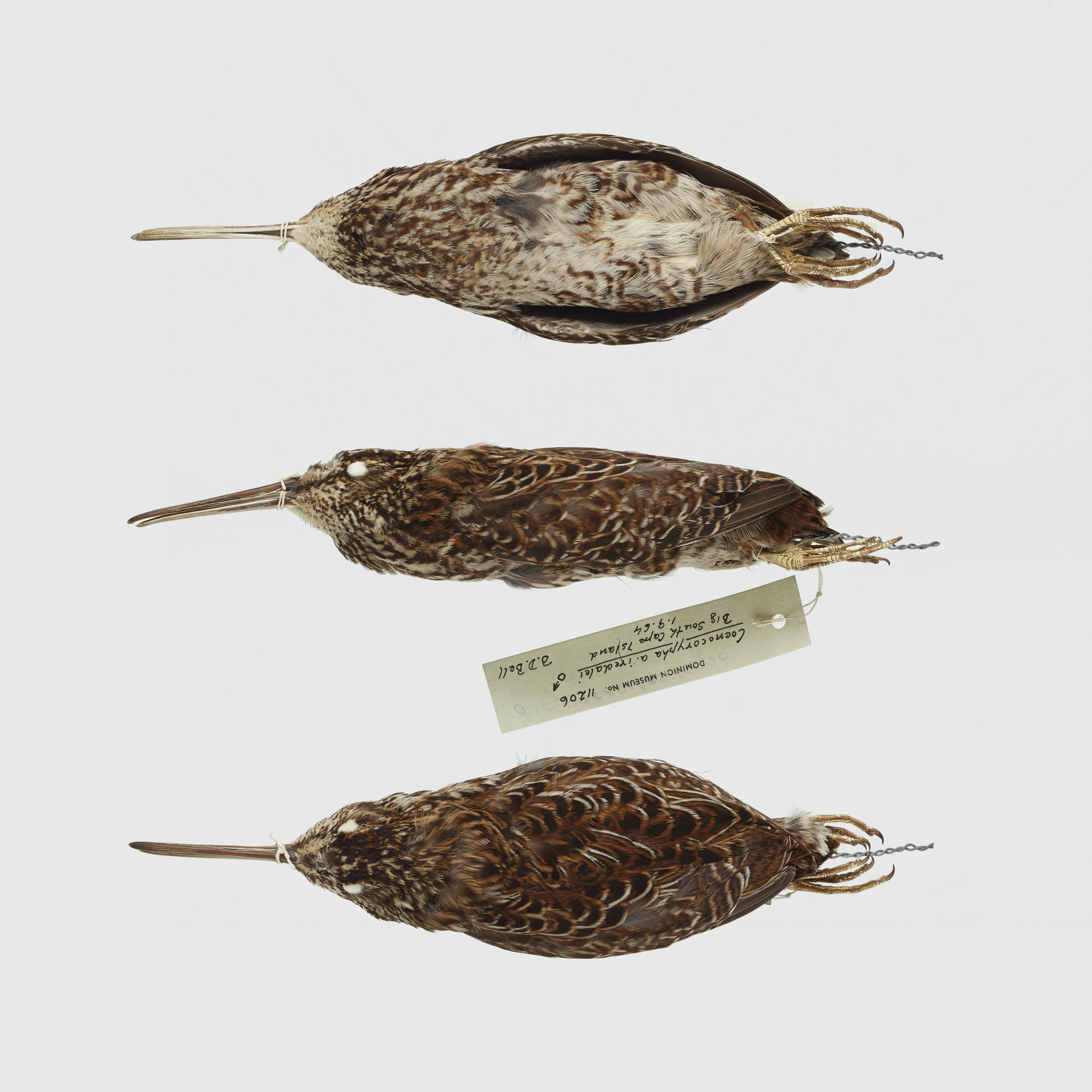
- Specimen of Coenocorypha iredalei, the South Island snipe.

Conservation status
- Extinct (1964) (IUCN 3.1)

- Extinct (1964) (NZ TCS)

Scientific classification
- Kingdom: Animalia
- Phylum: Chordata
- Class: Aves
- Order: Charadriiformes
- Family: Scolopacidae
- Genus: Coenocorypha
- Species: †C. iredalei

Binomial name
- †Coenocorypha iredalei Rothschild, 1921

Synonyms
- Gallinago aucklandica; Coenocorypha aucklandica iredalei

= South Island snipe =

Extinct species of bird

The South Island snipe (Coenocorypha iredalei), also known as the Stewart Island snipe or tutukiwi in Māori, is an extinct species of bird in the sandpiper family Scolopacidae that was endemic to New Zealand.

== Taxonomy and etymology ==
Determination of the taxonomy of Coenocorypha snipe has been hindered by lack of material, erroneous locality data, misidentified specimens and confused nomenclature. The South Island snipe was formerly considered to be a subspecies of the Subantarctic snipe (Coenocorypha aucklandica), but has since been elevated to a full species, with fossil material from the South Island referred to it. The specific epithet honours ornithologist Tom Iredale. The Māori name, "tutukiwi", which may be applied to other Coenocorypha snipes, alludes to the bird's fancied resemblance to a miniature kiwi.

== Distribution and extinction ==
The South Island snipe is extinct. Its prehistoric distribution comprised the South Island and Stewart Island, including some smaller islands off Stewart Island. It became extinct on both South Island and Stewart Island following the occupation of New Zealand by Polynesians (the ancestors of the Māori people) and the associated introduction of Pacific rats (Rattus exulans). It survived on at least nine small islands until the late 19th and 20th centuries but was progressively extirpated on them following introductions of rats and other exotic predators, as well as weka, with the last records coming from Big South Cape and Pukaweka Islands in the early 1960s.

The final chapter of the story of the South Island snipe came with the accidental introduction of black rats to Big South Cape Island, and the consequent attempt in 1964 by the New Zealand Wildlife Service, including Brian Bell and Don Merton, to rescue the snipe by transferring individuals to a rat-free island. Two birds were caught on 30 August and placed in an aviary. However, they were difficult to care for because of their need for a continuous supply of live food, and both died on 1 September. Since then there have been no acceptable records of the species. Subsequently, some 40 years later on 16 April 2005, 30 Snares snipes, then considered to be conspecific though a different subspecies, were translocated successfully by the New Zealand Department of Conservation to Putauhinu Island, only 1.5 km (0.93 mi) west of Big South Cape Island and a former home of South Island snipe, after the rats were eradicated there.

== Description ==
The snipe was similar to other Coenocorypha snipe, a small (21–24 cm in length), chunky and cryptically patterned wader with bars, stripes and spots in shades of brown ranging from buffy-white to nearly black, with longitudinal stripes on the face and crown. It had a long bill, with a short neck, legs and tail. The outer tail feathers were narrow and stiffened, a modification to produce the distinctive roaring sound of the nocturnal "hakawai" aerial display. The species differed from others in the genus by details of plumage patterning and shading – in having a scalloped breast and flanks with rufous and cinnamon tinges.

== Behaviour ==
One of the few people to make any kind of field study of the South Island snipe was naturalist Herbert Guthrie-Smith who reported on a 1923 visit to Big South Cape Island in his book Sorrows and Joys of a New Zealand Naturalist (1936):

"Snipe begin to lay about the end of October and continue during the early November. Except that the legs are pale yellow they much resemble the common Snipe of the Old Country. The sexes vary but little, the male rather larger and of rather a richer plumage. The birds stand about two and a half inches high and measure along the body about six inches. Both male and female sit.

"They trust to concealment, not to flight. Though ever so tame in our company they never ventured further than a few feet from covert, and the whole island is covert; watched through glasses at a distance the same distaste for the open was apparent. Even when suddenly put off the nest with a violent start – and thrice I hardened myself to this iniquity – the perturbed bird would merely emerge with full spread pinions from its isolated humpie of manuka. There were no signs however faint of ability or desire to fly. Often during incubation of the eggs the bill of the sitting bird will be deeply dived into the ground through the nest fabric; often, too, on its nest the bird will sit leaning for long periods on its bill as if for support.

"Another nest placed also in the shelter of a low manuka cushion showed more care in construction; on granite grit and sand thickly littered with dracophyllum needles, it was piled a couple of inches high with moss, softest lichen and minutest lengths of frayed lissom manuka twiglets. Of this nest the eggs, also two in number and also large in proportion to the size of the Snipe, were greeny brown in hue with dark spottings and blotches evenly distributed over the whole surface.

"These were delightful hours indeed watching in perfect quietude the pair of incubating Snipe, sharing the responsibility of their nest. As happily, too, the days passed following the appearances and disappearances, the exits and returns of the parents of the single chicks amongst the prone strips and cushions of green manuka, the grey flat dead sticks, the lichen stiff, like coral, and dwarf grass tree no taller than real grass. Moving with a curious halting, hesitant gait, always they advanced rocking as if balanced on springs. Usually the male, like the country Scotsman of half a century ago kirkward bent with his womenfolk, moves a foot or two ahead. If lost to sight, however, for the briefest period communication is kept up betwixt the pair by a low hoarse double croak. This is uttered from time to time as the pair or trio irregularly progress, sometimes at a walk, sometimes at a trot, but always whether slow or fast – and if necessary they can dart and disappear like lightning – probing, probing, quickly, eagerly, decidedly. The long bill is held well forward after the manner of the Kiwi – a Lilliputian stride or two, five or six rapid spearings into the ground, a brief hesitation, a prolonged sniff, a deeper and more assured perforation of the spongy soil, a quick little mouse-like run, a pause, an advance, a downward thrust of the beak, so they moved ahead. Each minute red worm hardly thicker than a pin could upon withdrawal of the bill always be seen dangling at its extremity ere being passed downwards and swallowed. They fed also on small chrysalis-like objects on the surface and once I noticed the female take from the male an inch-long pale worm of another kind."
