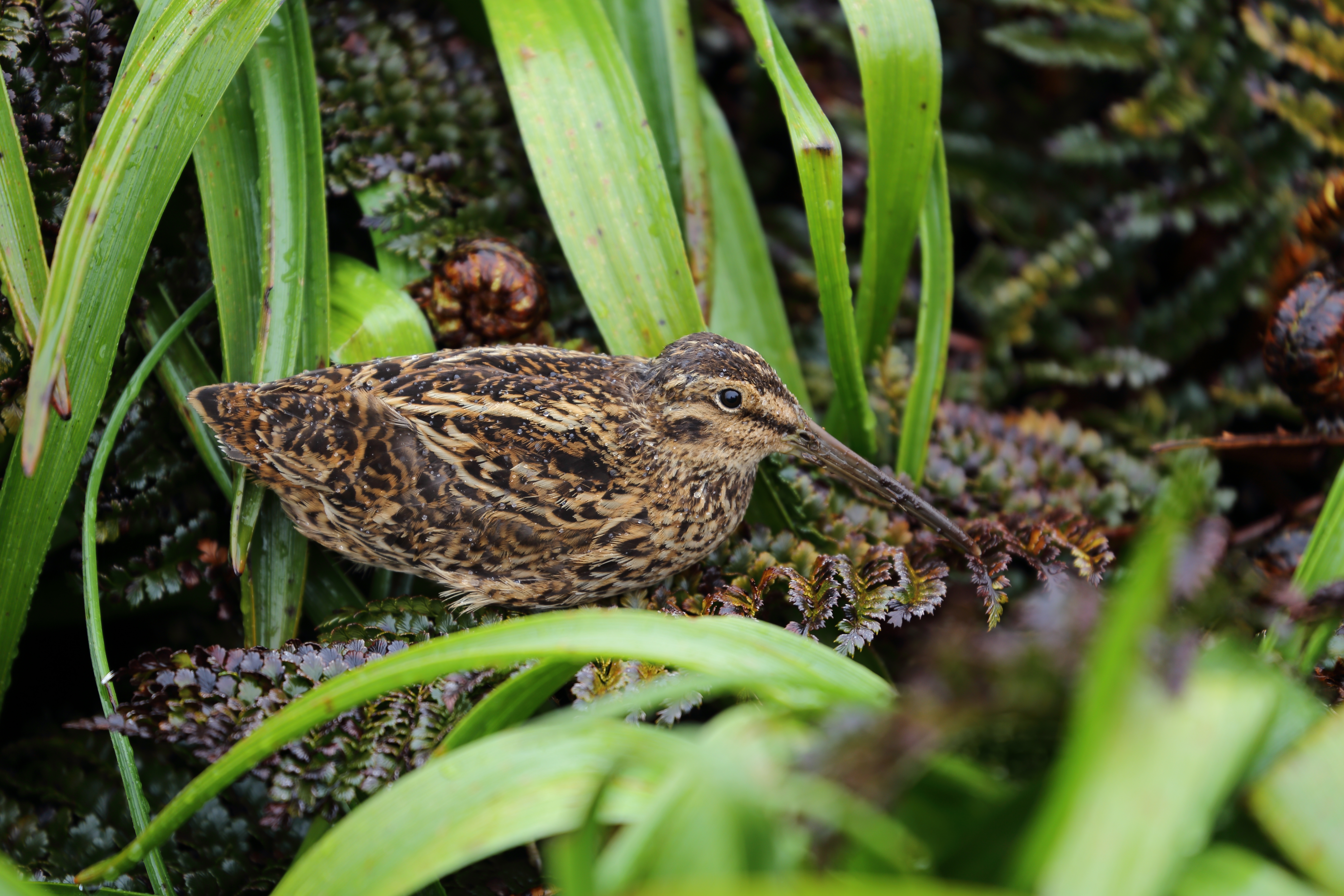

Scientific classification
- Kingdom: Animalia
- Phylum: Chordata
- Class: Aves
- Order: Charadriiformes
- Family: Scolopacidae
- Genus: Coenocorypha
- Species: C. aucklandica
- Subspecies: C. a. perseverance

Trinomial name
- Coenocorypha aucklandica perseverance Miskelly & Baker, 2010
- Native range

= Campbell snipe =

Subspecies of bird

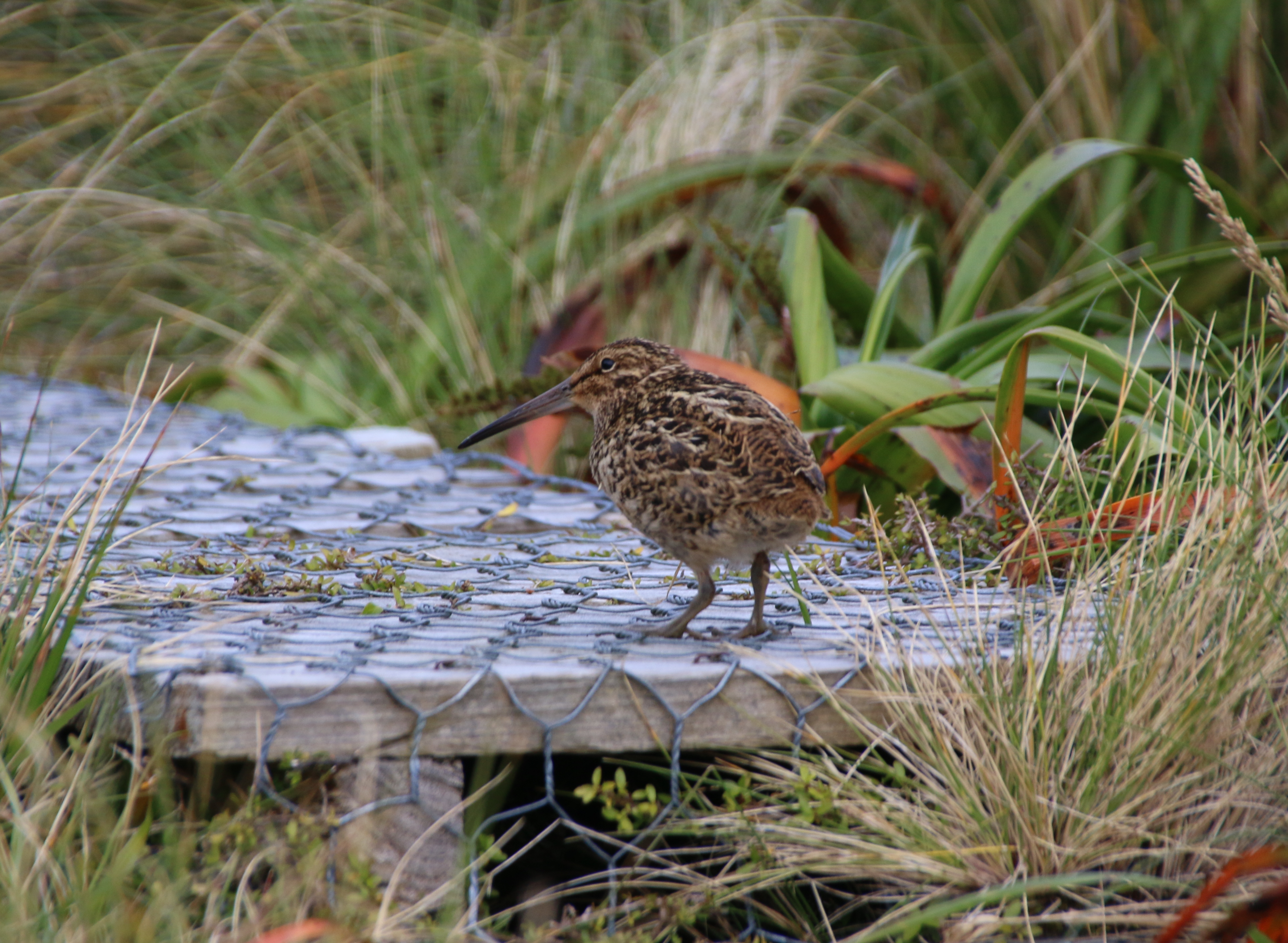
Campbell snipe (Coenocorypha aucklandica perseverance) on the boardwalk of Campbell Island, February 2017.

The Campbell snipe (Coenocorypha aucklandica perseverance), also known as the Campbell Island snipe, is a rare subspecies of the Subantarctic snipe, endemic to Campbell Island, a subantarctic island south of New Zealand in the Southern Ocean. It was not formally described until January 2010. The subspecific name alludes to the name of the sealing brig Perseverance, captained by Frederick Hasselborough, that discovered Campbell Island in 1810, and which probably inadvertently introduced rats to the island when it was wrecked there in 1828.

== History ==
The existence of the Campbell snipe was unknown until 1997 when, during a search for the Campbell teal, there was the chance discovery of a small population on an almost inaccessible rock, Jacquemart Island. Thus there is not much information about it and it remains one of the least known birds in the world.

Austral snipe are extinct on the mainland of New Zealand but continue to survive on several subantarctic islands. A naturalist landed on Campbell island in 1840 and whilst there found no birds to be present: all endemic land birds had been destroyed by rats from shipwrecks in the area (in the mid-19th century). By 2001 the rats on Campbell Island had been eradicated (at the time, the largest eradication of rats as a conservation effort in the world) and it was hoped that the snipe would naturally return to their original home.

In 2006 BDG Synthesis funded a search effort on Campbell Island. Snipe expert Dr Colin Miskelly, and James Fraser with a snipe dog, surveyed the island for snipe to see if they had re-established on the main island. They also intended to acquire DNA for analysis and comparison with the extinct mainland species. The snipe had already re-established with a population of about 30 individuals. This news was greeted with relief as it was thought that the species would have to be re-introduced from Jacquemart Island through human intervention. However, no intervention has been necessary as the snipe are naturally repopulating the 11,000-hectare pest-free island.

== Bibliography ==
- Miskelly, Colin M.; Baker, A.J. (2010a). "Description of a new subspecies of Coenocorypha snipe from subantarctic Campbell Island, New Zealand". Notornis. 56 (3): 113–123. doi:10.63172/883299mqhyhb.
- Miskelly, Colin M.; Baker, A.J. (2010b). "Corrected publication date for Coenocorypha aucklandica perseverance". Notornis. 57: 56. doi:10.63172/697174fxuret.
- "Campbell Island snipe (Coenocorypha undescribed species) recovery following rat eradication (DOC Science Poster no.92)" (PDF). Miskelly, Colin; & Fraser, James. NZ Department of Conservation. 2006-07-01.
- "New Zealand's newest bird named after vessel that nearly destroyed it". DOC media release. NZ Department of Conservation. 2010-02-16. Archived from the original on 2011-11-08.
