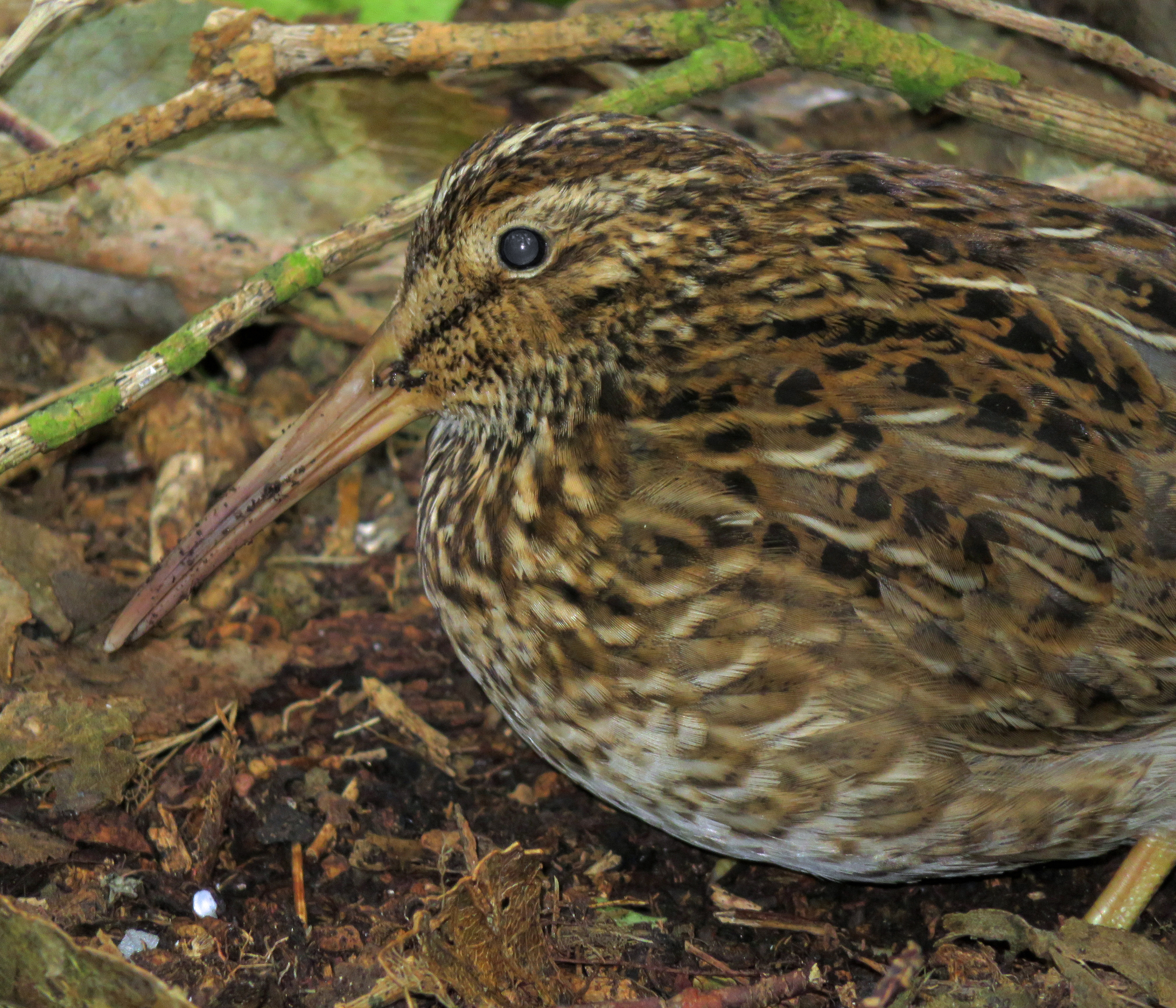

Conservation status
- Vulnerable (IUCN 3.1)

Scientific classification
- Kingdom: Animalia
- Phylum: Chordata
- Class: Aves
- Order: Charadriiformes
- Family: Scolopacidae
- Genus: Coenocorypha
- Species: C. pusilla

Binomial name
- Coenocorypha pusilla (Buller, 1869)

Synonyms
- Gallinago pusilla Buller, 1869

= Chatham Islands snipe =

Species of bird

The Chatham Islands snipe (Coenocorypha pusilla), also known as the Chatham snipe, is a species of wader in the family Scolopacidae. It is endemic to the Chatham Islands of New Zealand, and is only found on a few islands in the south of the Chatham Islands group.

Its natural habitats are temperate forests and temperate grassland.

The Chatham Islands snipe feeds by probing into the ground in search of worms, amphipods, insects and larvae.

== Scientific discovery ==
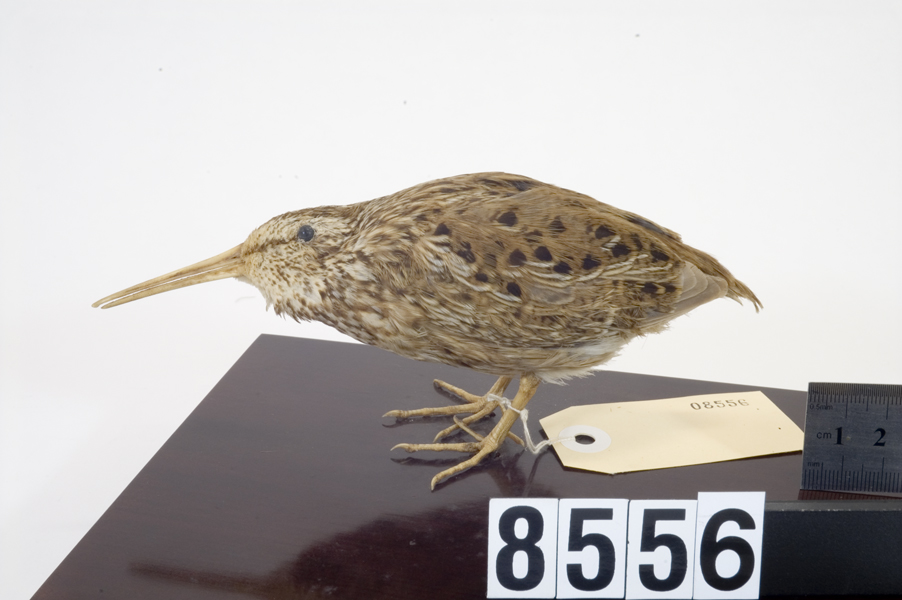
Chatham Islands snipe (Coenocorypha pusilla) mounted skin

In 1868 the Chatham Islands snipe was collected by naturalist Charles Traill and was sent to ornithologist Walter Buller who described it as a new species of snipe. On an exploratory mission to the islands in 1871, Henry Travers only found the snipe on Mangere Island. Attempts to return snipe to main Chatham Island would be hampered by the presence of introduced mammals and of weka, which are predators of snipe chicks.
