= Taukihepa / Big South Cape Island =

Island in New Zealand

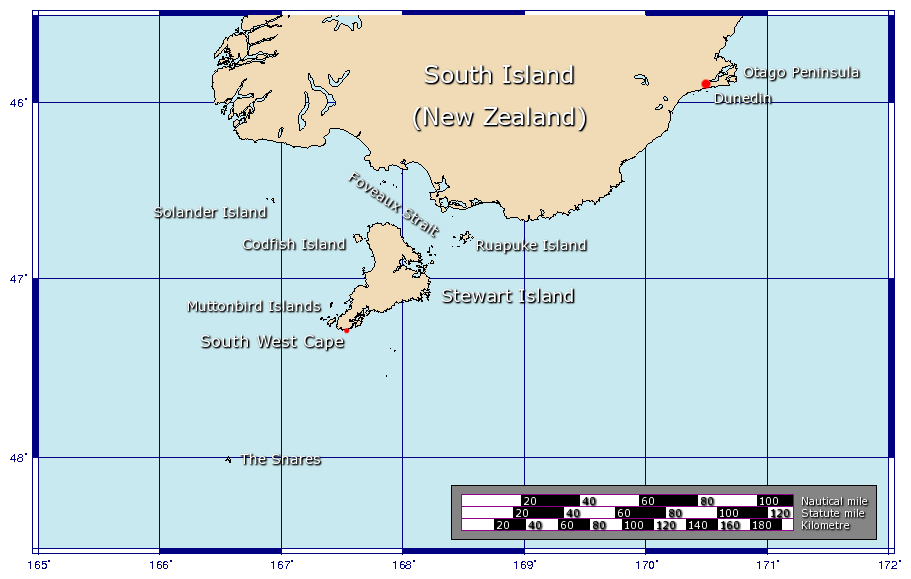
- Taukihepa / Big South Cape Island is the largest of the islands marked on this map as "Muttonbird Islands" to the southwest of Stewart Island / Rakiura

Geography
- Location: South Tasman Sea, southwest of Stewart Island / Rakiura
- Coordinates: 47°14′23″S 167°24′02″E
- Archipelago: Tītī / Muttonbird Islands
- Area: 9 km^{2} (3.5 sq mi)
- Length: 5.5 km (3.42 mi)
- Width: 2.5 km (1.55 mi)
- Highest elevation: 235 m (771 ft)

Administration
- New Zealand
- Regional council: Southland

Demographics
- Population: 0

Taukihepa / Big South Cape Island is an offshore island of New Zealand to the west of the southern tip of Stewart Island / Rakiura. The island is the largest of the Tītī / Muttonbird Islands, and as such has no permanent inhabitants but is visited by muttonbirders in search of sooty shearwaters, known in New Zealand as "muttonbirds".

Māori named the island "Taukihepa" and Europeans, who arrived later, called it "Big South Cape". The island was given dual names in 1998 as part of a Treaty of Waitangi settlement with Ngāi Tahu.

The island is the largest of a group of islands off the southwestern coast of Stewart Island / Rakiura, from which it is separated by a 1,500-metre (4,921 ft) wide channel. Surrounding smaller islands include Poutama Island to the south, Putauhina Island and the Putauhina Nuggets to the northwest, and Solomon Island to the north. The island rises to a height of 235 metres (771 ft) at its centre, and numerous small streams run to the coast. Named features on the island include two inlets – Murderers Cove in the central east coast and Puwai Bay in the island's southwest. It has an area of about 900 hectares (2,200 acres).

== Rat invasion ==
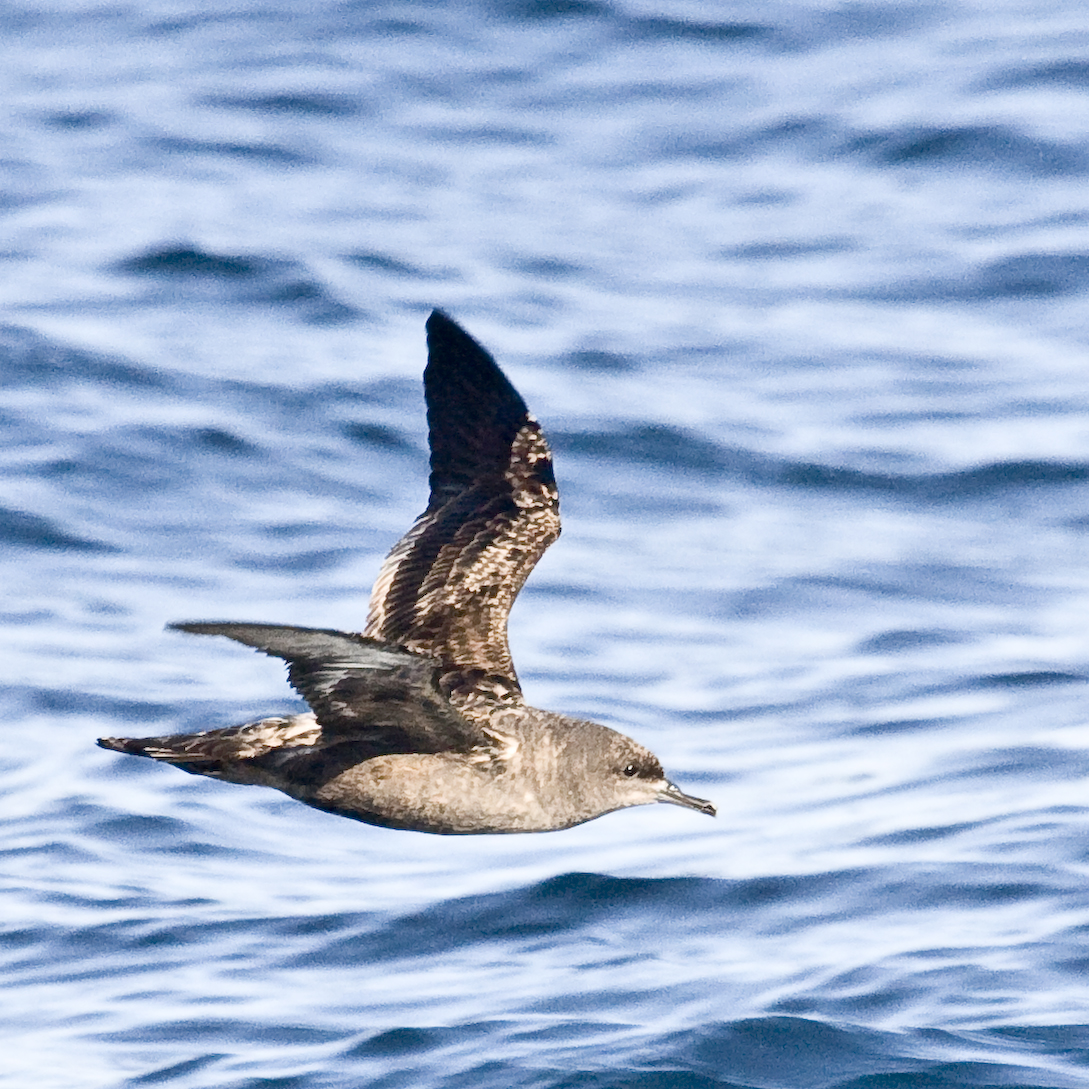
Sooty shearwater

Māori muttonbirders had traditionally visited the island each summer to hunt sooty shearwaters (muttonbirds) that came to nest on the island in the spring. In March 1964, muttonbirders arrived to find the island had been devastated by the effect of rats that were causing one of New Zealand's greatest ecological disasters of the twentieth century. Previously free of mammalian predators, the ecology of the island was devastated in a matter of years and many endemic species of bird (some flightless) were driven to extinction. The surviving biomass of insect and bird life has been heavily reduced. An eradication programme was initiated to rid the island of rats and the island was rat-free again in 2006.

== Animals that became extinct ==
Despite intervention by the New Zealand Wildlife Service that trapped and transferred some surviving birds to other, rat free, off-shore islands, two species of bird did not survive and became extinct. These were Stead's bush wren and the South Island snipe. The New Zealand greater short-tailed bat also became extinct.

== See also ==
- Conservation in New Zealand
- List of Antarctic and subantarctic islands
- List of islands of New Zealand
- New Zealand Subantarctic Islands
