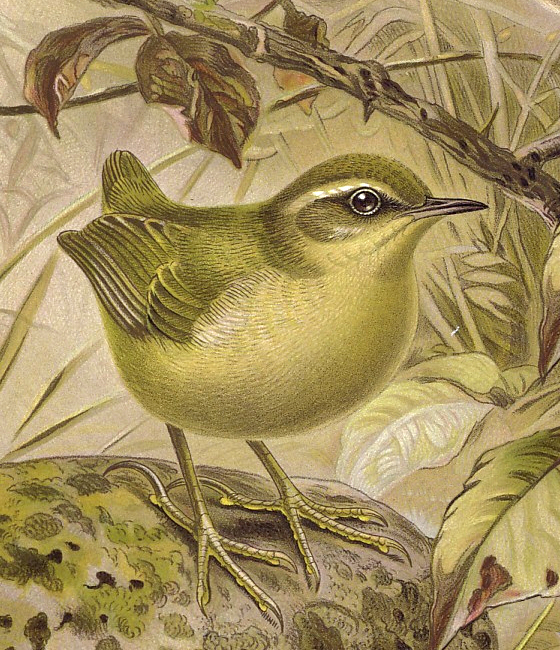
- A South Island wren.

Scientific classification
- Kingdom: Animalia
- Phylum: Chordata
- Class: Aves
- Order: Passeriformes
- Family: Acanthisittidae
- Genus: Xenicus; G.R. Gray, 1855

Type species
- Motacilla longipes Gmelin, 1789

Synonyms
- Pachyplichas (Millener, 1988)

= Xenicus =

Genus of birds

Xenicus is a genus of birds in the family Acanthisittidae. It contains New Zealand wrens.

== Species ==
- New Zealand rock wren, Xenicus gilviventris
- Bushwren, †Xenicus longipes (extinct)
- South Island stout-legged wren, †Xenicus yaldwyni (extinct) – South Island, New Zealand
- North Island stout-legged wren, †Xenicus jagmi (extinct) – North Island, New Zealand

Lyall's wren was classified as Xenicus lyalli but is quite divergent, so it is placed in its own genus, Traversia.

== Taxonomy ==
The stout-legged wrens formed a species pair. They had reduced wings and robust legs indicating that they were adapted to a terrestrial existence and were either flightless or nearly so. Genetic evidence has indicated that the former genus Pachyplichas is nested within Xenicus, and stout-legged wrens must have evolved from a gracile-legged ancestor. A cladogram is given below.

- - Acanthisittidae
    - - Traversia
    - - - Kuiornis
        - Acanthisitta
      - - Xenicus longipes
        - - Xenicus gilviventris
          - Pachyplichas
