= Long-billed wren (New Zealand) =

Long-billed wren Temporal range: Pleistocene–Holocene

Scientific classification
- Kingdom: Animalia
- Phylum: Chordata
- Class: Aves
- Order: Passeriformes
- Family: Acanthisittidae
- Genus: †Dendroscansor; Millener & Worthy 1991
- Species: †D. decurvirostris

Binomial name
- †Dendroscansor decurvirostris Millener & Worthy 1991

Extinct species of bird

The long-billed wren (Dendroscansor decurvirostris) is an extinct species of New Zealand wren formerly endemic to the South Island of New Zealand. It was the only species in the genus Dendroscansor. It shares the name "long-billed wren" with the Brazilian bird Cantorchilus longirostris.

New Zealand's long-billed wren was a small bird with stout legs and tiny wings. Its reduced sternum suggests that it had weak flight muscles and was probably flightless, like the recently extinct Lyall's wren. Its weight is estimated at 30 g, which makes it heavier than any surviving New Zealand wren, but lighter than the also-extinct stout-legged wren. The bill of this species was both long and curved, unlike that of all other acanthisittid wrens.

The species is known only from subfossils at four sites in Northwest Nelson and Southland; it seems to have been absent from the North Island and eastern South Island. The holotype was collected in 1986 from Moonsilver Cave, on Barrans Flat, near Takaka. It is the rarest fossil wren from New Zealand and presumably was the least common species when it was still extant. It is thought to have lived in sub-alpine shrub and tussock (like the surviving New Zealand rock wren) and perhaps montane southern beech forest.

The long-billed wren went extinct before the arrival of European colonists and explorers in New Zealand. It was among the first wave of native bird species to go extinct after the introduction of Polynesian rats (or kiore). Like many New Zealand species, the long-billed wren presumably had few defences against novel predators such as rats.
