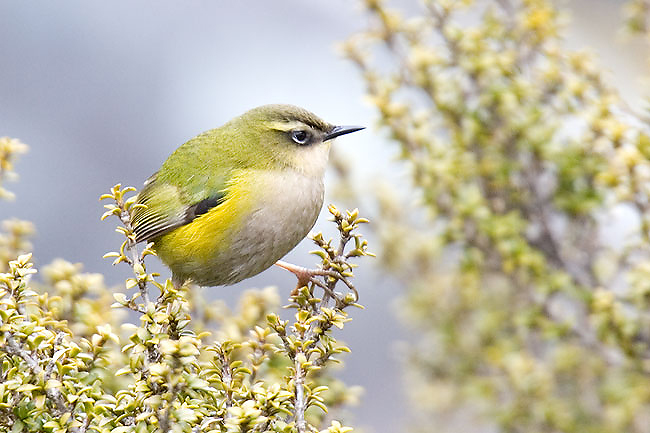
- New Zealand rock wren

Scientific classification
- Kingdom: Animalia
- Phylum: Chordata
- Class: Aves
- Order: Passeriformes
- Suborder: Acanthisitti; Wolters, 1977
- Family: Acanthisittidae; Sundevall, 1872

Extant and subfossil genera
- †Traversia; Acanthisitta; Xenicus †Dendroscansor; Fossil genus, see text

= New Zealand wren =

New Zealand wrens Temporal range: Miocene–present

Family of birds

The New Zealand wrens are a family (Acanthisittidae) of tiny passerines endemic to New Zealand. They were represented by seven Holocene species in four or five genera, although only two species in two genera survive today. They are understood to form a distinct lineage within the passerines, but authorities differ on their assignment to the oscines or suboscines (the two suborders that between them make up the Passeriformes). More recent studies suggest that they form a third, most ancient, suborder Acanthisitti and have no living close relatives at all. They are called "wrens" because of similarities in appearance and behaviour to the true wrens (Troglodytidae) but are not members of that family.

New Zealand wrens are mostly insectivorous foragers of New Zealand's forests, with one species, the New Zealand rock wren, being restricted to alpine areas. Both the remaining species are poor fliers and four of the five extinct species are known or suspected to have been flightless. Along with the long-legged bunting from Tenerife, one of the Canary Islands, they are the only passerines known to have lost the ability to fly. Of the species for which the plumage is known, they are drab-coloured birds with brown-green plumage. They form monogamous pair bonds to raise their young, laying their eggs in small nests in trees or amongst rocks. They are diurnal and like all New Zealand passerines, are, for the most part, sedentary.

Like many New Zealand birds, New Zealand wrens suffered several extinctions after the arrival of humans in New Zealand. Of the seven Holocene species, only two survive today. The South Island stout-legged wren, North Island stout-legged wren, and long-billed wren became extinct after the arrival of the Māori and the Polynesian rat. They are known to science only from subfossil remains. At the same time, Lyall's wren became extinct on the main islands and survived only as a relict population on Stephens Island in the Cook Strait. Lyall's wren and the bushwren became extinct after the arrival of Europeans in 1895 and 1972 respectively. Of the two remaining species, the rifleman is still common in both the North and South Islands. The New Zealand rock wren is restricted to the alpine areas of the South Island and is considered endangered.

== Taxonomy and systematics ==
The taxonomy of the New Zealand wrens has been a subject of considerable debate since their discovery, although they have long been known to be an unusual family. In the 1880s, Forbes assigned the New Zealand wrens to the suboscines related to the cotingas and the pittas (and gave the family the name Xenicidae). Later, they were thought to be closer to the ovenbirds and antbirds. Sibley's 1970 study comparing egg-white proteins moved them to the oscines, but later studies, including the 1982 DNA-DNA hybridisation study, suggested the family was a sister taxon to the suboscines and the oscines. This theory has proven most robust since then and the New Zealand wrens might be the survivors of a lineage of passerines that was isolated when New Zealand broke away from Gondwana 82–85 million years ago (Mya), though a pre-Paleogene origin of passerines is highly disputed and tends to be rejected in more recent studies.

As no evidence indicates passerines were flightless when they arrived on New Zealand (that apomorphy is extremely rare and unevenly distributed in Passeriformes), they are not required by present theories to have been distinct in the Mesozoic. As unequivocal Passeriformes are known from Australia some 55 million years ago, the acanthisittids' ancestors likely arrived in the Late Paleocene from Australia or the then-temperate Antarctic coasts. Plate tectonics indicate that the shortest distance between New Zealand and those two continents was roughly 1,500 km (930 mi) at that time. New Zealand's minimum distance from Australia is a bit more today – some 1,700 km (1,100 mi) – whereas it is now at least 2,500 km (1,600 mi) from Antarctica.

The extant species are closely related and thought to be descendants of birds that survived a genetic bottleneck caused by the marine transgression during the Oligocene, when most of New Zealand was under water. The earliest known fossil is Kuiornis indicator from the Early Miocene St Bathans fauna. Kuiornis is thought to be more closely related to Acanthisitta than to other Acanthisittids.

The relationships between genera and species were formerly poorly understood. The extant genus Acanthisitta has one species, the rifleman, and the other surviving genus, Xenicus, includes the New Zealand rock wren and the recently extinct bushwren. Some authorities have retained Lyall's wren in Xenicus as well, but it is often afforded its own monotypic genus, Traversia. The stout-legged wren (genus Pachyplichas) was originally split into two species, but more recent research disputes this. The final genus was Dendroscansor, which had one species, the long-billed wren. A mitochondrial DNA study in 2016 resolved much of the phylogeny, though the placement of Dendroscansor was unresolved due to lack of DNA testing due to the rarity of its remains. It was found that Xenicus was paraphyletic with respect to Pachyplichas, and that the stout legged wrens must have evolved from a gracile-legged ancestor, and the paper suggested placing the Pachyplichas species within Xenicus. It was also found that the split between Lyall's wren and other acanthisittids probably took place during the Oligocene, over 30 million years ago, so acanthisittids must have survived the Oligocene drowning. A cladogram is given below:

- - Acanthisittidae
    - - † Lyall's wren, Traversia lyalli
    - - - † Kuiornis indicator
        - Rifleman, Acanthisitta chloris
      - - † Bushwren, Xenicus longipes
        - - New Zealand rockwren, Xenicus gilviventris
          - † Pachyplichas – stout-legged wrens

=== Recent genera and species ===
- Genus †Traversia
  - †Lyall's wren, Traversia lyalli
- Genus Acanthisitta
  - Rifleman, Acanthisitta chloris
- Genus Xenicus
  - †Bushwren, Xenicus longipes
  - New Zealand rock wren, Xenicus gilviventris
  - †North Island stout-legged wren, Xenicus jagmi (possibly conspecific with Xenicus yaldwyni)
  - †South Island stout-legged wren, Xenicus yaldwyni
- Genus †Dendroscansor
  - †Long-billed wren (New Zealand), Dendroscansor decurvirostris

=== Fossil genus and species ===
†Kuiornis indicator from the Early Miocene St Bathans fauna

== Description ==
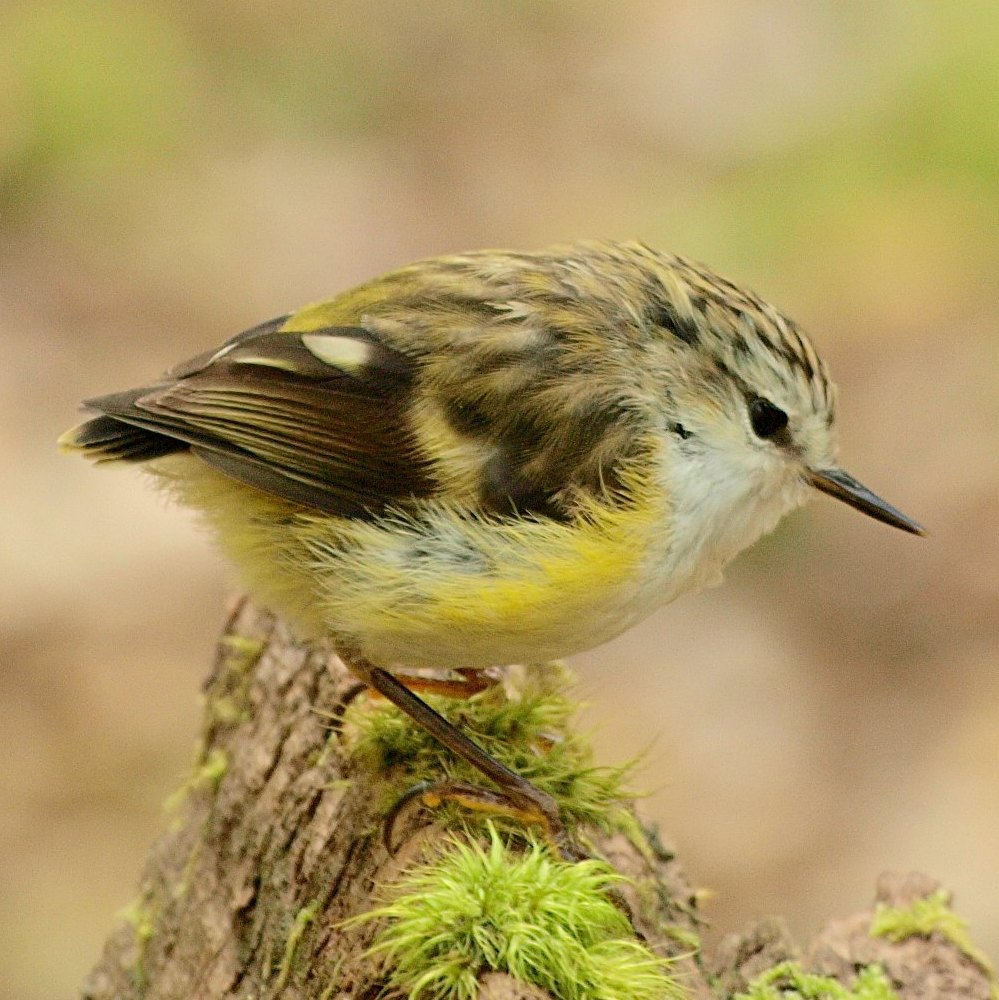
Female riflemen are larger than the males.

New Zealand wrens are tiny birds; the rifleman is the smallest of New Zealand's birds. Their length ranges from 7 to 10 cm and their weight ranges from as little as 5–7 g for the rifleman, to an estimated 50 g for the extinct stout-legged wren. The New Zealand rock wren (and probably the bushwren) weighs between 14 and 22 g and the extinct long-billed wren weighed around 30 g.

The plumage of the New Zealand wrens is only known for the four species seen by European scientists. All these species have dull green and brown plumage and all except Lyall's wren have a prominent supercilium above the eye. The plumage of males and females were alike in Lyall's wren and the bushwren; the New Zealand rock wren shows slight sexual dimorphism in its plumage and differences between the plumage of riflemen are pronounced, with the male having bright green upperparts and the female being duller and browner.

Both the New Zealand rock wren and the rifleman also show sexual dimorphism in size; unusually for passerines, the female is larger than the male. The female rifleman also exhibits other differences from the male, having a slightly more upturned bill than the male and a larger hind claw.

The New Zealand wrens evolved in the absence of mammals for many millions of years and the family was losing the ability to fly. Three species are thought to have lost the power of flight: the stout-legged wren, the long-billed wren and Lyall's wren. The skeletons of these species have massively reduced keels in the sternum and the flight feathers of Lyall's wren also indicate flightlessness. Contemporary accounts of the Lyall's wrens on Stephens Island describe the species as scurrying on the ground rather than flying.

== Distribution and habitat ==
The New Zealand wrens are endemic and restricted to the main and offshore islands of New Zealand; they have not been found on any of the outer islands such as the Chatham Islands or the Kermadec Islands. Prior to the arrival of humans in New Zealand (about 1280 CE), they had a widespread distribution across both the North and South Islands and on Stewart Island. The range of the rifleman and bushwren included southern beech forest and podocarp-broadleaf forest, with the range of the bushwren also including coastal forest and scrub, particularly the Stewart Island subspecies. Currently, the New Zealand rock wren is confined to alpine and subalpine zones (900–2500 m altitude) on the South Island. It is possible that the species was once present in the North Island, although this has never been proven. Lyall's wren was once thought to have been restricted to the tiny Stephens Island in Cook Strait, but fossil evidence has shown the species was once widespread in both the North and South Islands. The stout-legged wren was similarly found on both islands, but fossils of the long-billed wren have only been found in the South Island. Fossils of the long-billed wren are far less common than those of the other species, in fact, its bones are the rarest fossil finds in New Zealand.

After the wave of extinctions and range contractions caused by the arrival of mammals in New Zealand, the New Zealand wrens have a much reduced range. The New Zealand rock wren is now restricted to the South Island and is declining in numbers. The range of the rifleman initially contracted with the felling of forests for agriculture, but it has also expanded its range of habitats by moving into plantations of introduced exotic pines, principally the Monterey pine. It also enters other human-modified habitat when it adjoins native forest.

Like all New Zealand passerines, the New Zealand wrens are sedentary and are not thought to undertake any migrations. It is not known if the extinct species migrated, but it is considered highly unlikely, as three of the extinct species were flightless. The situation with the New Zealand rock wren is an ornithological mystery, as they are thought to live above the snow line where obtaining food during the winter would be extremely difficult. Searches have found no evidence that they move altitudinally during the winter, but they are also absent from their normal territories. They may enter a state of torpor (like the hummingbirds of the Americas or a number of Australian passerines) during at least part of the winter, but this has not yet been proved.
