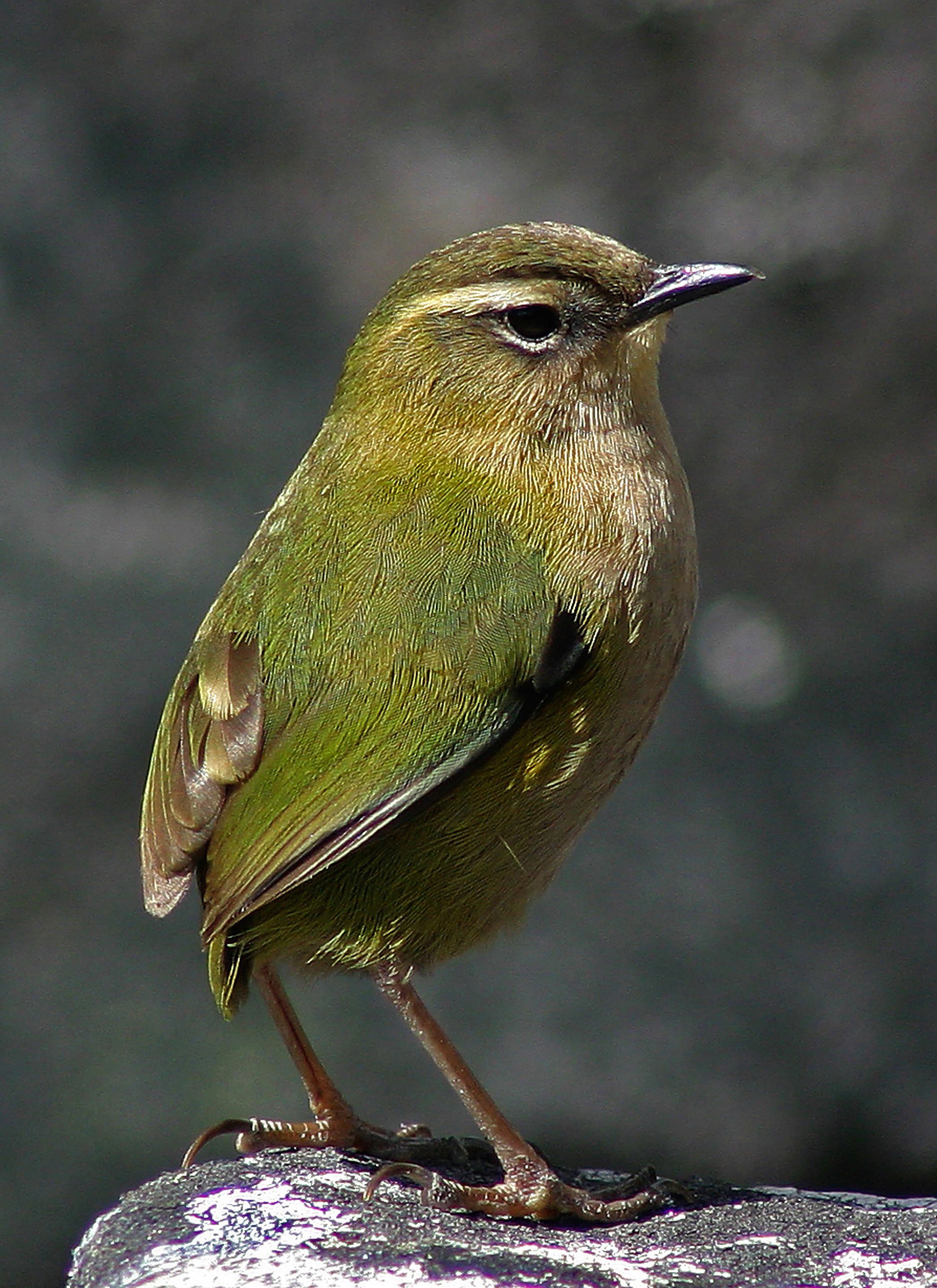

Conservation status
- Endangered (IUCN 3.1)

Scientific classification
- Kingdom: Animalia
- Phylum: Chordata
- Class: Aves
- Order: Passeriformes
- Family: Acanthisittidae
- Genus: Xenicus
- Species: X. gilviventris

Binomial name
- Xenicus gilviventris Pelzeln, 1867

= New Zealand rock wren =

Species of bird

The New Zealand rock wren (Xenicus gilviventris) is a small New Zealand wren (family Acanthisittidae) endemic to the South Island of New Zealand. Its Māori names include pīwauwau ("little complaining bird"), mātuitui, and tuke ("twitch", after its bobbing motion). Outside New Zealand it is sometimes known as the rockwren to distinguish it from the unrelated rock wren of North America.

The rock wren is currently restricted to alpine and subalpine areas of the South Island. It is a poor flier and highly terrestrial, feeding in low scrub, open scree, and rockfalls. The rock wren and rifleman are the only two surviving New Zealand wrens; the rock wren's closest relatives were the extinct stout-legged wrens, followed by the extinct bushwren. Its numbers are declining due to predation by introduced mammals.

== Description ==
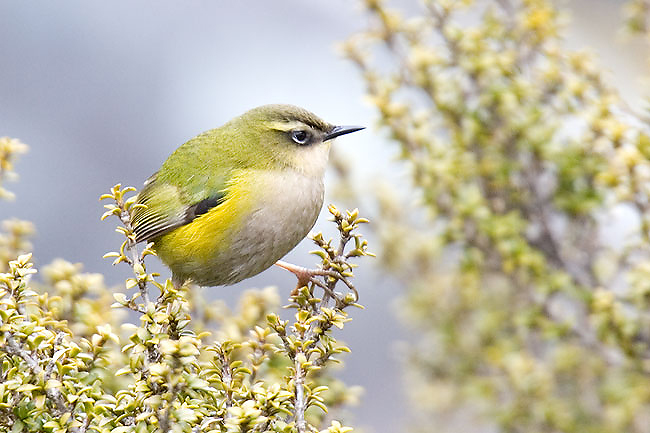
Xenicus gilviventris, showing distinctive green, yellow, and grey colouring.

The rock wren is a very small, almost tailless bird that prefers to hop and run on its long legs, and uses its rounded wings to fly only short distances. Its body length is typically about 9 centimetres (3.5 in). Males weigh around 16 g, females 20 g. Males are greenish with yellow flanks and a pale underside, females tend to be browner, although the degree of difference between the sexes varies geographically.

== Distribution and habitat ==
This species is currently confined to alpine and subalpine zones (900–2500 m altitude) of the Southern Alps, the Tasman Mountains of Northwest Nelson, and the Victoria Range of Westland, all in the South Island; it is New Zealand's only truly alpine bird. Subfossil remains suggest before Polynesian settlement it was also found in lowland forest. DNA from remains previously thought to be of North Island origin were compared with South Island wrens and found to be more closely related to the southern South Island clade. The misidentified North Island specimen is attributed to a mislabeling by the original collector. Its current alpine distribution is a habitat where few rodents can survive, full of sheltering rocks and dense vegetation.

Their preferred habitat is close to the treeline, amongst rockfalls, scree, fellfield, and low scrub. Rock wrens, unlike many alpine birds, do not migrate to lower elevations in winter; instead, they seem to shelter and forage in rockfalls beneath the snow layer.

== Behaviour ==
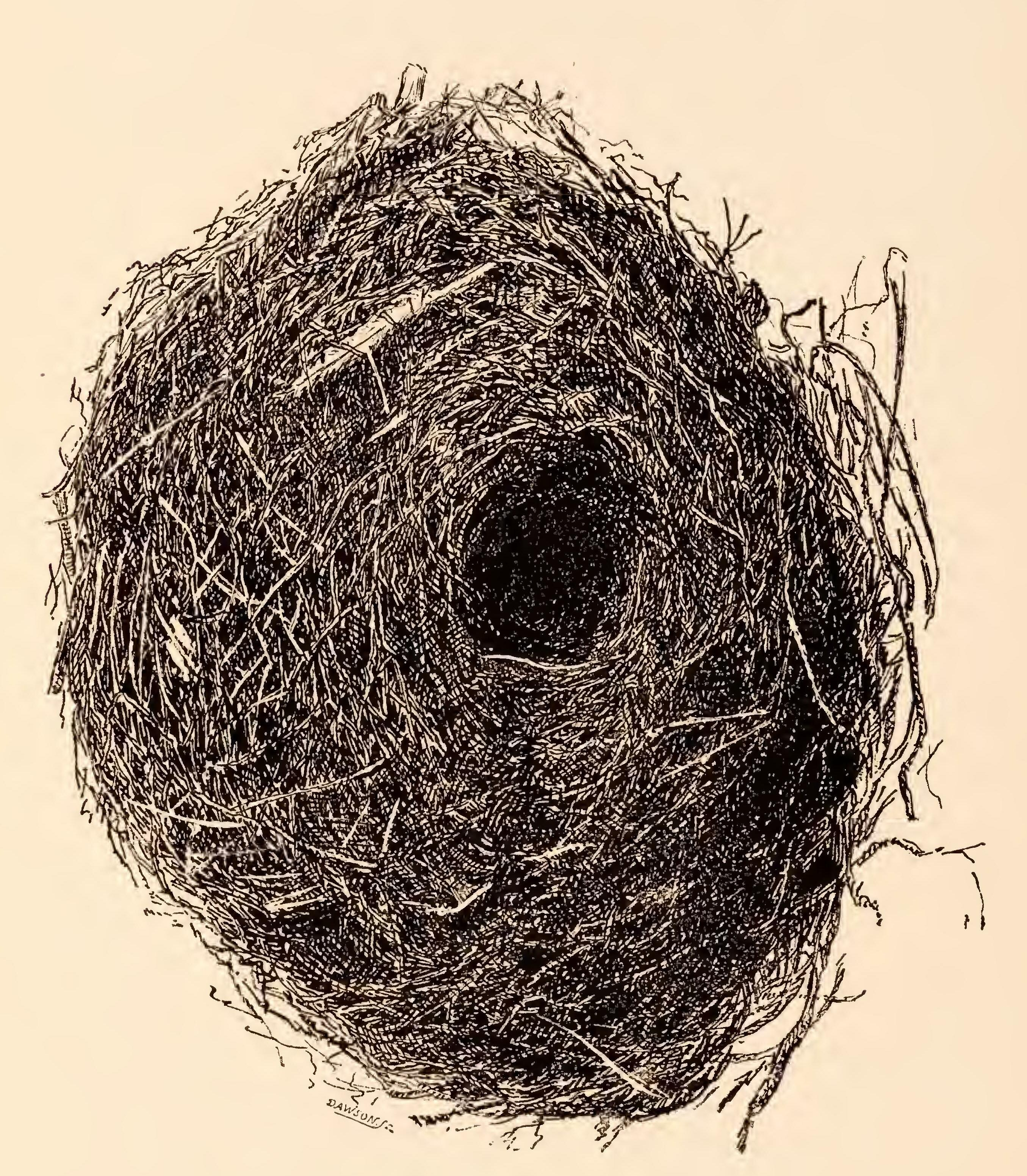
Rock wren nest

The rock wren is a poor flier, rarely flying more than 2 m off the ground or for distances of more than 30 m. It prefers to hop and run with distinctive bobbing and wing flicks. Its call is three high-pitched notes, and pairs sometimes duet.

Pairs maintain a year-round territory, and work together to build a large enclosed nest with an entrance tunnel. The nest is lined with feathers, often from other species of birds. Guthrie-Smith recovered 791 feathers from one nest in the 1930s, most from weka, but including some kiwi, kākāpō, kea, and kererū. Rock wrens are such assiduous collectors of feathers that their nests have been checked for kākāpō feathers, to determine if those endangered parrots are in the area. Around three eggs are laid in late spring and incubated for three weeks. Chicks take about 24 days to fledge and are fed for at least 4 weeks.

Rock wrens mostly eat invertebrates on the ground, but will sometimes take berries and seeds, and even nectar from flax flowers.

== Conservation ==
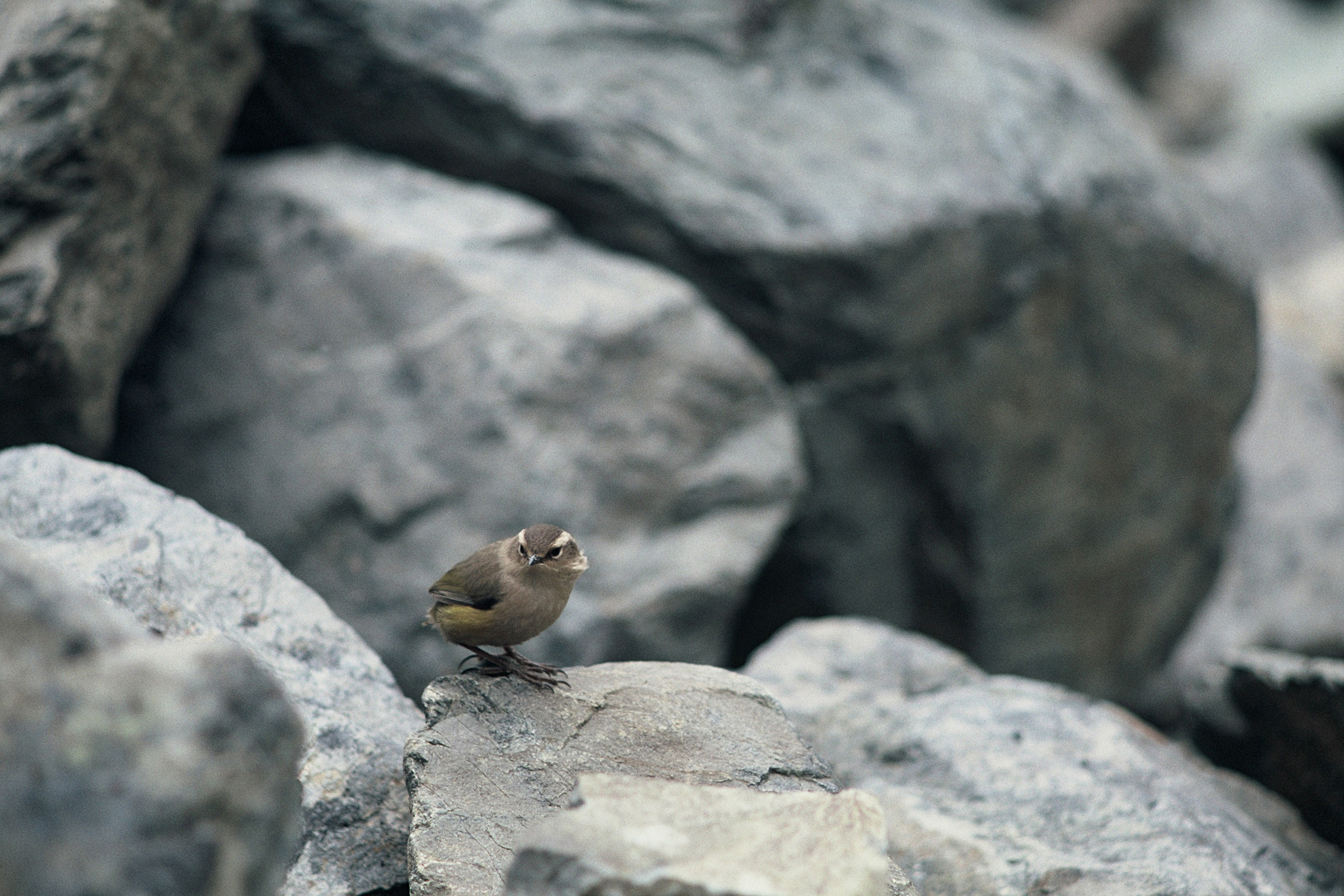
Rock wren in its preferred habitat

Writing in the 1930s, Herbert Guthrie-Smith declared,

Xenicus gilviventris, I am glad to think, is one of the species likely to survive changes that from the forester's and field naturalist's point of view have desolated New Zealand. The ravages wrought elsewhere by deer, rabbits, opossums, birds, and other imported vermin are unlikely to affect the welfare of the rock wren. Even weasels and rats — and I know they ascend to great heights — are hardly likely to draw sufficient recompense in prey from such unpeopled solitudes.… With cover and food supplies unmodified, the rock wren may be considered relatively safe.

This was not to be. Since European settlement in the South Island, rock wrens have become more patchy in their distribution; a study of over 2,100 sightings between 1912 and 2005 showed the area they inhabit had declined significantly since the 1980s. In the Murchison Mountains, rock wren showed a 44% decline in abundance over 20 years. The main threats to rock wrens are stoats and mice, which eat their eggs and young: A 2012–13 study in the upper Hollyford showed that most rock wren nests were being preyed upon by stoats. Predator trapping improved daily survival rates, egg hatching and fledgling rates of rock wrens. The long-term effect of climate change on their alpine habitat is also a threat, as warmer temperatures will allow rats to move higher into the mountains.

In 2008–2010, a total of 40 rock wrens were translocated to Secretary Island, an 8,140 ha (20,100 acres) rodent-free island in Fiordland, the third-tallest island in New Zealand. In 2010 a survey located 12 unbanded rock wrens, indicating they were successfully breeding.

The rock wren was voted New Zealand Bird of the Year for 2022.
