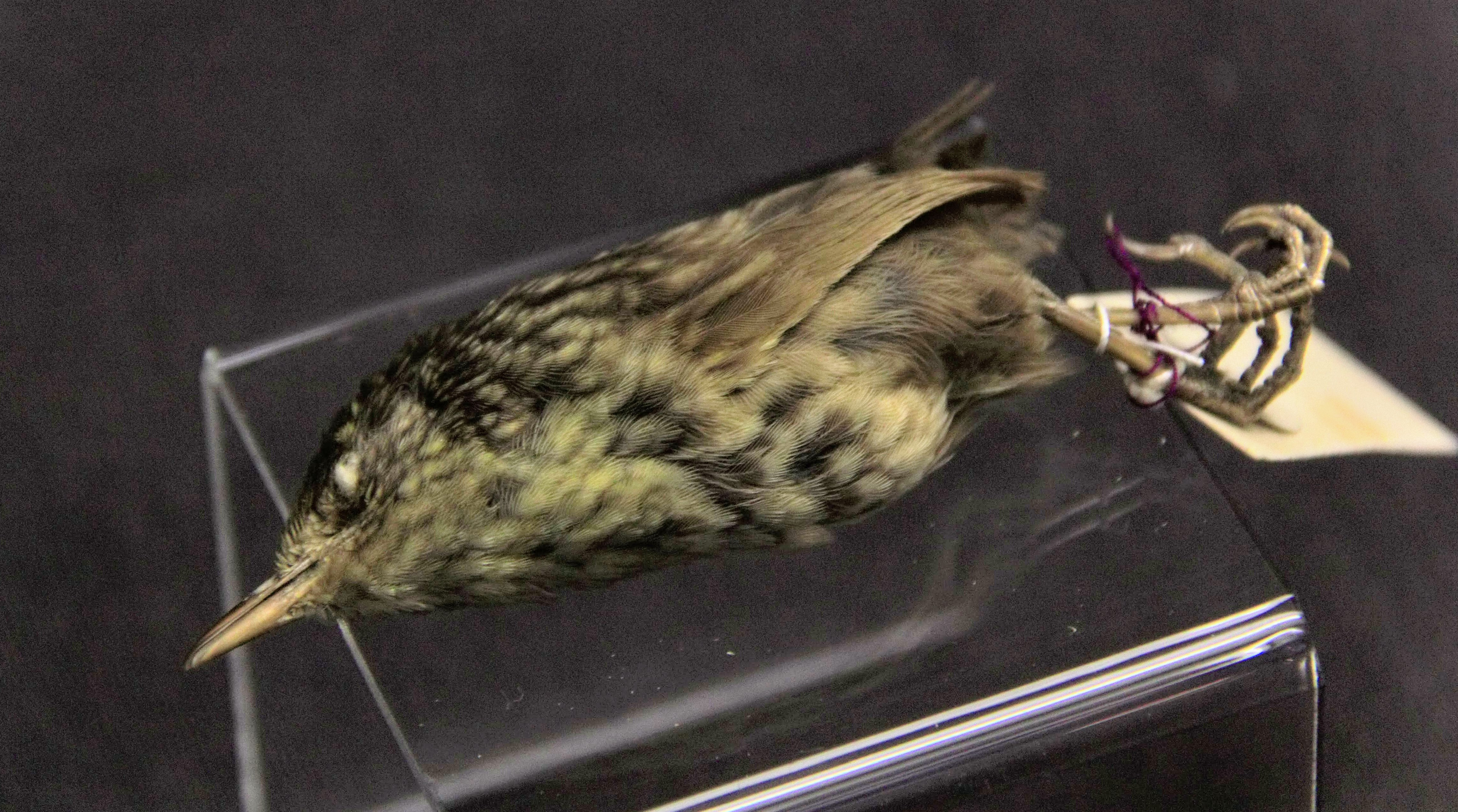
- Specimen at the Carnegie Museum of Natural History, Pittsburgh

Conservation status
- Extinct (1895?) (IUCN 3.1)

Scientific classification
- Kingdom: Animalia
- Phylum: Chordata
- Class: Aves
- Order: Passeriformes
- Family: Acanthisittidae
- Genus: †Traversia; Rothschild, 1894
- Species: †T. lyalli

Binomial name
- †Traversia lyalli Rothschild, 1894

Synonyms
- Xenicus lyalli

= Lyall's wren =

Extinct species of bird

Lyall's wren, the Stephens Island wren or the Stephens Island rockwren (Traversia lyalli) is an extinct species of small, flightless passerine bird belonging to the family Acanthisittidae, the New Zealand wrens. It was once found throughout New Zealand, but by the time of its discovery by scientists in 1894, it could only be found on Stephens Island in Cook Strait. Often claimed to be a species driven extinct by only a single individual animal (a lighthouse keeper's cat named Tibbles), it was actually predated upon by the numerous feral cats found throughout the island. (Note: Tibbles (and her unborn kittens) were believed to be the first cats brought to the island and most of the feral population was descended from them.) The wren was described almost simultaneously by both Walter Rothschild and Walter Buller; it became extinct shortly thereafter.

== Taxonomy ==
The bird's scientific name commemorates the assistant lighthouse keeper, David Lyall, who first brought the bird to the attention of science. It was described as a distinct genus, Traversia, in honour of naturalist and curio dealer Henry H. Travers, who procured many specimens from Lyall. Traversia is a member of the family Acanthisittidae, or the New Zealand wrens – which are not wrens but a similar-looking lineage of passerines, originating in the Oligocene, and the sister group to all other songbirds. DNA analysis has confirmed that T. lyalli, the only member of its genus, is the oldest and most distinct lineage in the Acanthisittidae.

== Description ==
Lyall's wren had olive-brown plumage with a yellow stripe through the eye. Its underside was grey in females and brownish-yellow in males and its body feathers were edged with brown.

Most distinctively, Lyall's wren was flightless, with a reduced keel on its breastbone and short rounded wings. It is the best known of the five flightless passerines (songbirds) known to science, all of which were inhabitants of islands and are now extinct. The others were three other New Zealand wrens (the long-billed wren and the two species of stout-legged wren) and the long-legged bunting from Tenerife, one of the Canary Islands, all of which were only recently discovered as fossils and became extinct in prehistoric times.

Living Lyall's wrens were seen only twice. The lighthouse keeper described the 'rock wren', as he called it, as almost nocturnal, "running around the rocks like a mouse and so quick in its movements that he could not get near enough to hit it with a stick or stone".

== Distribution ==
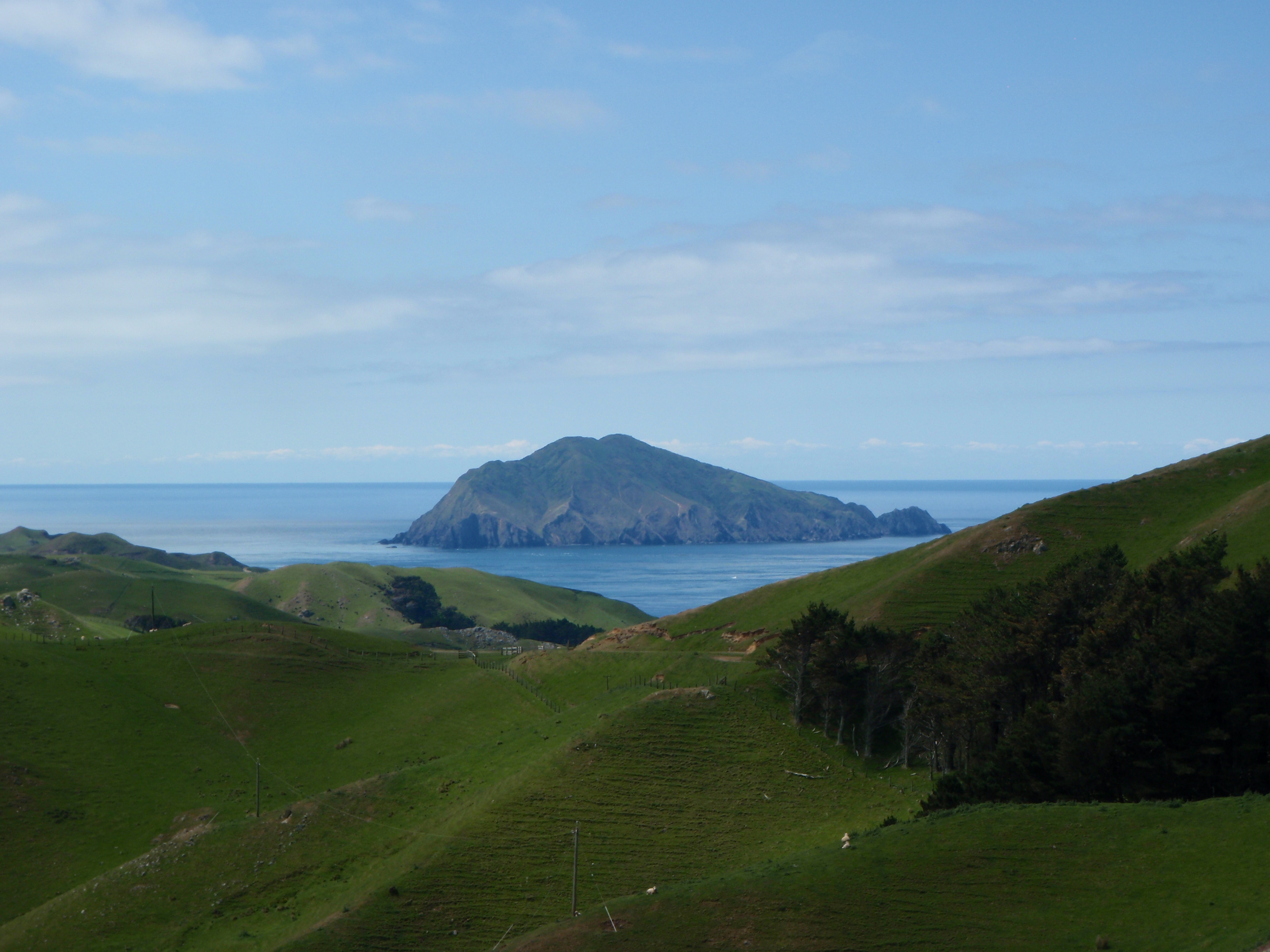
Stephens Island as seen from D'Urville Island

Historically, Lyall's wren was found only on Stephens Island. Prehistorically, it had been widespread throughout New Zealand before the land was settled by the Māori. Its bones can be found in caves and deposits left by laughing owls on both main islands. Its disappearance from the mainland was probably due to predation by the Polynesian rat or kiore (Rattus exulans), which had been introduced by the Māori. The presence of a flightless bird on an island 3.2 km from the mainland, along with Hamilton's frog (Leiopelma hamiltoni), which can be killed by exposure to salt water, may seem puzzling, but Stephens Island was connected to the rest of New Zealand during the last glaciation when sea levels were lower.

== Extinction ==
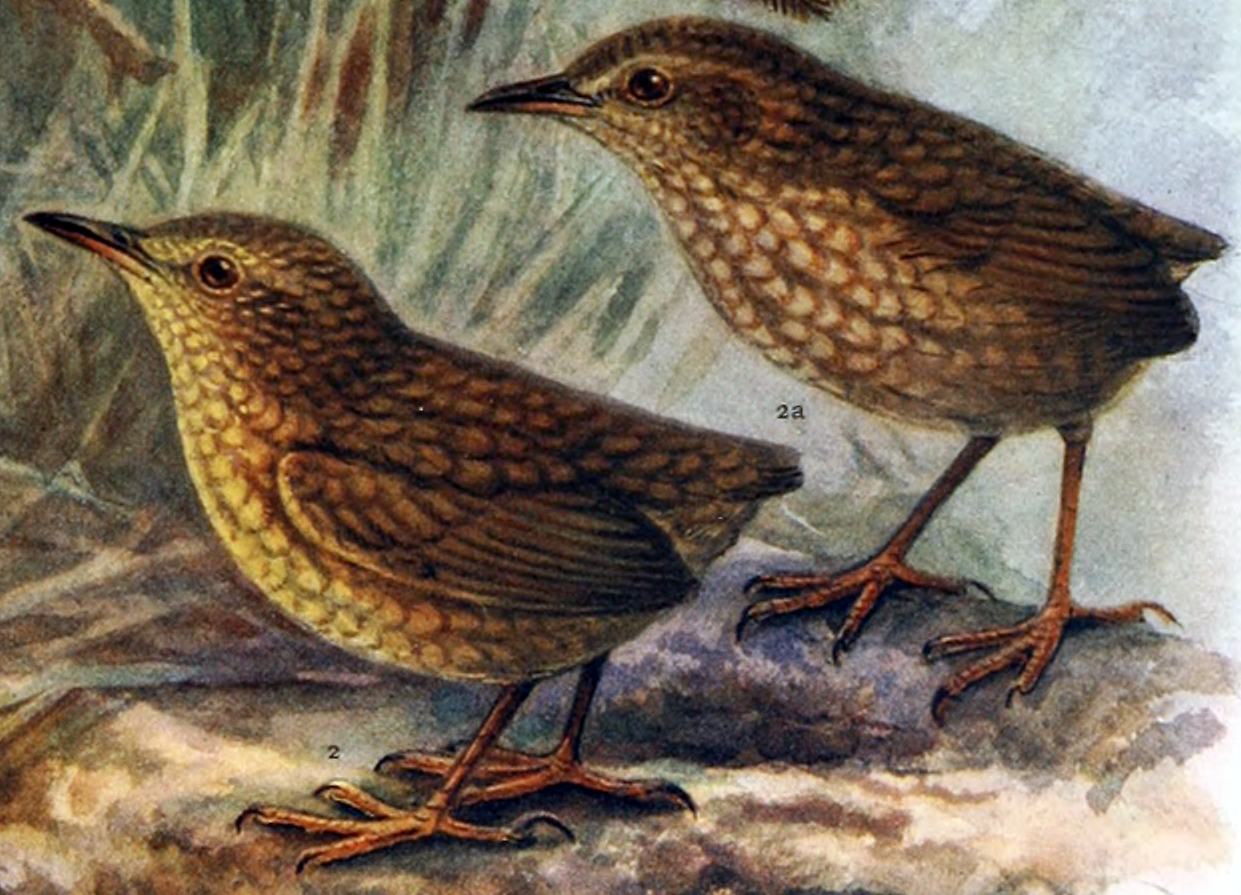
Lyall's wrens by John Keulemans

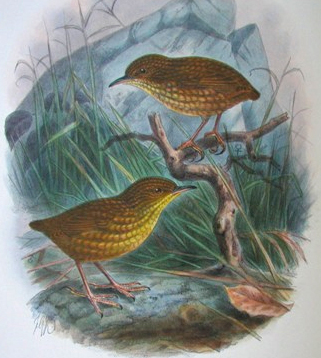
1905 illustration of a female and male, by Keulemans

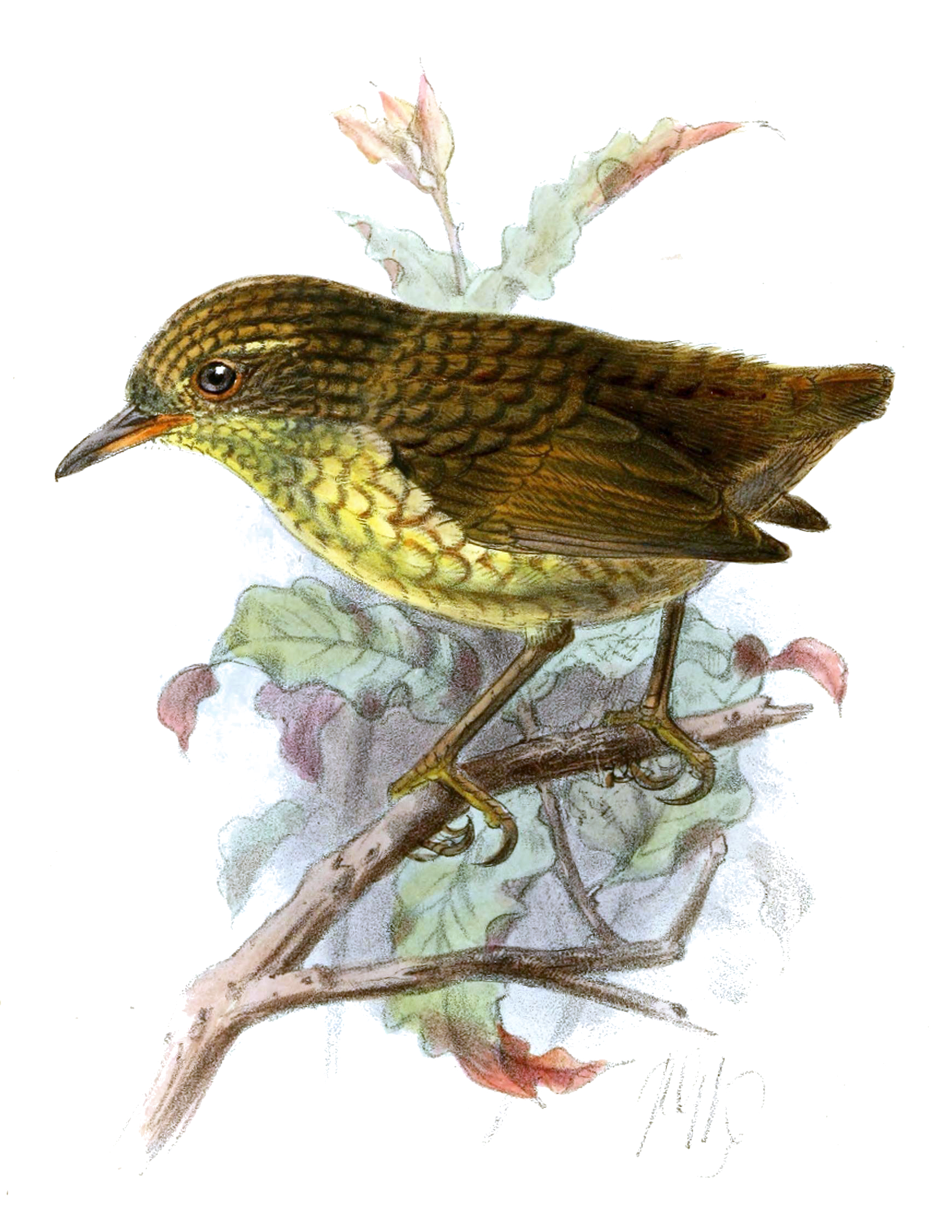
1895 illustration by Keulemans

Much of what is commonly assumed to be established knowledge about this species' extinction is either wrong or has been misinterpreted, starting with the account by Rothschild (1905) who claimed that a single cat had killed all of the birds. The research of Galbreath and Brown (2004) and Medway (2004) has uncovered much of the actual history of the bird during the short time that it was known to researchers, and concluded that the extinction of the bird was caused by hunting from an established population of feral cats, rather than from a single individual, and that it occurred over a period of a few years rather than over a single year as commonly recounted. Additional causes for the species' decline, such as hunting by human collectors and the clearing of native brush for construction, have also been debated.

- 1879
  - Early June?: A track to the proposed lighthouse site is cleared, starting the period of human activity on the island.
- 1881
  - 22 February: Marine engineer John Blackett surveys the site for the proposed lighthouse.
- 1891
  - April: Preparations for the construction of the lighthouse are begun by starting to build a tramway and a landing site for boats.
- 1892
  - April: Clearance of land for the lighthouse and the associated farm begins (three lighthouse keepers and their families, 17 people in total, would eventually be living on the island). The first report of the species was a note on the island's birdlife made by the construction worker F. W. Ingram, which mentions "two kinds of wren" (the other one was probably the rifleman).
- 1894
  - 29 January: The lighthouse commences working.
  - 17–20 February?: This is a likely date for introduction of cats to Stephens Island. What can be said with any certainty is that at some time in early 1894, a pregnant cat brought to the island escaped.
  - June?: A cat starts to bring carcasses of a species of small bird to the lighthouse keepers' housings. Lyall, who was interested in natural history, has one taken to Walter Buller by A. W. Bethune, second engineer on the government steamboat NZGSS Hinemoa.
  - Before 25 July?: The specimen reaches Buller, who at once recognises it as distinct species and prepares a scientific description, to be published in the journal Ibis. Bethune lends Buller the specimen so it can be sent to London for the famed artist John Gerrard Keulemans to make a lithograph plate to accompany the description.
  - Winter – early spring (Southern Hemisphere): Lyall finds several more specimens. He tells Buller about two more (but does not send them to him), and sells nine to Travers.
  - 9 October: Travers, who recognizes the commercial value of the birds, sidelines Buller and offers the birds to Walter Rothschild, who was wealthier and thus more likely to pay a high price, further piqueing Rothschild's interest by writing, "in a short time there will be [no "wrens"] left". Rothschild acquires his nine specimens.
  - 11/12 October: Edward Lukins makes a list of birds on Stephens Island; he apparently confuses the species with the South Island rockwren.
  - 19 December: Rothschild has quickly prepared a description of the bird, as Traversia lyalli, which is read by Ernst Hartert at the British Ornithologists' Club meeting. Philip Sclater, the Club's president and editor of the Ibis who knows of Buller's article in preparation, brings up the matter to Hartert, who says he cannot withdraw Rothschild's description without consent.
  - 29 December: Rothschild's description appears in the Bulletin of the British Ornithologists' Club.
- 1895
  - 24 January: Travers offers Rothschild a specimen preserved in alcohol (with viscera intact) for £5 (about £745.92 in 2024's money: U.K. House of Commons Library, 2003). Rothschild apparently agrees, but never receives the bird.
  - 4–9 February: Travers and three assistants searched the island for the bird, but found none.
  - Before 11 February?: Lyall writes to Buller: "...the cats have become wild and are making sad havoc among all the birds."
  - 7 March: Travers supplies Rothschild with some details of the bird's habits. To his knowledge, the species had only been seen alive twice until then. He has only been able to procure one additional specimen, brought in by the cat as the bird was dying, which also had been preserved in alcohol.
  - 16 March: The Christchurch newspaper The Press writes in an editorial:
    "there is very good reason to believe that the bird is no longer to be found on the island, and, as it is not known to exist anywhere else, it has apparently become quite extinct. This is probably a record performance in the way of extermination."
  - April: Buller's description of Xenicus insularis appears in the Ibis. The name is immediately reduced to a junior synonym. In the same issue, Rothschild's description is reprinted, with some additional remarks on the bird's apparent flightlessness. The race to describe the bird sparks much animosity between the two men and Buller never forgives Rothschild for beating him to it; for details and quotes, see Fuller (2000).
  - August: In a paper for the Wellington Philosophical Society, Buller speaks of a female bird he recently had examined. He later purchases this specimen.
  - 28 November: Travers informs Hartert that Lyall was not able to find more specimens during the winter and he believes the bird to be extinct. He offers two alcohol specimens for sale, for the price of £50 apiece (nearly £7,549.06 in 2024's money – to compare, the average lighthouse keeper's wage in 1895 was £140 a year, equivalent to £15,430.26 in 2024).
  - December: Travers tries another search for the bird, again without success.
- 1896
  - 13 May: Travers, unable to sell the birds at such a high price, now wants to sell his specimens for £12 each, about £1,338.15 in 2024's money.
  - June: Lyall gets assigned to another lighthouse and leaves Stephens Island.
  - 31 December – 7 January or longer: Hugo H. Schauinsland collects birds on Stephens Island, but cannot find many and no "wrens" at all. On 7 January, he collects the only specimen of the local South Island piopio acquired during his stay. It is the last record of that species.
- 1897
  - 31 July: The principal lighthouse keeper, Patrick Henaghan, requests shotguns and ammunition from the Marine Department to destroy the "large number of cats running wild on the island."
- 1898
  - 5 September: Travers writes James Hector that he has one more specimen available. At some time before this date, he had sold Buller one specimen for Henry Baker Tristram and claimed he had two additional ones.
  - 27 December: Travers writes to Hector, saying that Stephens Island "is now swarming with cats".
- 1899
  - 1 August: The new principal lighthouse keeper, Robert Cathcart, shoots over 100 feral cats since his arrival on 24 November 1898.
- 1901
  - Travers offers "his specimen of the Stephen's Island Wren" to the government for £35 (c. £3,902.95 in 2024); apparently, the bird is bought and deposited at the Colonial Museum with other skins. The collection is not reviewed until 1904, by which time a fifth has to be discarded due to insect damage. No record is made of the specimen since the offer, but the eventual sales price suggests it was among the collection deposited at the Colonial Museum.
- 1905
  - Travers sells one specimen to the Otago Museum.
  - Buller publishes his Supplement, in which he keeps using his name Xenicus insularis. He furthermore quotes an anonymous correspondent to The Press:
    "And we certainly think that it would be as well if the Marine Department, in sending lighthouse keepers to isolated islands where interesting specimens of native birds are known or believed to exist, were to see that they are not allowed to take any cats with them, even if mouse-traps have to be furnished at the cost of the state."
- 1907
  - Rothschild publishes his book, Extinct Birds. In a remarkable breach of nil nisi bonum (especially considering both men's social standing), it contains several acrimonious attacks on Buller, who had died the previous year.
- 1925
  - The last cats on the island were exterminated.

The role of additional causes to the species' extinction, such as habitat degradation and human collecting, have been a topic of debate. In 1990, the Checklist of the Birds of New Zealand settled on heavy collecting as a more likely primary cause for the species' extinction. Richard Holdaway and Trevor Worthy, in 2002, also judged that the species' extinction was caused by hunting from both cats and human collectors, alongside deforestation of the island to create the lighthouse complex and its attendant farm. Galbreath and Brown disagreed with these positions, arguing for insufficient evidence regarding whether Lyall's specimens were sourced from his own hunting rather than from individuals brought back by the cats and that the cryptic, nocturnal behavior of the birds making human capture difficult, although they acknowledged Henry Travers' "strenuous" attempts to capture birds himself, as well as citing contemporary accounts suggesting that the deforestation of the island was only completed after the species' extinction.

== The name "Tibbles" ==
The name, "Tibbles," has commonly been attributed to the cat owned by David Lyall. This does not appear to be historically grounded, as the known contemporary documents and records relevant to this story do not give a name for the lighthouse keeper's cat. The first known instance of that name being used in reference to David Lyall's cat comes much later in 1987, in the book, Extinct Birds (1987), by Errol Fuller:

"This single feline brought in some individuals that proved to belong to a hitherto undescribed species. After a while, the supply of birds apparently failed — at any rate the cat ceased to deliver its little victims into the lighthouse keeper's hands. Since no further examples have been seen or taken, it is assumed that Tibbles destroyed the entire population very shortly after finding it."

In 2026, this passage by Fuller was hypothesized to have been a passing filler name, not meant to be taken in a literal manner; similar to how one may use Fido as a filler name for a dog. Furthermore, it was also claimed that Fuller approved this understanding. In the time since this misunderstanding first took place, it has grown into a popular myth.

== Specimens ==
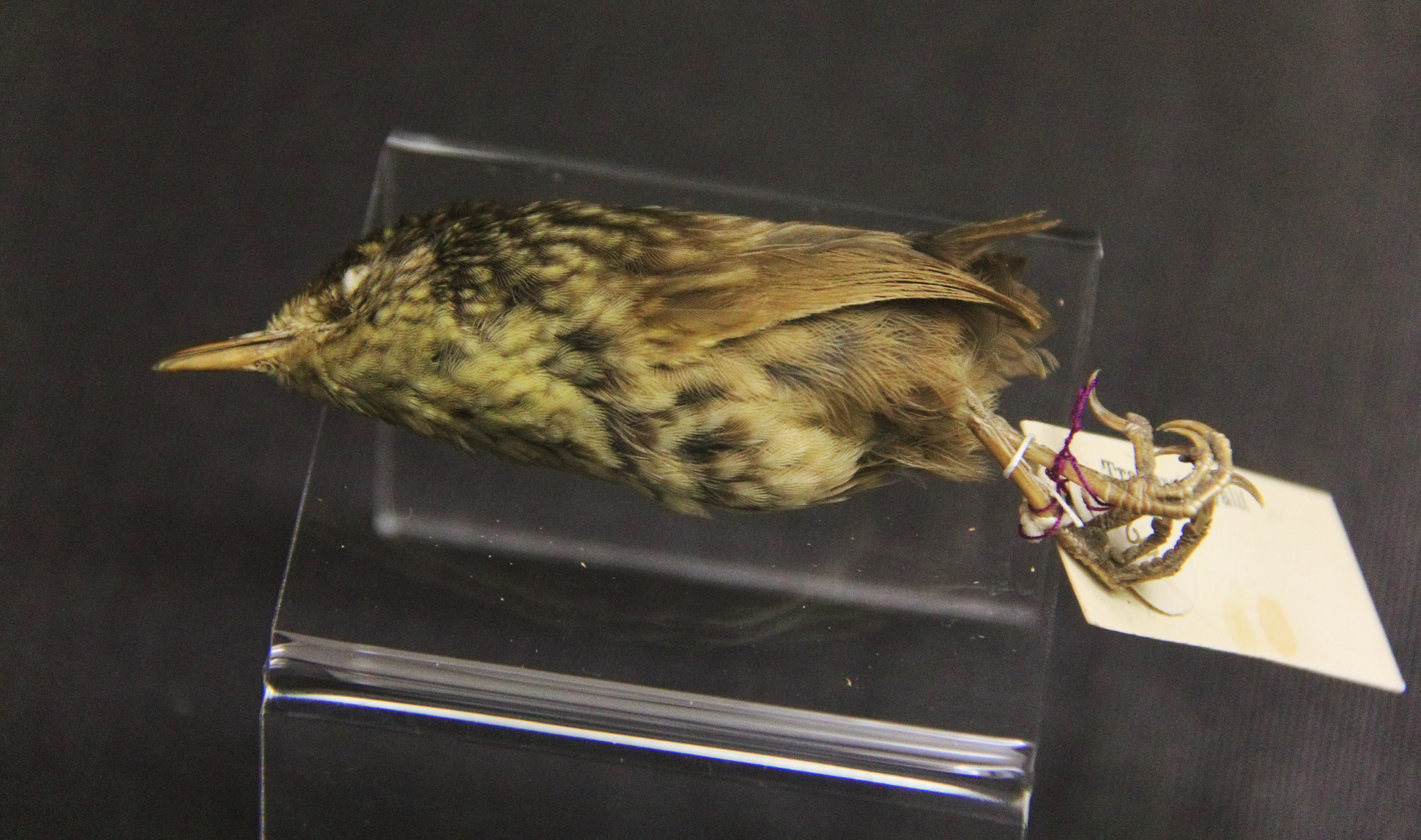
The Carnegie Museum specimen

About 16–18 specimens (excluding subfossil bones) are now known. They were collected by the lighthouse keeper's cat, by the keepers themselves and by professional collectors.

- Rothschild's specimens, all of which were collected between July and October 1894:
  - Natural History Museum, London: three (NHM 1895.10.17.13; 1939.12.9.76; 1939.12.9.77).
  - American Museum of Natural History, New York City: four (AMNH AM 554502; AM 554503; AM 554504; AM 554505).
  - Academy of Natural Sciences, Philadelphia: one (ANSP 108,631).
  - Harvard Museum of Comparative Zoology, Cambridge, Massachusetts: one (MCZ 249,400).
- Buller's specimens, collected at unknown dates between 1894 and 1899:
  - Carnegie Museum, Pittsburgh: one (CM P24639), labeled as female and dated 1894 in Buller's handwriting. Apart from the date discrepancy, it could be the bird Buller spoke of in August 1895; possibly the specimen was collected months before Buller had examined it. Alternatively, it could be the Bethune bird in case Buller kept it (he initially seems to believe it to be a female), as Rothschild (1907) believed. DNA analysis could, at least, clarify the bird's sex.
  - Canterbury Museum, Christchurch: AV917 and AV918, a pair from the collection of Buller's son, dated 1899. They were acquired between late 1896 and 1899, but may have been collected before that date.
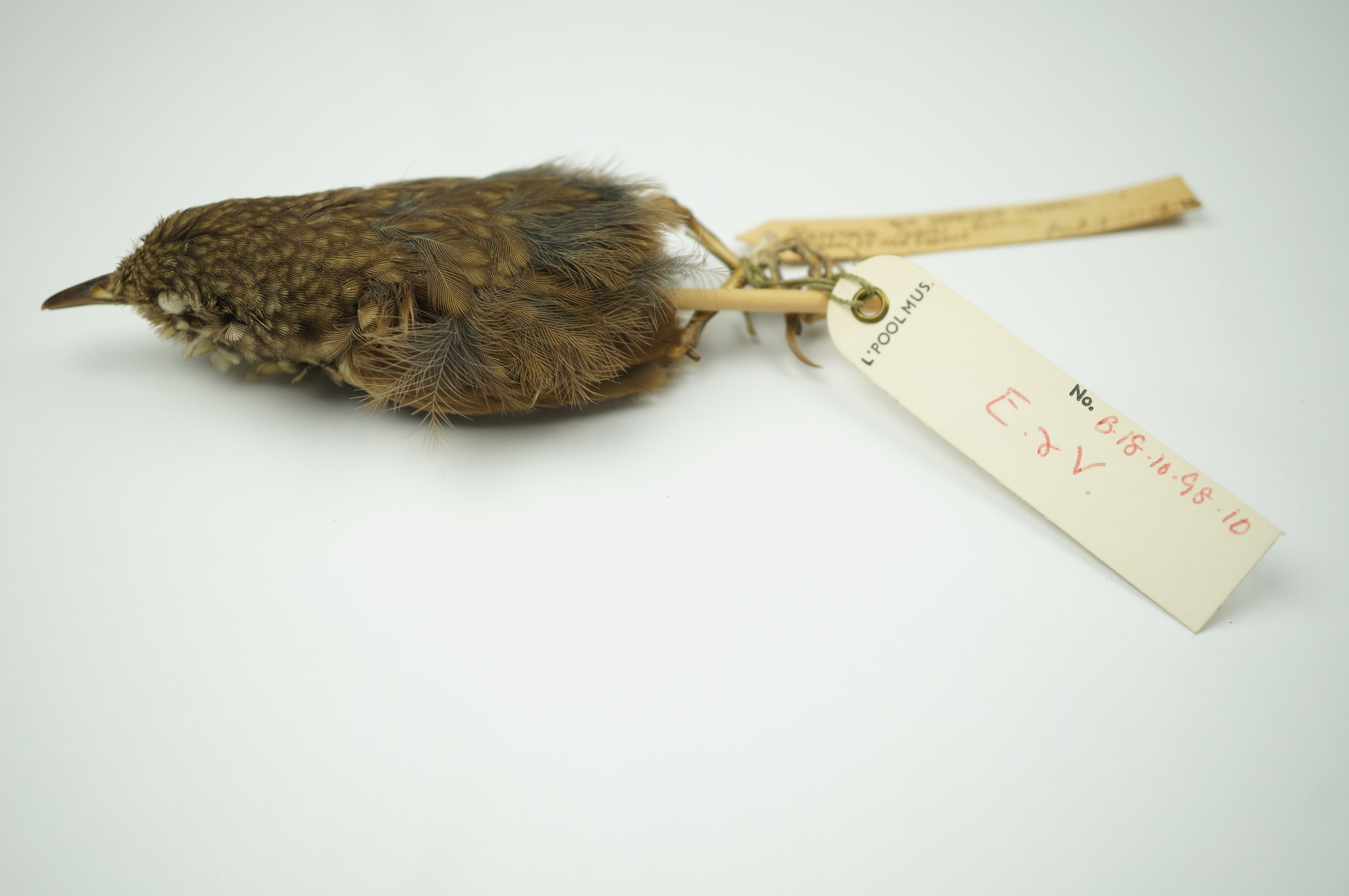
- Stephens Island wren (Traversia lyalli) specimen in World Museum, National Museums Liverpool
  World Museum, National Museums Liverpool: One confirmed (NML-VZ B.18.10.98.10). Purchased by Buller from Travers for Tristram, probably after late 1896 (but may have been collected earlier). Sold to the museum in October 1898.
- Museum of New Zealand Te Papa Tongarewa, Wellington: one (OR.005098) mounted specimen without data; may be Travers' specimen sold in 1901 or another one. This photograph by Dr Paddy Ryan shows the Te Papa specimen and another one – possibly the Otago Museum bird, but the matter is not clear.
- Otago Museum, Dunedin: one, but two catalog numbers (AV739 and AV7577) exist. It is not clear whether they represent re-cataloguing of the one specimen sold by Travers in 1905, or whether a specimen was lost.
- Unaccounted for (all collected in 1894 or very early in 1895):
  - Bethune's specimen: lent to Buller for the description, apparently later given back. If so, it was probably deposited at the Colonial Museum (now part of Te Papa) for safekeeping between 1895 and 1897, or
  - Buller's female mentioned in August 1895, or even both (if neither is CM P24639).
  - Two of Lyall's first three specimens (one was given to Bethune) remain unaccounted for. They may be part of Rothschild's nine, or Buller's three. They were not in Buller's possession as of early February 1895.
  - Travers' "lost" specimen referred to in January 1895. It is not certain that this specimen was indeed lost; it may have been one of the alcohol-preserved specimens mentioned in November 1895 and Travers may simply have withheld it so he could fetch a higher price as the bird became extinct.

== In the media ==
- Lyall's wren was featured in the episode "Strange Islands" of the documentary series South Pacific that originally aired on 13 June 2009.
- Lyall's wren was featured in an episode of the BBC television panel quiz show QI (Season B, episode 2) as the 'final thought' by host Stephen Fry.

== See also ==
- New Zealand wren
- Cats in New Zealand
