= Stephens Island Lighthouse =

Stephens Island / Takapourewa Lighthouse
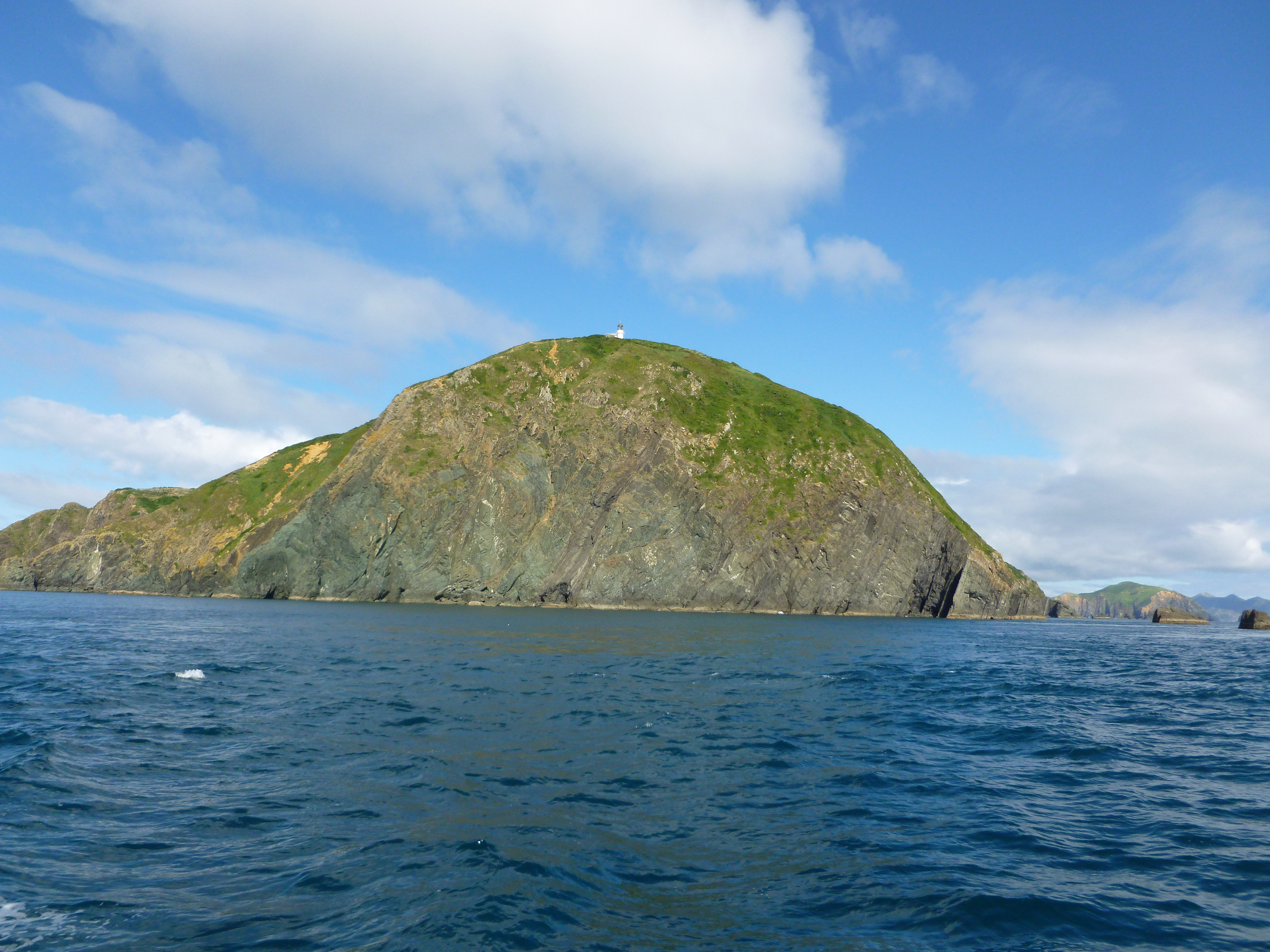
- Location: Northeast of the much larger D'Urville Island South Island New Zealand
- Coordinates: 40°39′56″S 174°00′00″E

Tower
- Constructed: 1894
- Construction: White cast iron tower
- Automated: 1989
- Height: 15 metres (49 ft)
- Markings: White
- Power source: solar power

Light
- First lit: 1894
- Focal height: 183 metres (600 ft)
- Light source: 50 watt tungsten halogen bulb
- Range: 18 nautical miles (33 km; 21 mi)
- Characteristic: Flashes white once every six seconds

The Stephens Island / Takapourewa lighthouse is one of New Zealand's most powerful lights with a range of 18 nautical miles (33 km; 21 mi). Perched 183 metres (600 ft) up, on top of Stephens Island, it guards Cook Strait and Tasman Bay / Te Tai-o-Aorere, at the top of the South Island / Te Wai Pounamu.The light flashes white once every six seconds from a white cast iron tower.

The light is operated remotely from Maritime New Zealand's Wellington office. It was first lit on 29 January 1894, and did not become automated until 31 March 1989, one of the last in New Zealand to be automated.

Entry to the site and tower is by permit only, because it is part of the Stephens Island Nature Reserve, managed by the Department of Conservation. Today it is home to tuatara, no people and an urban myth about a cat named Tibbles.

== Early history ==
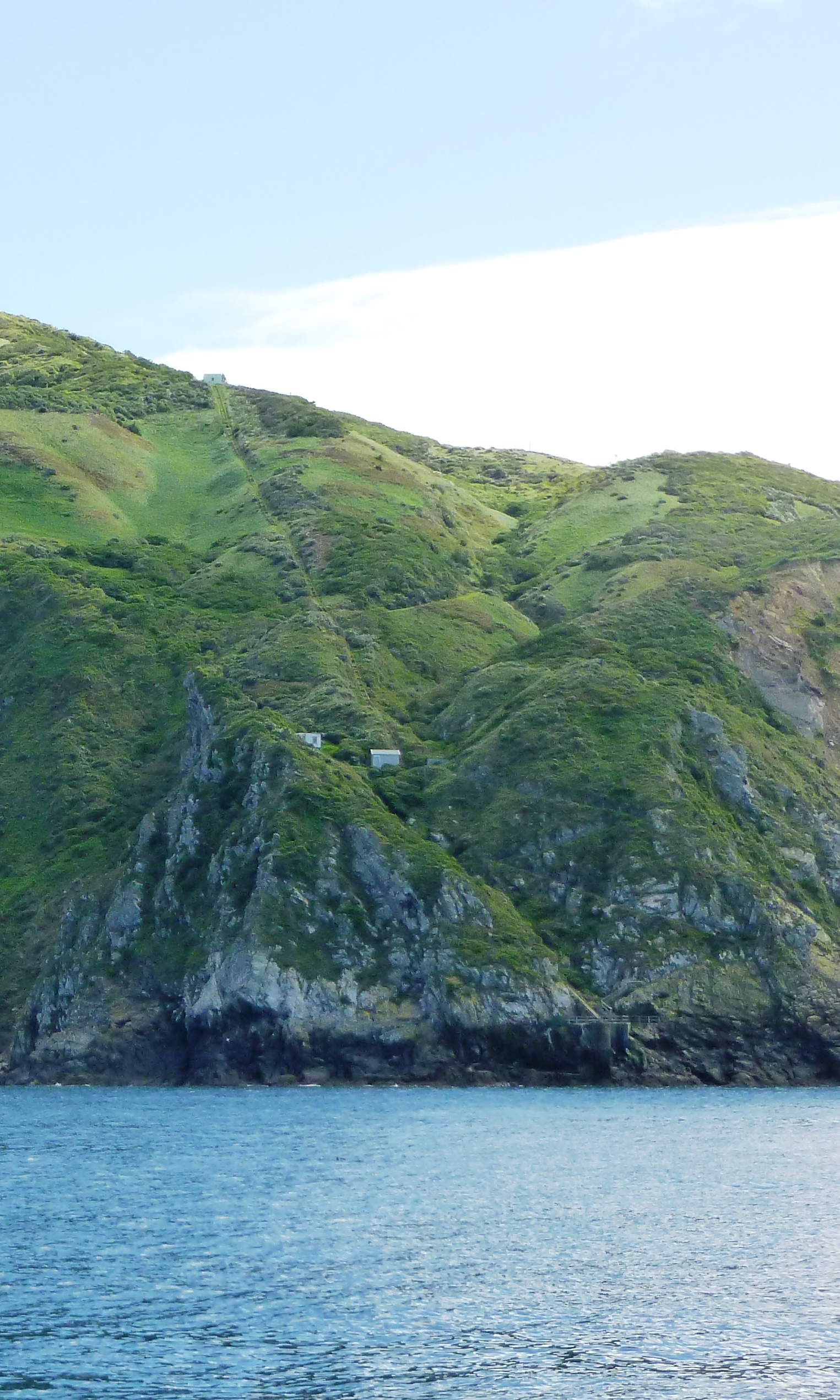
The scar of the vertical tramway 126 years after construction

The Māori name for the island, Takapourewa, originates from it once being covered in the takapou trees. Takapou – more commonly known as matipo – trees grew right down to the water's edge, giving the effect that the island floated in the sea. The Maori word for float is rewa; hence, Takapou-rewa.

In 1770, Captain James Cook sailed past, and named the island after Sir Philip Stephens, the Secretary of the British Admiralty Board.

As the new colony grew in the 1850s, the island was identified as an obvious location for one of a scheme of lighthouses to be erected on significant headlands along New Zealand's 15,000 kilometres (9,300 mi) long coastline. The site was first proposed in 1854, and again in 1888 after the bark Weathersfield was shipwrecked nearby. Several factors, including remoteness, turbulent Cook Strait and steep terrain, made it difficult and hazardous to build. In addition, it is the highest elevation above sea level of any lighthouse in New Zealand. Before the lighthouse and associated dwellings could be built, a work party arrived in 1891 to construct a boat landing ledge and vertical tramway up the precipitous cliffs.

The original light components were sourced from Edinburgh and France. The eventual £9,349 cost was twice the price of many other New Zealand lighthouses. Back then, its five wick paraffin lamps made it the brightest lighthouse in New Zealand.

The native māpou (red matipo) was cleared to make way for sheep and cattle, and the vertical tramway. Habitat destruction and feral cats are blamed for the silencing of the birdsong of the native tūī, bellbird and tīeke. By way of contrast, when Edward Lukins, a collector of natural history specimens, visited shortly after the occupation, he recorded 31 species of birds, along with two species of land snails and four of lizards.

For the keepers and their families it was a lonely and hard posting, with a perpendicular climb from boat to home. Besides keeping the light lit, they acted as wildlife rangers and coast watchers during the second World War. Isolation made illness a serious risk. For example, in May 1909, a doctor and nurse were urgently sent out from Wellington to stifle an outbreak of scarlet fever.

On a brighter note, in 1947, the lighthouse featured on a four pence postage stamp. At one time, there were three keepers and small school. In the mid-1960s, Jeanette Aplin and her family lived on the island for six years. She tells her story in The lighthouse keeper's wife, a tale of self-discovery, small domestic details of a lighthouse community and her zest for isolation from everyday society.
