= Kuiornis =

Scientific classification
- Kingdom: Animalia
- Phylum: Chordata
- Class: Aves
- Order: Passeriformes
- Family: Acanthisittidae
- Genus: †Kuiornis; Worthy et al., 2010
- Species: †K. indicator

Binomial name
- †Kuiornis indicator Worthy et al., 2010

Genus of birds

Kuiornis indicator is an extinct New Zealand wren (Acanthisittidae) known from the early Miocene (19–16 million years ago) St Bathans fauna in Central Otago. It is known from a holotype proximal right tarsometatarsus (NMNZ S.50929). Amongst acanthisittids it is most closely related to the living rifleman.
