= Stephens Island (New Zealand) =

Island of the Marlborough Sounds, New Zealand

Takapourewa (Māori)
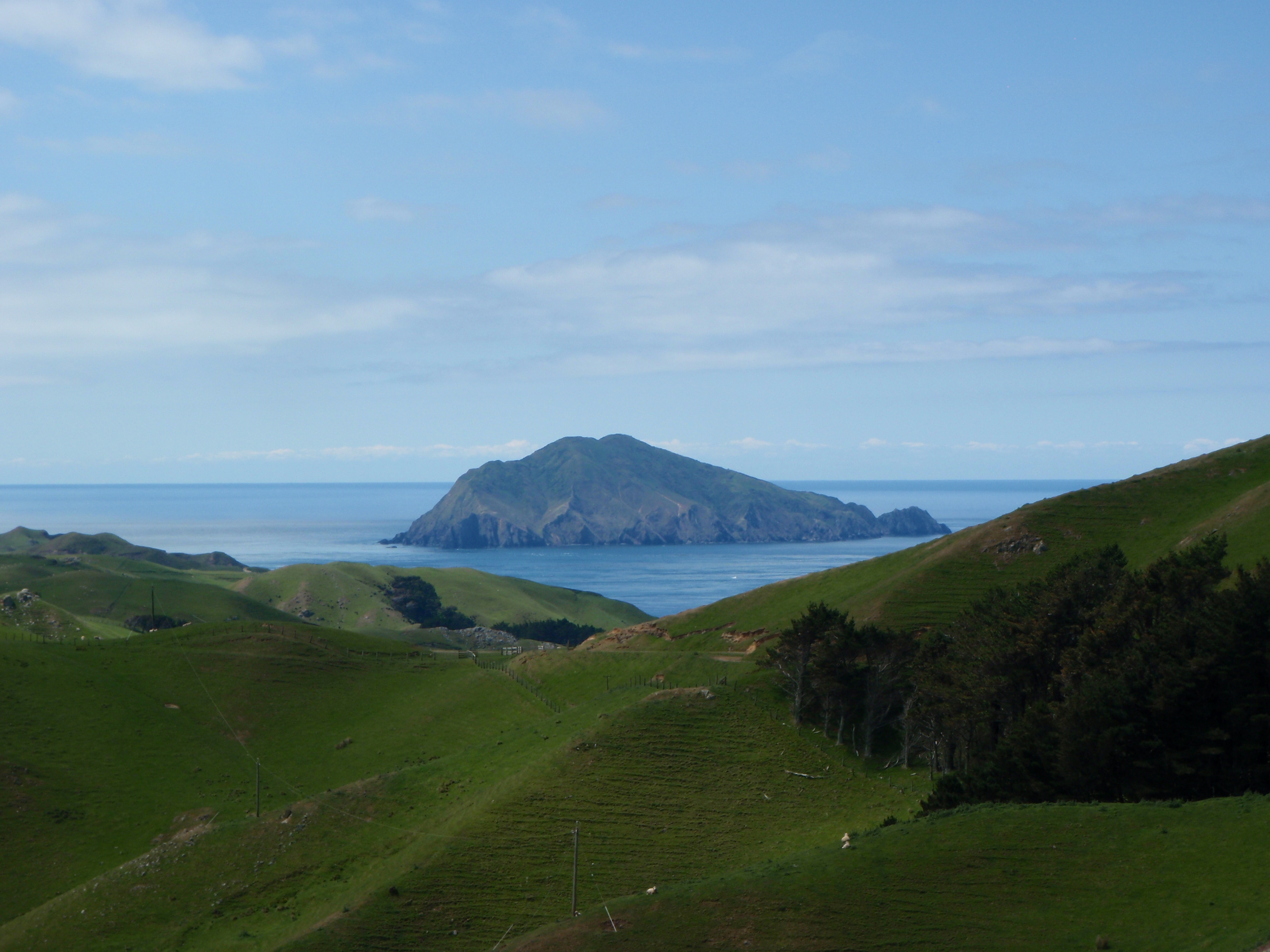
- Stephens Island as seen from D'Urville Island

- Location within New Zealand

Geography
- Location: Marlborough Sounds
- Coordinates: 40°40′S 174°00′E
- Area: 1.5 km^{2} (0.58 sq mi)
- Highest elevation: 283 m (928 ft)

Administration
- New Zealand

Demographics
- Population: 0

Stephens Island (Māori: Takapourewa) is at the northernmost tip of the Marlborough Sounds in the South Island of New Zealand. It lies two kilometres to the northeast of Cape Stephens, the northernmost point of D'Urville Island. The island is 1.5 square kilometres (0.58 square miles) in size, and rises 283 metres (928 ft) high from the sea.

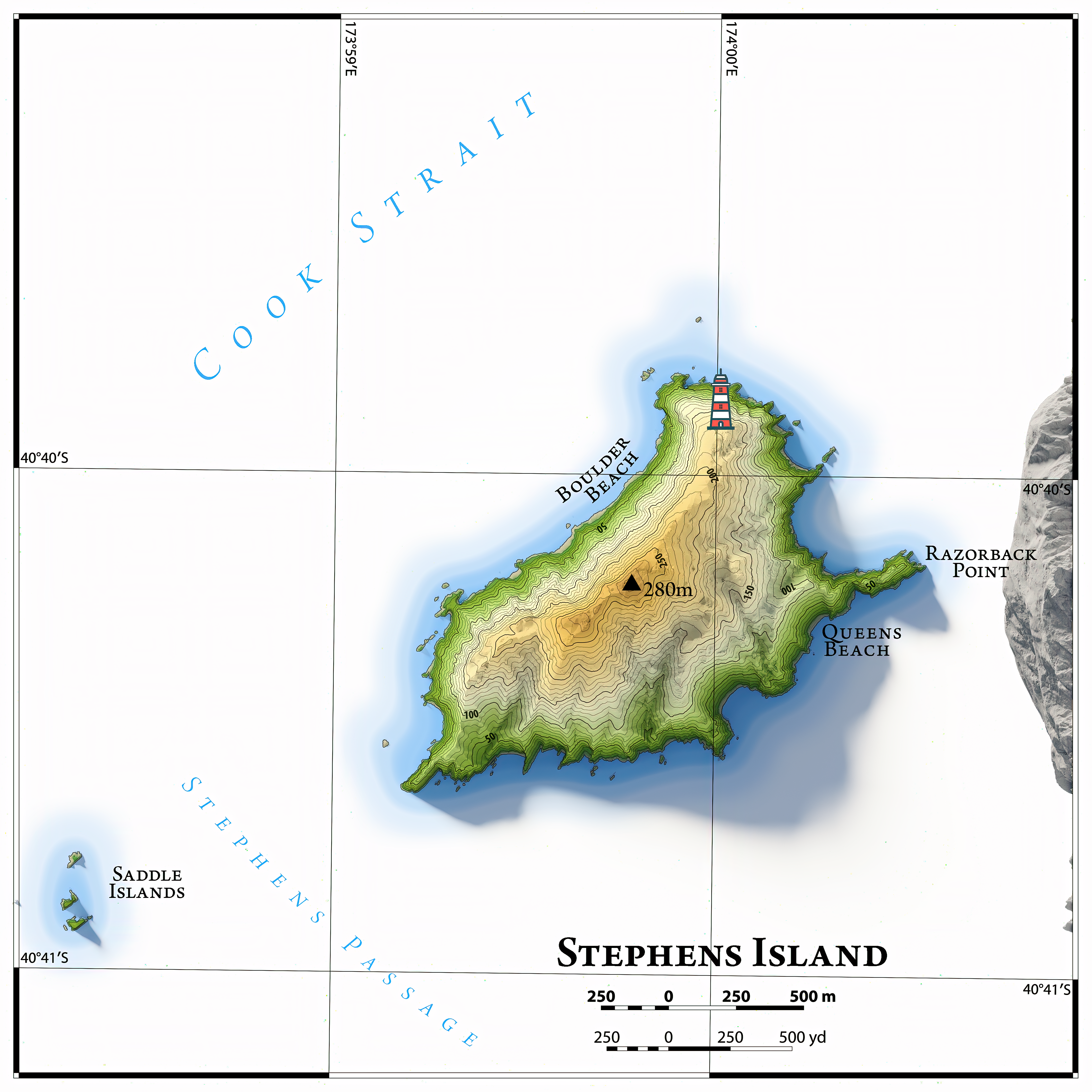
Topographic map of Stephens Island

== History ==
The island was owned by the Ngāti Koata iwi but was taken by the government to build a lighthouse in 1891. The Māori called it Takapourewa ("around the tower") but explorer Captain Cook renamed it Stephens Island in 1770 after Sir Philip Stephens, Secretary of the Admiralty.

The island featured in local mythos as the place where a local lighthouse keeper's cat, named Tibbles, was claimed to have caused the extinction of Lyall's wren in 1894. However, this belief was an erroneous urban legend. While this cat did kill one of the last birds seen, a few more specimens were obtained in the following years, by which time the island also hosted numerous feral cats, and the island was only the last refuge of the bird, which had become extinct on the mainland many centuries earlier due to Polynesian rat predation.

Farming and grazing reduced the island's original vegetation cover by around 90%, before it was made a wildlife sanctuary in 1966 and a nature reserve in 1997. In 2012 the Treaty of Waitangi settlement between Ngāti Koata and the New Zealand Government required joint management by Ngāti Koata and the Department of Conservation.

== Conservation ==
Today, the best known resident of Stephens Island is the tuatara. The island is a sanctuary for this rare order of reptile which is now extinct on the mainland, except in tightly controlled reserves including ecological islands.

Stephens Island is internationally important for nature conservation. While most attention has focused on the tuatara, significant and unique factors include:

- Endemic species – those found nowhere else, either because they evolved here or because they have become extinct everywhere else – such as Hamilton's Frog, perhaps the rarest frog in the world, and the Ngaio weevil, a large flightless Weevil
- Unusual species such as the tuatara (Sphenodon punctatus), which is the sole survivor of a group of reptiles that otherwise appears to have been extinct elsewhere in the world for more than 60 million years
- Rare species – such as the Stephen's Island gecko and Cook Strait click beetle that are only found in a handful of other places, and for which Stephens Island is a stronghold
- Common species in unusual abundance – such as the more than one million seabirds, vast numbers of wētā and darkling beetles and many more
- Stephens Island is a part of a complex ecosystem that includes a vast area of ocean. An enormous number of seabirds link this small (154 ha) island to a vast marine ecosystem. The sea provides nutrients, the seabirds carry these to the island and Takapourewa provides a sanctuary for nesting birds, free of mammalian land predators.

== Geography ==
In natural character, Stephens Island is a rugged landmass dominated by maritime influences. Visually the island is connected to the adjacent larger D'Urville Island, and Stephens Island is the largest of the family of islands, islets and rock stacks that characterise this southwestern side of the Cook Strait. Although uninhabited, the island has been extensively modified by land clearance and farming, but retains much of its wild natural character. From sea level the lighthouse is a prominent visual feature, while from the air the cluster of buildings and farmed landscape are obvious.

The surrounding sea is rich with marine life, albeit strongly modified and depleted by fishing, and historically by hunting of whales and seals. The island overlooks one of the great whale migration routes, most notably for humpback whales. Marine mammals such as New Zealand fur seals and various dolphin species are seen around the island.

This is an area of strong winds (mean annual wind speed 14 knots or 26 kilometres per hour or 16 miles per hour), strong currents and broken restless seas. The island also harbours strong gradations of weather between the often cloud-covered summit and the wave-lashed shores. There are also distinct differences between the relatively more exposed western and the less exposed eastern shores. Rainfall averages a modest 800 mm (31.5 in).

== Geology ==
Stephens Island is characterised by the Stephens Formation, a geological unit comprising 1100 meters of southeast-dipping sedimentary rocks ranging from mudstone with limestone lenses to volcanogenic sandstone and conglomerate. As the youngest formation within the Maitai Group, these rocks constitute the most northerly exposure of the Nelson Regional Syncline, displaying an overturned orientation on the syncline's eastern limb. Indurated with widespread metamorphic prehnite, pumpellyite, and lawsonite, the formation is subdivided into Queens Beach, Incline, Takapourewa, and Titapua Members, with no discernible top or bottom boundaries. Notably, the oldest rocks, found in the Queens Beach Member, consist of a 150-meter layer of rounded cobble conglomerate enclosing angular blocks of coarse volcanogenic sandstone. Within one such block, measuring 4 meters in length and up to 1.5 meters in thickness, a diverse but moderately preserved marine fossil assemblage dominated by brachiopods and pectinid bivalves of Late Permian age is identified. The contemporaneous formation of the fossiliferous sandstone and conglomerate suggests a Late Permian age, although the potential for a younger (Triassic) age cannot be ruled out. Additionally, Late Quaternary deposits, including loess and windblown sand, are present in localized areas.

== Climate ==
Climate data for Stephens Island (1981–2010)
Month	Jan	Feb	Mar	Apr	May	Jun	Jul	Aug	Sep	Oct	Nov	Dec	Year
Mean daily maximum °C (°F)	18.8 (65.8)	19.1 (66.4)	18.1 (64.6)	16.0 (60.8)	14.1 (57.4)	12.1 (53.8)	11.2 (52.2)	11.7 (53.1)	12.8 (55.0)	13.9 (57.0)	15.3 (59.5)	17.2 (63.0)	15.0 (59.0)
Daily mean °C (°F)	16.0 (60.8)	16.5 (61.7)	15.5 (59.9)	13.7 (56.7)	11.9 (53.4)	10.1 (50.2)	9.2 (48.6)	9.5 (49.1)	10.5 (50.9)	11.4 (52.5)	12.6 (54.7)	14.5 (58.1)	12.6 (54.7)
Mean daily minimum °C (°F)	13.3 (55.9)	13.8 (56.8)	12.9 (55.2)	11.4 (52.5)	9.8 (49.6)	8.1 (46.6)	7.1 (44.8)	7.3 (45.1)	8.1 (46.6)	9.0 (48.2)	10.0 (50.0)	11.8 (53.2)	10.2 (50.4)
Average rainfall mm (inches)	61 (2.4)	39 (1.5)	63 (2.5)	67 (2.6)	81 (3.2)	74 (2.9)	86 (3.4)	79 (3.1)	65 (2.6)	71 (2.8)	62 (2.4)	61 (2.4)	809 (31.8)
Source: NIWA (rain 1961–1990)

== See also ==
- Cats in New Zealand
- List of islands of New Zealand
- List of islands
- Desert island
