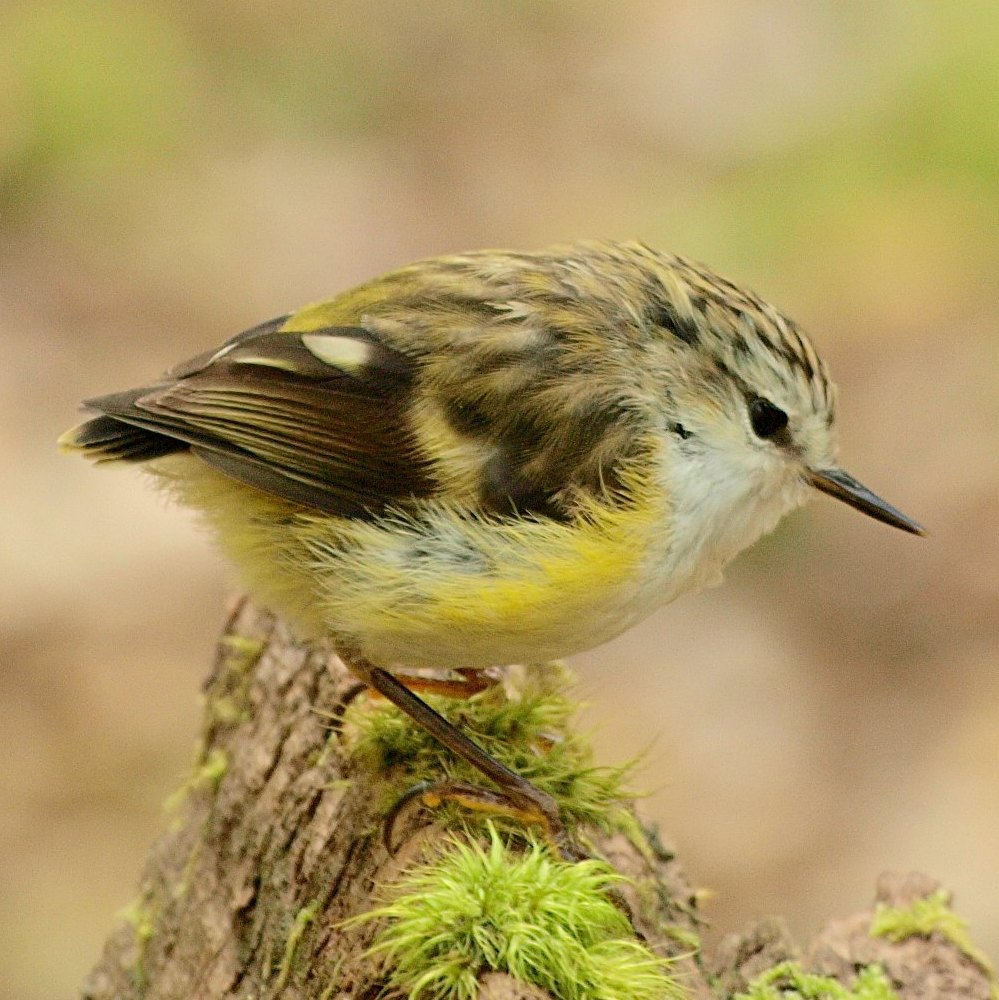
- Female

Conservation status
- Least Concern (IUCN 3.1)

Scientific classification
- Kingdom: Animalia
- Phylum: Chordata
- Class: Aves
- Order: Passeriformes
- Family: Acanthisittidae
- Genus: Acanthisitta; Lafresnaye, 1842
- Species: A. chloris

Binomial name
- Acanthisitta chloris (Sparrman, 1787)

Subspecies
- A. c. granti – Mathews & Iredale, 1913; A. c. chloris – (Sparrman, 1787)

= Rifleman (bird) =

Species of bird

The rifleman (Acanthisitta chloris) (Māori: titipounamu or tītitipounamu) is a small insectivorous passerine bird that is endemic to New Zealand. It belongs to the family Acanthisittidae, also known as the New Zealand wrens, of which it is one of only two surviving species. The rifleman resembles a wren in form, but is not related to the family of true wrens, Troglodytidae, nor the fairy-wrens of Australia.

== Taxonomy ==
The rifleman was described by Anders Sparrman in 1787 based on a bird collected in Queen Charlotte Sound in the Marlborough Sounds of New Zealand's South Island. He originally placed it in the nuthatch genus Sitta. Frédéric de Lafresnaye placed it in its own monotypic genus Acanthisitta in 1842. The name Acanthisitta is a portmanteau of the thornbill genus Acanthiza and the genus Sitta.

The rifleman is named after a colonial New Zealand regiment because its plumage drew similarities with the military uniform of a rifleman.

== Description ==
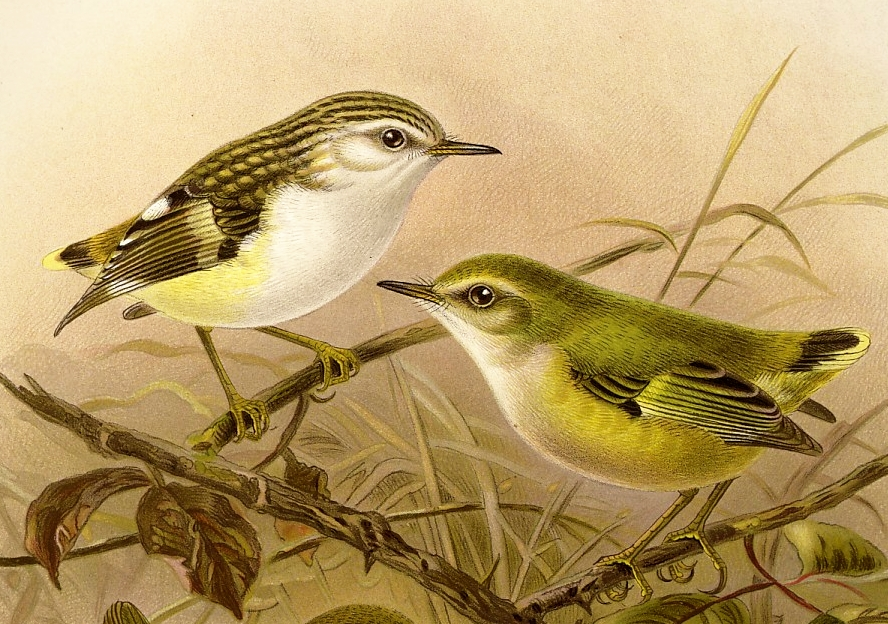
Female (L) and Male (R) rifleman – A History of the Birds of New Zealand, Buller, 1888

The rifleman is New Zealand's smallest endemic bird, with fully grown adults reaching around 7 to 9 cm (2.8–3.5 in) in length. Male birds typically weigh around 6 g (0.21 oz), females 7 g (0.25 oz). The bill of the female is also longer, as is its hind claw. The difference in between the sexes may be ecological in its origin, reflecting different foraging niches the two sexes have during times when they have high energy demands (feeding chicks). The male rifleman is bright green above, with a yellow-green rump. The wings are black, green and white with a yellow band across the flight feathers. The tail is black with a whitish tip. The throat, breast and belly are white, sometimes with a yellow wash, and the flanks are yellowish. The female is of a more somber brownish tone and her head and back are flecked with ochre. Both birds have white eyebrow stripes. They have short, rounded wings, a very short tail and a long thin awl-like bill which is brownish and slightly upturned for insertion into cracks. The rifleman flies quickly with a wing beat producing a characteristic humming sound like a hummingbird.

=== Vocalisations ===
The rifleman has a range of simple high-pitched calls, the most commonly used call being a squeaky and repetitive zipt. Their calls are partly in the ultrasonic range of frequencies, although it is unknown what function this serves or even if riflemen are able to hear sounds at these frequencies.

== Distribution and habitat ==
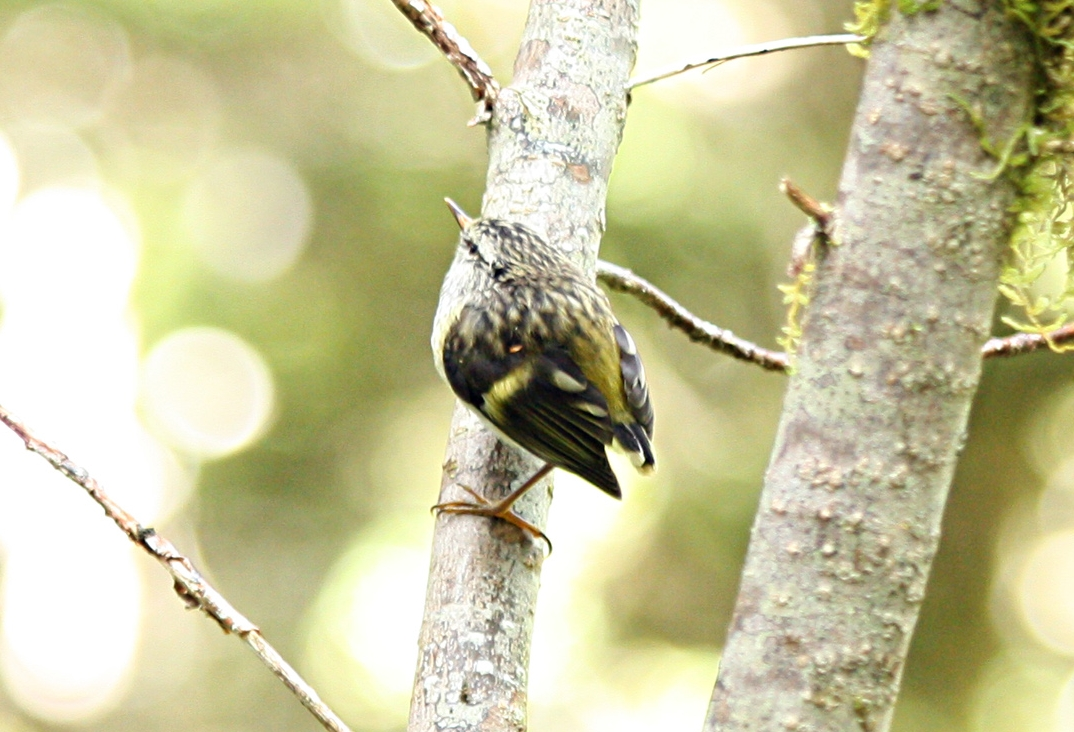
A female rifleman in the South Island

The true habitat of this bird is thinly wooded forests, but other similar New Zealand species live near rocky outcrops. The rifleman is the most widespread species of acanthisittid in the two main islands of New Zealand but occurs only rarely in latitudes north of Te Aroha. The North Island subspecies, A. c. granti, occurs mainly in lowland tawa forest, while the South Island subspecies, A. c. chloris, is found in high-altitude beech forest or lowland areas forested with podocarp.

The rifleman covers the same or similar territory every day, which a male/female pair defend. They can only fly short distances, meaning they are unlikely to cross open areas. The bird was once common across New Zealand, but the fragmentation of forests from land development has meant less habitat and more isolated populations.

== Behaviour and ecology ==
=== Breeding ===
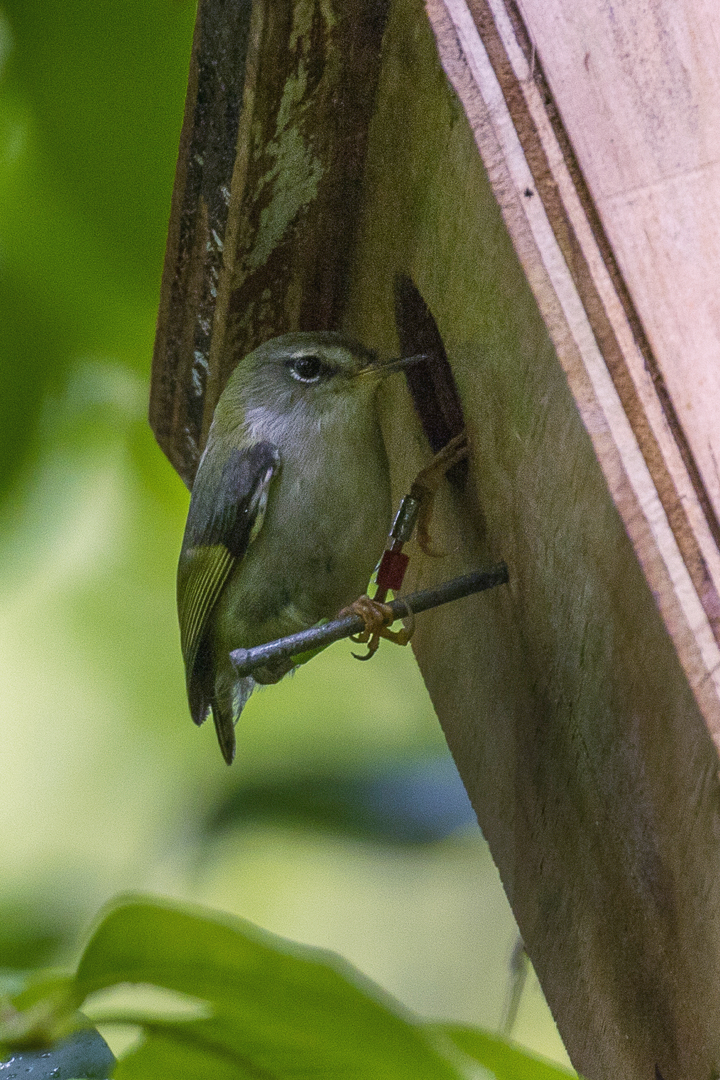
Male at nesting box

Both sexes are responsible for building the nest, which is a dome or ovoid of finely interwoven blades of grass, down feathers, and other light materials. The nest entrance, a small tunnel in the side, is often so narrow that the bird struggles to get inside. The rifleman builds its nest in holes in tree trunks, on a branch, or even in cavities in the ground.

Courtship feeding is an important part of the breeding of the rifleman, with the male feeding the female up to 42% of the food that he collects, representing 35% of her food intake around the time of laying. The average clutch size is two to five eggs, which are incubated for 19–21 days by both sexes. Both parents feed the chicks, and they may be helped by the young from previous broods. Chicks fledge after 21–27 days, and are fully independent after four to six weeks. Two broods per year are common. The species readily takes to nesting in nest boxes, and doing so increases the fledging success of the chicks.

=== Feeding ===
The rifleman is insectivorous and searches for maggots and small insects on tree trunks and among leaf litter on the forest floor. It searches for food in a similar way to the treecreeper. The bird begins its search from the base of a tree and climbs up it progressively, spiralling up around the trunk. Upon finishing its search of a particular tree, the bird glides to the foot of a neighbouring tree and begins its search again.

== Cultural references ==
The rifleman was pictured on the reverse side of the New Zealand $2 note from 1967 until the note was phased out in 1991.
