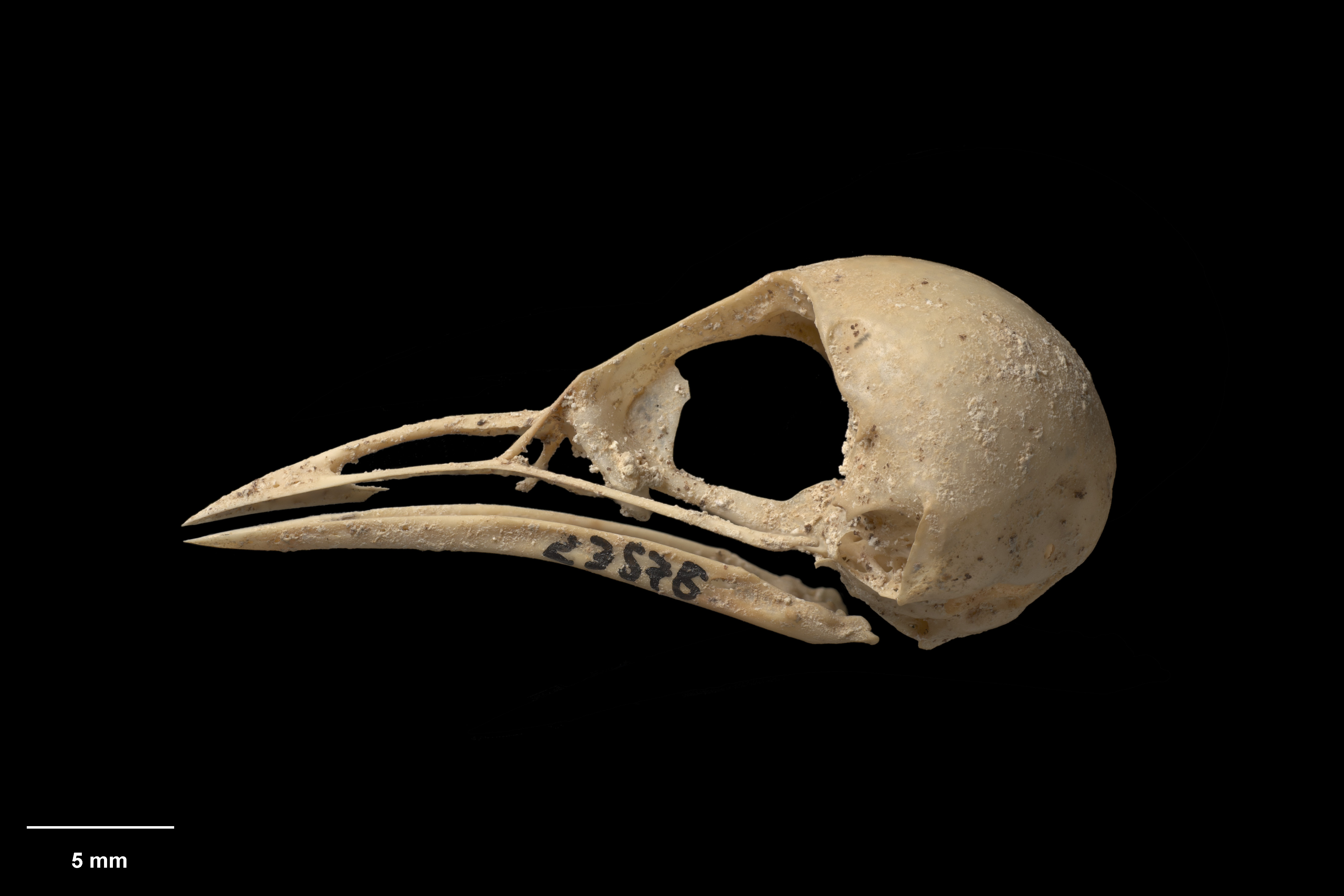
- Xenicus yaldwyni
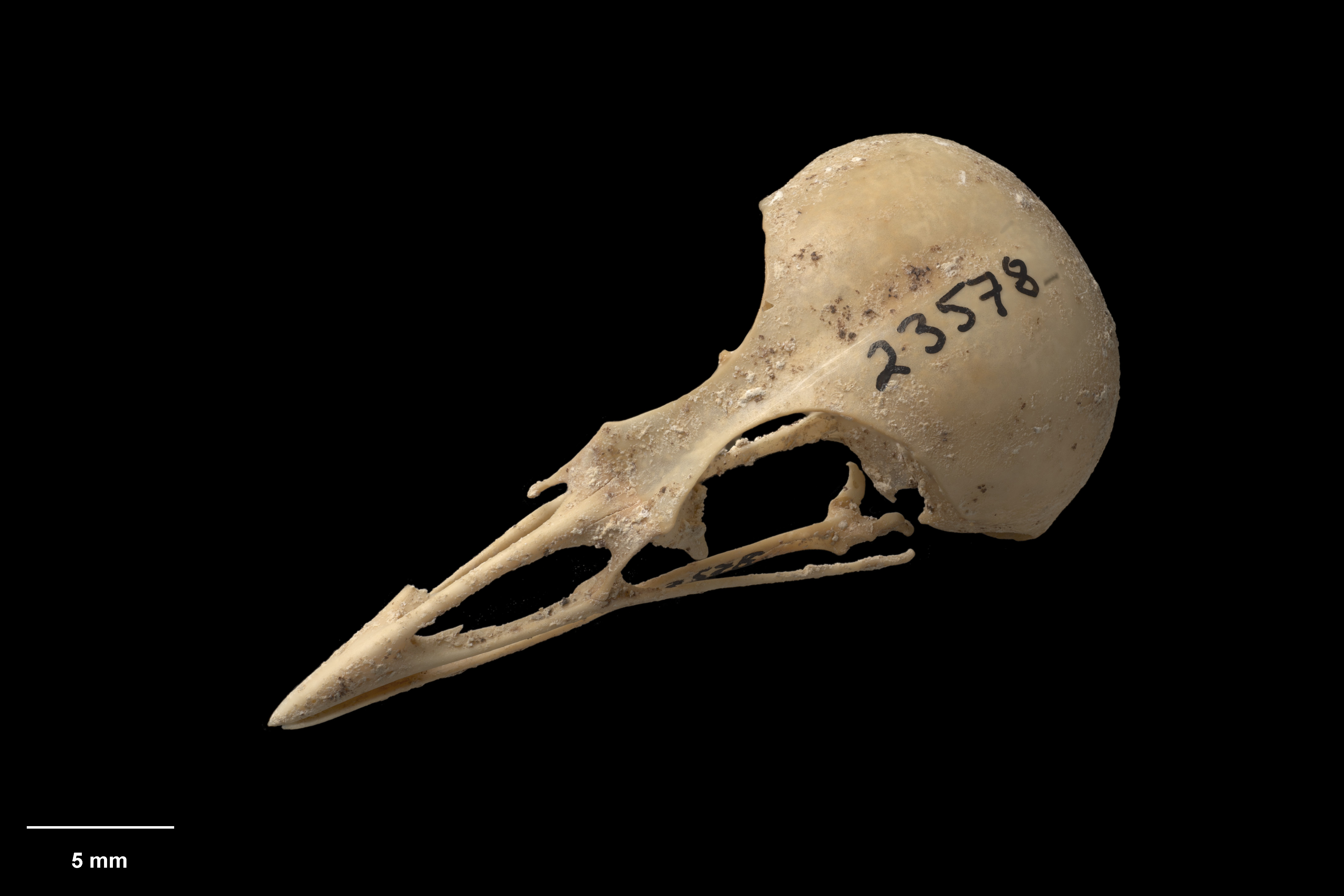
- Xenicus yaldwyni

Scientific classification
- Kingdom: Animalia
- Phylum: Chordata
- Class: Aves
- Order: Passeriformes
- Family: Acanthisittidae
- Genus: Xenicus

Binomial name
- Xenicus yaldwyni Millener, 1988
- Xenicus jagmi Millener, 1988

= Stout-legged wren =

Stout-legged wren Temporal range: Late Pleistocene-Holocene

Extinct species of birds

Stout-legged wren is a common name referring to two species of extinct New Zealand wrens: the North Island stout-legged wren or Grant-Mackie's wren (Xenicus jagmi), and the South Island stout-legged wren or Yaldwyn's wren (Xenicus yaldwyni). These small birds were endemic to New Zealand and were previously included in the genus Pachyplichas.

== History and etymology ==
The holotype for the North Island wren is a right tarsometatarsus (AU 7102.20 in the collections of the Auckland University Geology Department) collected on 25 August 1978 from the Ruakuri Cave in the Waitomo District of North Island of New Zealand. The specific epithet honours Dr John Grant-Mackie, Associate Professor of Geology at Auckland University, in recognition of his support for graduate students and for contributions to avian palaeontology.

The holotype for the South Island wren is a right tarsometatarsus (NMNZS 22683 in the collections of the National Museum) collected on 29 September 1983 from the Honeycomb Hill Cave. The specific epithet honours Dr John Yaldwyn, Director of the National Museum of New Zealand in Wellington, in recognition of his contributions to avian palaeontology.

== Description ==
North: This wren is similar to, though smaller than, its congener from South Island, the South Island stout-legged wren (Xenicus yaldwyni), with which it forms a species pair. Its reduced wings and robust legs indicate that it was strongly adapted to a terrestrial existence and was either flightless or nearly so.

South: It was the largest (by weight) of the New Zealand wrens. The morphology of the wren indicates that it was strongly adapted to a terrestrial existence. Radiocarbon dates for the assemblages with which it is associated range from 25,000 BP to 1,000 BP. Either flightless or nearly so, it became extinct following the occupation of New Zealand by the Polynesian ancestors of the Māori, and the associated introduction of the kiore (Pacific rat).

== Distribution and habitat ==
The subfossil remains of the wren have only been found in the South Island of New Zealand, and it seems to have formed a species pair with the closely related P. jagmi, which was only found in the North Island. Since it has been found in association with four other species of acanthisittids in four genera (at the Honeycomb Hill Cave site) it is likely that its ecological niche was different enough for it to have coexisted with them. Sites where it was found indicate that it inhabited lowland mixed podocarp broadleaf forest, ranging upwards into alpine tundra scrubland.
