= Piopio =

Piopio may refer to:

- Piopio (bird), a genus of extinct birds from New Zealand that contains two species
  - North Island piopio
  - South Island piopio
- Piopio, New Zealand, a town in the Waitomo District in the North Island of New Zealand
- a hill in the Ruahine Range in New Zealand

== See also ==
- Piopiotahi (literally one piopio or first piopio), the Māori name for Milford Sound, in Fiordland, New Zealand
