= List of New Zealand species extinct in the Holocene =

Location of the Realm of New Zealand in the South Pacific Ocean and Antarctica.

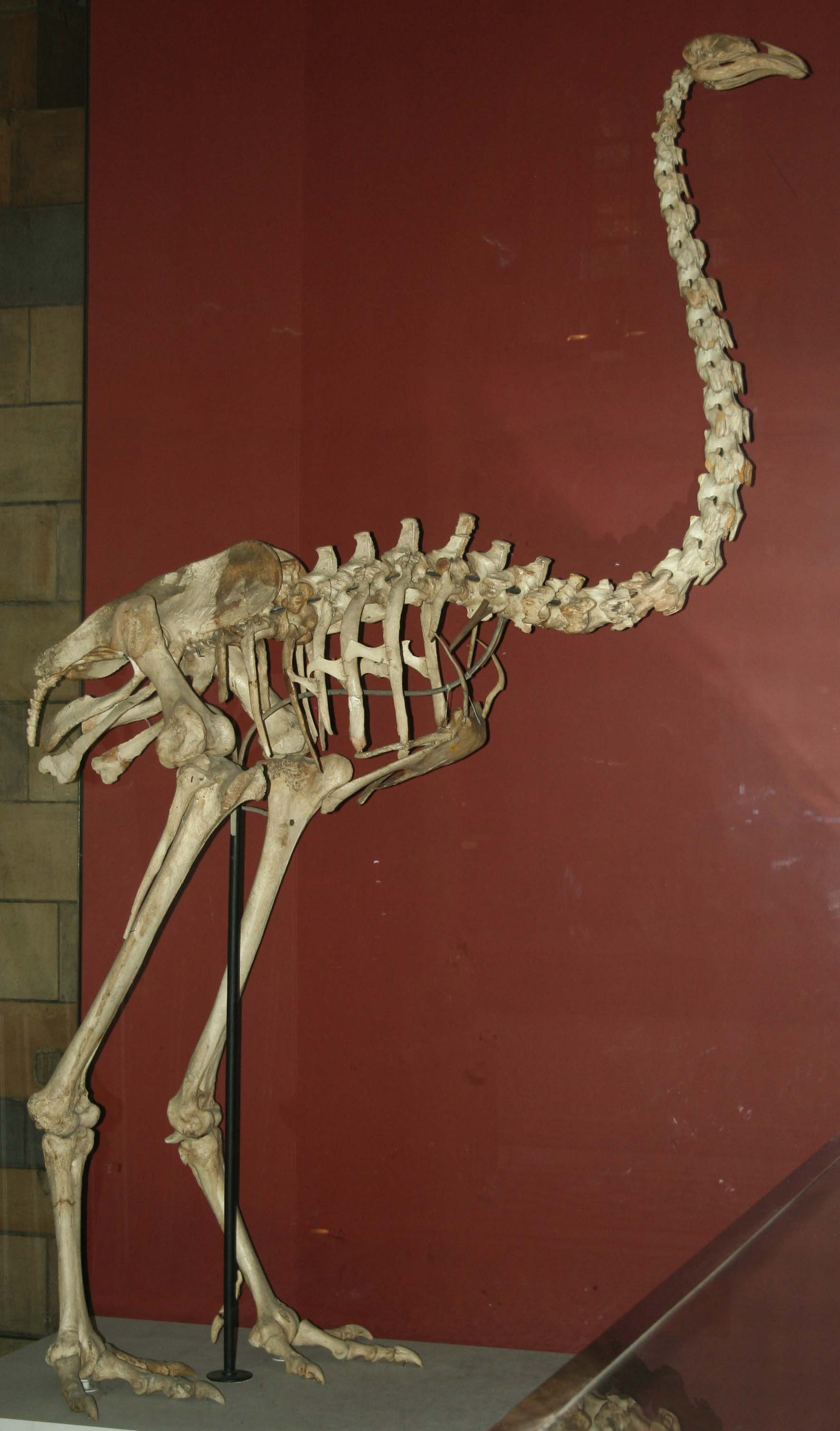
The North Island giant moa (Dinornis novaezealandiae) is among dozens of bird species that became extinct after the human settlement of New Zealand.

This is a list of New Zealand species extinct in the Holocene that covers extinctions from the Holocene epoch, a geologic epoch that began about 11,650 years Before Present (about 9700 BCE) (Note: The source gives "11,700 calendar yr b2k (before CE 2000)". But "BP" means "before CE 1950". Therefore, the Holocene began 11,650 BP. Doing the maths, that is c. 9700 BCE.) and continues to the present day. This epoch equates with the latter third of the Haweran Stage of the Wanganui epoch in the New Zealand geologic time scale.

The North Island and South Island are the two largest islands of New Zealand. Stewart Island is the largest of the smaller islands. New Zealand proper also includes outlying islands such as the Chatham Islands, Kermadec Islands, and New Zealand Subantarctic Islands. Only New Zealand proper is represented on this list, not the Realm of New Zealand. For extinctions in the Cook Islands, Niue, or Tokelau, see the List of Oceanian animals extinct in the Holocene.

The islands of East Polynesia (including New Zealand, Hawaii, and Easter Island) were among the last habitable places on Earth colonised by humans. The first settlers of New Zealand migrated from Polynesia and became the Māori people. According to archeological and genetic research, the ancestors of the Māori arrived in New Zealand no earlier than about 1280 CE, with at least the main settlement period between about 1320 and 1350, consistent with evidence based on whakapapa (genealogical traditions). No credible evidence exists of pre-Māori settlement of New Zealand. In 1642, the Dutch navigator Abel Tasman became the first European explorer known to visit New Zealand. In 1769, British explorer James Cook became the first European to map New Zealand and communicate with the Māori. From the late 18th century, the country was regularly visited by explorers and other sailors, missionaries, traders and adventurers. In 1840, the Treaty of Waitangi annexed New Zealand into the British Empire. As a result of the influx of settlers, the population of Pākehā (European New Zealanders) grew explosively from fewer than 1,000 in 1831 to 500,000 by 1881.

Numerous species have disappeared from New Zealand as part of the ongoing Holocene extinction, driven by human activity. Human contact, first by Polynesians and later by Europeans, had a significant impact on the environment. The arrival of the Māori resulted in animal extinctions due to deforestation and hunting. The Māori also brought two species of land mammals, Polynesian rats (Rattus exulans) and kurī, a breed of domestic dog (Canis lupus familiaris). In pre-human times, bats were the only land mammals found in New Zealand. Polynesian rats definitely contributed to extinctions, and kurī might have contributed as well. Like the Māori settlers centuries earlier, the European settlers hunted native animals and engaged in habitat destruction. They also introduced numerous invasive species. A few examples are black rats (Rattus rattus) and brown rats (Rattus norvegicus), domestic cats (Felis catus), stoats (Mustela erminea), and common brushtail possums (Trichosurus vulpecula).

This list of extinct species only includes the indigenous biota of New Zealand, not domestic animals like the kurī.

== Mammals (class Mammalia) ==
=== Bats (order Chiroptera) ===
==== New Zealand short-tailed bats (family Mystacinidae) ====
===== Possibly extinct =====
Common name	Scientific name	Range	Comments	Pictures
New Zealand greater short-tailed bat	Mystacina robusta	North and South Island	Widespread on both islands in pre-Māori times, as evidenced by subfossil remains, this species was restricted to Taukihepa / Big South Cape Island and other islands off Stewart Island at the time of European arrival. The reason for extinction in the mainland was likely predation by introduced Polynesian rats. Listed as "Critically Endangered (Possibly Extinct)" by the IUCN as individuals have not been sighted since 1967, following the introduction of black rats to Taukihepa / Big South Cape Island. However, the species might still persist on Big South Cape, Putauhinu and other islands off Stewart.	

=== Carnivorans (order Carnivora) ===
==== Eared seals (family Otariidae) ====
Common name	Scientific name	Range	Comments	Pictures
New Zealand sea lion	Phocarctos hookeri 'NZ'	Coastal North and South Island	Distinct lineage of the New Zealand sea lion once found all over the North and South Islands, as evidenced by ancient DNA studies on subfossil remains dating to just before 1280 CE. It was hunted to extinction by the Maori within a few centuries. Afterwards, the subantarctic lineage of the New Zealand sea lion colonised Stewart Island and the southeastern coast of the South Island from the Auckland and Campbell Islands.	Female and male of the only surviving lineage, the subantarctic New Zealand sea lion
Chatham Islands sea lion	Phocarctos hookeri 'Chathams'	Chatham Islands	Distinct lineage that became extinct due to overhunting within two centuries of Moriori settlement, in 1450-1650 CE.	Female and male of the only surviving lineage, the subantarctic New Zealand sea lion

==== Earless seals (family Phocidae) ====
===== Locally extinct =====
Common name	Scientific name	Range	Comments	Pictures
Southern elephant seal	Mirounga leonina	Antarctic	Extirpated from New Zealand around 1250-1450 AD.	

== Birds (class Aves) ==
=== Moa (order Dinornithiformes) ===
==== Giant moa (family Dinornithidae) ====
Common name	Scientific name	Range	Comments	Pictures
North Island giant moa	Dinornis novaezealandiae	North Island and Great Barrier Island	Most recent bones in the Ruahine Range were dated to 1286–1390 CE. The main cause of extinction was overhunting. Moa chicks may have also been eaten by Polynesian dogs.	
South Island giant moa	Dinornis robustus	South Island, Stewart Island, and D'Urville Island	Most recent bones in Tumbledown Bay, Canterbury were dated to 1451–1952 CE (1558–1728 CE maximum likelihood), making this a contender for last surviving moa species. They were hunted, and their bones are widespread in Māori middens, shaped into tools and ornaments. Estimates of moa remains in 1,200 open ovens and middens surveyed in the vicinity of the Waitaki River mouth during the 1930s range from 29,000 to 90,000. Moa chicks may have been eaten by Polynesian dogs. Burning of the giant moa's dry forest and shrubland habitat also likely reduced their numbers.	

==== Lesser moa (family Emeidae) ====
Common name	Scientific name	Range	Comments	Pictures
Bush moa	Anomalopteryx didiformis	North Island, South Island, and Stewart Island	Most recent bones in Echo Valley, Fiordland were dated to 1310-1420 CE. The main cause of extinction was overhunting. Moa chicks may have been eaten by Polynesian dogs.	
Eastern moa	Emeus crassus	South Island	Most recent eggshell fragments at Wairau Bar were dated to 1320–1350 CE. The main cause of extinction was overhunting. Remains are widespread in middens, along with tools used to cut up carcasses and to work bones into tools. Middens in the Marlborough district contained remains of more than 4,000 individuals and large numbers of eggs. Eastern moa was the second most abundant species recorded after the broad-billed moa. Moa chicks may have also been eaten by Polynesian dogs. Burning of the eastern moa's forest and shrubland habitat is also likely to have reduced its numbers.	
Broad-billed moa	Euryapteryx curtus	North, South, (Note: This 2010 source treats Euryapteryx curtus and Euryapteryx gravis as separate species. Now they are generally treated as synonyms.) Stewart, and Great Barrier Island	Most recent bones in Ototara, North Otago were dated to 1464–1637 CE, making this a contender for last surviving moa species. The main cause of extinction was overhunting. Remains are widespread in middens, along with specialised tools used to cut up carcasses and to work bones into tools. Moa chicks may have also been eaten by Polynesian dogs. Burning of the broad-billed moa's forest and shrubland habitat is also likely to have reduced its numbers.	
Heavy-footed moa	Pachyornis elephantopus	South Island and Stewart Island	Most recent bones in Kawarau Valley, Central Otago were dated to 1294–1438 CE. The main cause of extinction was overhunting. Moa chicks may also have been eaten by Polynesian dogs. Burning of eastern dryland forests and shrublands is also likely to have reduced the extent of suitable habitat.	
Mantell's moa	Pachyornis geranoides	North Island	Most recent remains were dated to 1278–1415 CE. The main cause of extinction was overhunting. Moa chicks may also have been eaten by Polynesian dogs.	
Crested moa	Pachyornis australis	South Island	Subalpine restricted species believed extinct during the Pleistocene-Holocene extinction around 10,000 years ago, until a partial skeleton from the Bulmer Cavern of Mount Owen was dated to 1396–1442 CE. The main cause of extinction was probably overhunting. Crested moa chicks may also have been eaten by Polynesian dogs.	

==== Upland moa (family Megalapterygidae) ====
Common name	Scientific name	Range	Comments	Pictures
Upland moa	Megalapteryx didinus	South Island	Butchered remains in the Murchison Mountains of Fiordland were dated to 1300–1422 CE. The main cause of extinction was overhunting. Remains are widespread in middens, along with specialised tools used to cut up moa carcasses and to work bones into tools. Moa chicks may have been killed by Polynesian dogs.	

=== Landfowl (order Galliformes) ===
==== Megapodes (family Megapodidae) ====
Common name	Scientific name	Range	Comments
Kermadec megapode	Megapodius sp. nov. 'Raoul Island'	Raoul, Kermadec Islands	Wiped out by a volcanic eruption in 1876. Though seen by Europeans, no specimens were collected and no remains survive. As the previous eruption has been dated to only 5,000 years before, it has been speculated that the same species of megapode lived elsewhere in Polynesia.

==== Pheasants and allies (family Phasianidae) ====
Common name	Scientific name	Range	Comments	Pictures
New Zealand quail	Coturnix novaezelandidae	North Island, South Island, and Great Barrier Island	Extinct since 1875. The reason is unknown, though exotic pathogens have been suggested.	

=== Waterfowl (order Anseriformes) ===
==== Ducks, geese, and swans (family Anatidae) ====
Common name	Scientific name	Range	Comments	Pictures
Chatham duck	Anas chathamica	Chatham Islands	Remains dated to 448–657 CE, but believed to have survived until Polynesian arrival c. 1350. The species likely became extinct through overhunting, as it was large and flightless.	
New Zealand musk duck	Biziura delautouri	North Island and South Island	One bone was found in a food midden. Hunting is the most likely cause of extinction, which happened before European arrival.	
Finsch's duck	Chenonetta finschi	North Island and South Island	Extinct in the 16th century due to hunting and predation by Polynesian rats.	
South Island goose	Cnemiornis calcitrans	South Island	Hunted by early Polynesian settlers, their remains are widespread in midden deposits. Overhunting is the most likely cause of extinction. The date of extinction is unknown, but probably happened in the 16th century.	
North Island goose	Cnemiornis gracilis	North Island	Remains dated to the first millennium CE, but believed to have survived until Polynesian arrival c. 1280. A possible historical record, describing a rufous flightless goose that was hunted with dogs, was made in 1875. Though the reasons of extinction are unknown, any flightless goose would have been extremely vulnerable to overhunting.	
Chatham Islands swan	Cygnus sumnerensis chathamicus	Chatham Islands	Likely hunted to extinction by the Moriori before 1650 CE.	
New Zealand swan	Cygnus sumnerensis sumnerensis	South Island	Bones were found in Polynesian middens, and dated to 1059-1401 CE. It was probably driven to extinction through overhunting before 1450 CE. This species was considered once synonymous with the Australian black swan which was later introduced to New Zealand by Europeans, but an ancient DNA study confirmed that they were different species that separated from a common ancestor 1–2 million years ago.	
Scarlett's duck	Malacorhynchus scarletti	North Island, South Island, and Chatham Islands	Became extinct sometime after Polynesian arrival. It was hunted by the Māori and its nests were possibly susceptible to predation by Polynesian rats.	
New Zealand merganser	Mergus australis	Auckland Islands, North Island, South Island, Stewart Island (Note: "Chatham Island fossils may represent an undescribed taxon, a suggestion yet to be investigated." This apparently refers to the Chatham merganser (Mergus milleneri), which was described in 2014.)	Reduced to the Auckland Islands only by the time of European colonisation, it was last recorded in 1902. Became extinct due to hunting and predation by introduced mammals.	
Chatham Island merganser	Mergus milleneri	Chatham Island	Only known from bones found in middens. Hunting is the most likely cause of extinction.	
New Zealand stiff-tailed duck	Oxyura vantetsi	North Island and South Island	Extinct before European contact. Hunting is the most likely cause of extinction, and a bone found in the South Island may have come from a human midden.	
Rēkohu shelduck	Tadorna rekohu	Chatham Islands	Hunted to extinction after Moriori arrival, c. 1500 AD. Though not flightless, it had reduced flying ability compared to its relative, the paradise shelduck.	

=== Owlet-nightjars (order Aegotheliformes) ===
==== Owlet-nightjars (family Aegothelidae) ====
Common name	Scientific name	Range	Comments	Pictures
New Zealand owlet-nightjar	Aegotheles novazelandiae	North Island and South Island	Last dated to 1183 CE but presumed to have survived until Maori arrival in the 13th century. It wasn't hunted. Probably driven to extinction by Polynesian rats.	

=== Pigeons and doves (order Columbiformes) ===
==== Pigeons and doves (family Columbidae) ====
Common name	Scientific name	Range	Comments
Raoul Island pigeon	Hemiphaga novaeseelandiae ssp.	Raoul, Kermadec Islands	Known from a single humerus and descriptions. It was extinct by 1887, due to hunting and predation by feral cats.

=== Rails and cranes (order Gruiformes) ===
==== Adzebills (family Aptornithidae) ====
Common name	Scientific name	Range	Comments	Pictures
South Island adzebill	Aptornis defossor	South Island	Most recent bones were dated to 1234–1445 CE. The presence of adzebill bones in middens indicates that early Polynesian settlers hunted the species, and this is the most likely cause of extinction. Nests could also have been raided by Polynesian rats.	
North Island adzebill	Aptornis otidiformis	North Island	Most recently dated to around 1000 CE, but believed to have survived until Polynesian arrival. The presence of adzebill bones in middens indicates that early Polynesian settlers hunted them, and this is the most likely cause of extinction. Nests could also have been raided by Polynesian rats.	

==== Rails (family Rallidae) ====
Common name	Scientific name	Range	Comments	Pictures
Chatham rail	Cabalus modestus	Chatham Islands	Last recorded between 1893 and 1895. Extinct due to habitat destruction, competition with and predation by introduced mammals.	
Snipe-rail	Capellirallus karamu	North Island	Excavations at Lake Poukawa, Hawke's Bay show that snipe-rails were once common but drastically reduced in numbers after Māori colonisation and the vegetation changed from podocarp forest to bracken and scrub, likely because of fire. However, the main factor of extinction was probably predation by Polynesian rats.	
Hawkins's rail	Diaphorapteryx hawkinsi	Chatham Islands	Last recorded in 1895. It was hunted to extinction.	
Chatham coot	Fulica chathamensis	Chatham Island	Remains dated to 701–119 BCE, but believed to have survived until Polynesian arrival c. 1350 CE. Probably became extinct due to overhunting and predation of eggs and chicks by Polynesian rats. Its bones are common in middens, indicating that it was frequently taken for food.	
New Zealand coot	Fulica prisca	North Island and South Island	Extinct due to overhunting by early Māori. Its bones are common in two archaeological middens in coastal Marlborough, where some coot bones were shaped into tools. Nests could also have been raided by introduced predators.	
Dieffenbach's rail	Hypotaenidia dieffenbachii	Chatham Islands	Last collected in 1840. It was possibly driven to extinction by introduced predators and habitat loss due to fire.	
Raoul Island banded rail	Hypotaenidia sp.	Raoul, Kermadec Islands, New Zealand	Last recorded in 1891. Extinct due to predation by introduced cats or rats.	
North Island takahē	Porphyrio mantelli	North Island	Restricted to high altitude grasslands, this species declined with the expansion of forests in the Holocene but survived until hunting by the Maori drove it to extinction. There is a disputed historical observation from 1894.	
Hodgens' waterhen	Tribonyx hodgenorum	North Island and South Island	Disappeared in the 17th century as a result of hunting and predation by Polynesian rats.	

=== Shorebirds (order Charadriiformes) ===
==== Sandpipers (family Scolopacidae) ====
Common name	Scientific name	Range	Comments	Pictures
North Island snipe	Coenocorypha barrierensis	Little Barrier Island, Browns Island (disputed), and North Island	Subfossil remains found across the North Island. A possible live individual was shot on Browns Island in 1820, and another was collected on Little Barrier Island in 1870. It is presumed extinct due to predation by Polynesian rats on the North Island and by feral cats introduced by Europeans on smaller islands.	
Forbes's snipe	Coenocorypha chathamica	Chatham Island and Pitt Island	Presumed extirpated by Polynesian rats on Chatham Island between 1500 and 1800 CE, and by feral cats on Pitt Island by the late 19th century.	
South Island snipe	Coenocorypha iredalei	South Island, Stewart Island, Jacky Lee Island, Big South Cape Island, and possibly other offshore islands	Extirpated from the larger islands due to predation by Polynesian rats and from the smaller ones by black rats. The last population in Big South Cape Island disappeared in 1964 after a failed relocation attempt.	

=== Albatrosses and petrels (order Procellariiformes) ===
==== Petrels and shearwaters (family Procellariidae) ====
Common name	Scientific name	Range	Comments
Imber's petrel	Pterodroma imberi	Chatham Islands	Probably disappeared from Chatham Island due to hunting and predation by Polynesian rats. It survived in Mangere Island until the 18th century, and in Pitt Island until the middle or late 19th century, when it was finished by feral cats.
Scarlett's shearwater	Puffinus spelaeus	South Island	Most recently dated to 1350 CE. Breeding colonies may have been overexploited directly, and their small size would have made eggs and chicks vulnerable to predation by Polynesian rats.

=== Penguins (order Sphenisciformes) ===
==== Penguins (family Spheniscidae) ====
Common name	Scientific name	Range	Comments	Pictures
Chatham penguin	Eudyptes warhami	Chatham Islands, North Island, and South Island	Last dated after the 13th century. It was almost certainly extinct before Europeans arrived in the Chatham Islands; a crested penguin captured alive in 1871 or 1872 was probably a vagrant of another species in the same genus.	
Richdale's penguin	Megadyptes antipodes richdalei	Chatham Islands	Last dated after the 13th century. It was hunted to extinction.	
Waitaha penguin	Megadyptes antipodes waitaha	North Island, South Island, Stewart Island, and Codfish Island / Whenua Hou	Last dated to 1347–1529 CE. Archaeological remains indicate that early Polynesian settlers hunted the species and that this, with possible additional predation by Polynesian rats and dogs, was a probable cause of extinction. After its extinction, the subantarctic subspecies of the yellow-eyed penguin, M. a. antipodes, colonised Stewart Island and part of the South Island from the Auckland and Campbell Islands.	

=== Boobies, cormorants, and allies (order Suliformes) ===
==== Cormorants and shags (family Phalacrocoracidae) ====
Common name	Scientific name	Range	Comments
Kohatu shag	Leucocarbo septentrionalis	North Island	Described in 2017. Known from fossil bones found in the Northland Region. Probably killed off by early human hunters.

=== Pelicans, herons, and ibises (order Pelecaniformes) ===
==== Herons (family Ardeidae) ====
Common name	Scientific name	Range	Comments	Pictures
New Zealand bittern	Ixobrychus novaezelandiae	South Island, North Island and Chatham Island	Last definite records from the mid-1890s. Scarcity during colonial history may have been due to early spread of brown rats and feral cats throughout New Zealand; a captive bird showed alarm at the presence of a cat. Final extinction coincided with the first expansion of stoats on the West Coast Region, before the wetlands were drained for farming.	

=== Hawks and relatives (order Accipitriformes) ===
==== Hawks, eagles, kites, harriers and Old World vultures (family Accipitridae) ====
Common name	Scientific name	Range	Comments	Pictures
Eyles's harrier	Circus teauteensis	North Island and South Island	Last dated to the first millennium CE but believed to have survived until Polynesian arrival c. 1280. There is a dubious observation from the 1870s. It is thought to have become extinct due to a combination of human-induced impacts: its forest and shrubland habitat was burned off and replaced with grassland, predation by introduced Polynesian rats probably caused a decline in its prey species, and hunting by humans is apparent from the presence of harrier bones in middens, and use of its bones to make tools. The Polynesian rat and dog may have also preyed on chicks. Unlike the closely related swamp harrier which colonised New Zealand after its extinction, it was probably too heavy and small-winged to hunt over open grassland areas.	
Haast's eagle	Hieraaetus moorei	South Island and Stewart Island	Most recent eggshell fragments at Wairau Bar were dated to 1320–1350 CE. It became extinct around the same time as all moa species. Overhunting of its moa prey was probably the main cause of its extinction. Loss of habitat due to the burning of dry mosaic forests and shrublands may also have caused declines in its prey species. Haast's eagle may also have been hunted because of its bones, some of which were found in middens after being worked into tools. Nests could also have been raided by feral pigs and rats. Two claimed sightings from the 1800s are unlikely to have been Haast's eagle.	

=== Owls (order Strigiformes) ===
==== True owls (family Strigidae) ====
Common name	Scientific name	Range	Comments	Pictures
Laughing owl	Ninox albifacies	North Island, South Island, and Stewart Island (Note: According to this 2010 source, the laughing owl's "reported fossil occurrence on Chatham Island has been discounted.")	Though possibly declining in the North Island before major European settlement, it was reportedly common in the Urewera Ranges in pre-European times. Only two specimens were collected from the North Island, now lost. They were common in the South Island in the mid-1800s, but thereafter declined rapidly. The last specimen was collected in 1914, and they were probably extinct by 1940. Polynesian rats formed an important part of the owl's diet and is unlikely to have contributed to its extinction. Instead, the rapid decline of the laughing owl has been attributed to predation and competition by stoats, ferrets, and weasels introduced to control rabbits in the 1880s, as well as feral cats. Unidentified calls heard in 1960 could be of this species.	

=== Parrots (order Psittaciformes) ===
==== Kea and kākā (family Nestoridae) ====
Common name	Scientific name	Range	Comments	Pictures
Chatham kākā	Nestor chathamensis	Chatham Islands	The species became extinct sometime between the 13th and 16th centuries, possibly as a result of habitat loss caused by deforestation, hunting, and predation by Polynesian rats.	

==== Old World parrots (family Psittaculidae) ====
Common name	Scientific name	Range	Comments
Campbell Island parakeet	Cyanoramphus sp.	Campbell Island	Known from a single subfossil coracoid. Possibly disappeared after the introduction of brown rats to the island in 1810. In 1840 the island was noted to lack any terrestrial birds.

=== Perching birds (order Passeriformes) ===
==== New Zealand wrens (family Acanthisittidae) ====
Common name	Scientific name	Range	Comments	Pictures
Lyall's wren	Traversia lyalli	Stephens Island, North Island, and South Island	Disappeared from the main islands after Maori settlement, likely because of habitat loss and predation by Polynesian rats. It lingered on Stephens Island until 1895, when it was exterminated by domestic cats.	
Bushwren	Xenicus longipes	North Island, South Island, Stewart Island, Kapiti Island, Big South Cape Island, Solomon Island and Pukeweka offshore Stewart Island	Extinct since 1972 due to predation by feral cats, rats, weasels, and stoats.	
North Island stout-legged wren	Xenicus jagmi	North Island	Extinct after Māori settlement but before European contact. Sometimes considered conspecific with X. yaldwyni.	
South Island stout-legged wren	Xenicus yaldwyni	South Island	Extinct after Māori settlement but before European contact.	
Long-billed wren	Dendroscansor decurvirostris	South Island	Extinct shortly after Māori settlement. Its flightlessness and probable ground-nesting habits would have made it easy prey for Polynesian rats.	

==== Honeyeaters (family Meliphagidae) ====
Common name	Scientific name	Range	Comments	Pictures
Chatham bellbird	Anthornis melanocephala	Chatham Islands	Last recorded in Little Mangere Island in 1906. Probably extirpated by feral cats and Polynesian rats, then brown rats, and latterly, collection for museum specimens.	

==== Old World orioles (family Oriolidae) ====
Common name	Scientific name	Range	Comments	Pictures
North Island piopio	Turnagra tanagra	North Island	Last known individual killed at Ōhura, south Waikato, in 1902. Unconfirmed sightings continued into the 1970s, mainly from forest behind Whanganui, inland Taranaki and Te Urewera. It is likely that predation by introduced black rats was the main cause of extinction, though birds were occasionally eaten by settlers, and their final disappearance coincided with the spread of stoats.	
South Island piopio	Turnagra capensis capensis	South Island and some Fiordland islands	Declined rapidly following European settlement, especially after 1870. It was extinct on Banks and Otago Peninsulas by the 1880s, and on the West Coast and Fiordland by c. 1895. This coincided with the spread of introduced black rats and later, stoats. The last confirmed record was in 1905. Unconfirmed sightings persisted into the 1930s, with the last in west Otago in 1963. Suggestions to transfer South Island piopio to an offshore sanctuary such as Kapiti Island or Little Barrier Island never eventuated, as live capture was very difficult before the invention of modern mist nets.	
Stephens Island piopio	Turnagra capensis minor	Stephens Island	Last collected in 1897. Became extinct following clearance of the island's forest and introduction of cats by lighthouse keepers.	

==== Crows and relatives (family Corvidae) ====
Common name	Scientific name	Range	Comments	Pictures
North Island raven	Corvus moriorum antipodum	North Island	Extinct before European contact. The presence of bones in middens shows that they were eaten by humans, and they may have been impacted by the rapid extirpation of seal and seabird colonies following human arrival.	
South Island raven	Corvus moriorum pycrafti	South Island, Stewart Island Enderby Island in the Auckland Islands (possible vagrant individual)	Extinct before European contact. The presence of bones in middens shows that they were eaten by humans, and they may have been impacted by the rapid extirpation of seal and seabird colonies following human arrival.	
Chatham raven	Corvus moriorum moriorum	Chatham Islands	Extinct before European contact. The presence of bones in middens shows that they were eaten by humans, and they may have been impacted by the rapid extirpation of seal and seabird colonies following human arrival.	

==== New Zealand wattlebirds (family Callaeidae) ====
Common name	Scientific name	Range	Comments	Pictures
Huia	Heteralocha acutirostris	North Island	Last accepted sighting in 1907, but it's likely that a few persisted into the 1920s. Predation by introduced mammals and, to a lesser extent, human hunting, was the likely cause of extinction. Large areas of native forest containing huia were logged or burned in the 1800s to make way for farming, but this would have caused a modest range reduction rather than being a major contributor to extinction. Māori traditionally prized and wore huia tail feathers as a mark of status. Tail feathers became fashionable in Britain after the Duke of York was photographed wearing one during a 1901 visit to New Zealand. Overseas bird collectors and museums bought mounted specimens and tail feathers. Austrian naturalist Andreas Reischek took 212 pairs between 1877 and 1889. Walter Buller recorded that 11 Māori hunters took 646 huia skins from the forest between Manawatū Gorge and Ākitio during one month in 1863. Gilbert Mair recorded eating 'a splendid stew of Huia, Kaka, Pigeons & Bacon' with Buller at a bush camp in Wairarapa, October 1883, after shooting 16 huia and capturing live birds. Thousands of huia were exported overseas. Protection measures enacted in the 1890s were poorly enforced. Two male birds kept at London Zoo in the 1880s died in captivity. Plans to transfer huia to Kapiti and Little Barrier Island reserves never eventuated. A pair captured in 1893 for transfer to Little Barrier was acquired by Buller and apparently sent to Baron Walter Rothschild in England.	

===== Possibly extinct, New Zealand wattlebirds (family Callaeidae) =====
Common name	Scientific name	Range	Comments	Pictures
South Island kōkako	Callaeas cinereus	South Island Stewart Island, and offshore islands	The main cause of decline was predation by black rats (introduced in the 1860s), cats, stoats, and weasels (1880s in the latter two's case). It was described as rapidly approaching extinction in 1889, when the related North Island kōkako was still relatively common. It has been suggested this difference was due to the tendency of South Island kōkako to spend longer feeding on the forest floor and to nest closer to the ground, making it more vulnerable. Like huia, South Island kōkako were described as ecologically naive. An incubating bird tolerated a close approach without giving an alarm call or defending its young. Māori traditionally hunted them, and large numbers were killed for sale to European collectors and museums. Declared extinct by the Department of Conservation in 2008, the species' conservation status was moved from extinct to data deficient in 2013 following the acceptance of a sighting near Reefton on the West Coast Region of the South Island in 2007. Another unconfirmed sighting took place in the Heaphy Track in Kahurangi National Park in 2018. A 2021 sighting and recording from Heaphy Track is undergoing analysis. In 2019, the IUCN Red List estimated the probability of the species being extant as 0.898 based on records and surveys and 0.220 based on threats. Despite this high probability, recent reports are not deemed credible and so the species is considered Possibly Extinct.	

==== Grassbirds and allies (family Locustellidae) ====
Common name	Scientific name	Range	Comments	Pictures
Chatham fernbird	Poodytes rufescens	Chatham Islands	Probably wiped out on Chatham Island by Polynesian rats which arrived with the first human settlers, or by cats during the 19th century. On its final stronghold of Mangere Island, the last specimens were collected in 1895, shortly after cats were released to control rabbits.	

==== Australasian robins (family Petroicidae) ====
===== Extinct in the wild =====
Common name	Scientific name	Range	Comments	Pictures
Black robin	Petroica traversi	Chatham Islands	Extirpated from the larger islands by the 1870s as a result of forest clearance by European settlers, and predation by introduced cats and rats. The population of Mangere Island followed after cats were introduced in the 1890s. The last seven individuals were captured in Little Mangere Island in 1976 and transferred to a controlled breeding program in Mangere, where cats had died out by then. The species has since been successfully reintroduced to Mangere and Rangatira Island.	

== Reptiles (class Reptilia) ==
=== Squamates (order Squamata) ===
==== Australia-New Zealand geckos (family Diplodactylidae) ====
===== Locally extinct =====
Common name	Scientific name	Range	Comments	Pictures
Duvaucel's gecko	Hoplodactylus duvaucelii	North and South Island	Presently reduced to offshore islands and a relict population in the Waikato.	

Note. (Note: The extinct gecko Gigarcanum delcourti is known only from a single specimen of unknown provenance. It was previously considered a member of the New Zealand endemic genus Hoplodactylus, but DNA evidence from the specimen suggests that it originates from New Caledonia.)

==== Skinks (family Scincidae) ====
Common name	Scientific name	Range	Comments	Pictures
Northland skink	Oligosoma northlandi	Northland Region, North Island	Much larger than living New Zealand skinks, it was likely exterminated by predating Polynesian rats. Only known from late Holocene subfossil remains.	

===== Locally extinct =====
Common name	Scientific name	Range	Comments	Pictures
Robust skink	Oligosoma alani	North Island	Presently found in offshore islands only (and a small southern refuge, in the case of O. whitakeri). Likely extirpated from the mainland by predating Polynesian rats.	
Chevron skink	Oligosoma homalonotum	North Island	Presently found in offshore islands only (and a small southern refuge, in the case of O. whitakeri). Likely extirpated from the mainland by predating Polynesian rats.	
Macgregor's skink	Oligosoma macgregori	North Island	Presently found in offshore islands only (and a small southern refuge, in the case of O. whitakeri). Likely extirpated from the mainland by predating Polynesian rats.	
Marbled skink	Oligosoma oliveri	North Island	Presently found in offshore islands only (and a small southern refuge, in the case of O. whitakeri). Likely extirpated from the mainland by predating Polynesian rats.	
Whitaker's skink	Oligosoma whitakeri	North Island	Presently found in offshore islands only (and a small southern refuge, in the case of O. whitakeri). Likely extirpated from the mainland by predating Polynesian rats.	

== Amphibians (class Amphibia) ==
=== Toads and frogs (order Anura) ===
==== New Zealand primitive frogs (family Leiopelmatidae) ====
Common name	Scientific name	Range	Comments	Pictures
Aurora frog	Leiopelma auroraensis	Fiordland, South Island	Known from subfossil bones. Probably disappeared within the past 1,000 years due to predation by the Polynesian rat.	
Markham's frog	Leiopelma markhami	North Island and South Island	Last dated to 1650 CE. Probably disappeared due to predation by the Polynesian rat.	
Waitomo frog	Leiopelma waitomoensis	North Island	Last dated to 220–320 CE, but believed to have survived until the past 1,000 years. Probably disappeared due to predation by the Polynesian rat.	

== Ray-finned fish (class Actinopterygii) ==
=== Smelts (order Osmeriformes) ===
==== Australia-New Zealand smelts and graylings (family Retropinnidae) ====
Common name	Scientific name	Range	Comments	Pictures
New Zealand grayling	Prototroctes oxyrhynchus	North Island and South Island	Abundant at the time of European settlement in the 1860s, population decline was noted by the late 1870s. By the 1920s the species was known to exist only in some streams in the East Cape, Wairarapa, and Otaki districts in the North Island, and on the West Coast of the South Island. Even in these areas, specimens were rarely encountered. In the early 1930s a specimen, possibly the last, was brought to the British Museum, though the origin and date of collection were not noted. The extinction was possibly due to a combination of factors including over-exploitation, deterioration of the freshwater habitat through clearance of forest cover resulting in increased light penetration, raised water temperature, and invasive salmonids.	

== Insects (class Insecta) ==
=== Beetles (order Coleoptera) ===
==== Ground beetles (family Carabidae) ====
Scientific name	Range	Comments
Mecodema punctellum	Stephens Island	This large, flightless ground beetle species has not been seen since 1931 despite searches on both Stephens Island and the nearby D'Urville Island.

==== Weevils (family Curculionidae) ====
Common name	Scientific name	Range	Comments	Pictures
Fern Weevil	Tymbopiptus valeas	North Island	Described from subfossil body parts found in a limestone shaft near Waitomo. Last dated to 200-300 CE, but presumed to have survived until Polynesian arrival. Likely wiped out due to deforestation and invasive species. As a large, flightless weevil, it would be very vulnerable to predation by polynesian rats.	

=== Bark lice, book lice, and parasitic lice (order Psocodea) ===
==== Bird chewing lice (family Philopteridae) ====
Common name	Scientific name	Range	Comments
Bushwren louse	Philopteroides xenicus	New Zealand	Parasite of the bushwren, co-extinct with its host.
Huia louse	Rallicola extinctus	North Island	Parasite of the huia, co-extinct with its host.
Little spotted kiwi louse	Rallicola pilgrimi	North and South Island	Extinct when its host was relocated to predator-free islands as part of conservation efforts.

== Clitellates (class Clitellata) ==
=== Order Opisthopora ===
==== Family Megascolecidae ====
Common name	Scientific name	Range	Comments
Schmarda's worm	Tokea orthostichon	North Island	Described in 1861 from a single specimen in Maungarei, Auckland. There are no other survey reports of this species, nor was it found in recent searches.

== Plants (kingdom Plantae) ==
=== Order Brassicales ===
==== Mustards (family Brassicaceae) ====
Common name	Scientific name	Range	Comments	Pictures
Waitakere scurvy grass	Lepidium amissum	Coastal Waitākere Ranges, North Island	Last collected in 1917. It was already uncommon then and wasn't described as a species until 2013, from herbarium specimens. The reasons for extinction are unclear, but might be related to habitat alteration.	
	Lepidium obtusatum	Coastal Waitākere Ranges and Wellington, North Island	Last seen in Waitākere in 1917 and in Wellington in 1950. The Wellington population seems to have been eliminated through a combination of habitat destruction as a consequence of gravel extraction, weed invasion, and over collection by botanists. It is not clear why it disappeared from the Waitākere coastline.	

=== Order Santalales ===
==== Showy mistletoes (family Loranthaceae) ====
Common name	Scientific name	Range	Comments	Pictures
Adams mistletoe	Trilepidea adamsii	From the Waipoua River to the Waikato and Coromandel Peninsula in the North Island; Great Barrier Island, and Waiheke Island	Last collected in 1954 from Maungakawa, now Pukemako, in the Pakaroa Range, east of Cambridge. Habitat loss, over-collecting, loss of pollinators and dispersers, and possum browse have all been proposed as contributors to its extinction.	

=== Order Caryophyllales ===
==== Carnations (family Caryophyllaceae) ====
Scientific name	Range	Comments
Stellaria elatinoides	North Island and South Island	Last seen in the 1940s, driven to extinction by habitat destruction and possibly invasive weeds. The New Zealand Plant Conservation Network considers it a synonym of Stellaria multiflora subsp. multiflora, which survives in Australia.

=== Order Gentianales ===
==== Family Loganiaceae ====
Scientific name	Range	Comments
Logania depressa	East of Waiouru and north of Moawhango, North Island	Only collected once in 1847. The area is now largely modified tussock grassland, partially covered by a dam or invaded by Hieracium pilosella.

=== Order Boraginales ===
==== Borages and forget-me-nots (family Boraginaceae) ====
Common name	Scientific name	Range	Comments	Pictures
Waiautoa forget-me-not	Myosotis laingii	South Marlborough, South Island	Last collected in 1912. The reasons for extinction are unknown.	

== See also ==
- List of Australia-New Guinea species extinct in the Holocene
- List of Hawaiian animals extinct in the Holocene
- List of Oceanian animals extinct in the Holocene
- Holocene extinction
- Lists of extinct animals
- List of extinct bird species since 1500
- List of Late Quaternary prehistoric bird species
- New Zealand Threat Classification System
- New Zealand geologic time scale
