= Pukemako Scenic Reserve =

Coordinates: 37.86°S 175.53°E

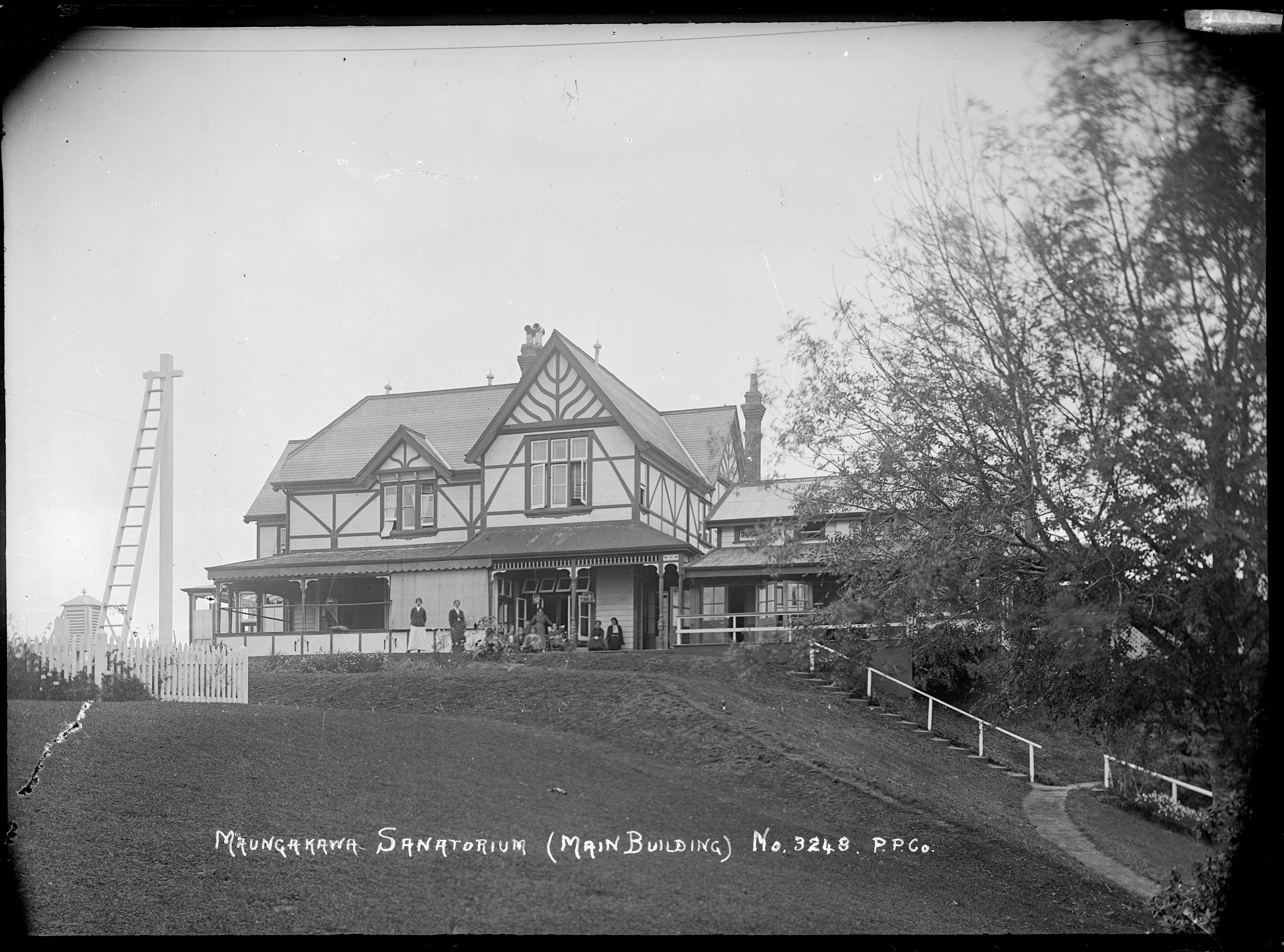
Te Waikato Sanatorium at Pukemako, view of the main building circa 1910–1930

Pukemako Scenic Reserve is located in the Waipā District, northeast of the town of Cambridge, New Zealand. Pukemako translates from Māori as “hill of the bellbird”. The 63.9108 ha (157.927 acres) reserve was renamed from Maungakawa Scenic Reserve under section 61 of Ngāti Hauā Claims Settlement Act 2014 and the neighbouring 2.8328 ha (7.000 acres) Gudex Memorial Park Historic Reserve was renamed Pukemako Historic Reserve under section 62 of the Act. Both areas are now administered by a Board appointed by Ngāti Hauā and Waipā District Council. Previously confusion had been caused, as a 495 m (1,624 ft) hill, a few kilometres to the north, is called Maungakawa. Another 535 m (1,755 ft) Maungakawa hill in the Hapuakohe Range is also in Waikato.

== History ==
In 1868 10,000 acres (4,000 ha) was bought, or leased from Māori owners by Daniel Thornton, and, after his death, a large house was put on what was later called Sanatorium Hill.

== Sanatorium ==
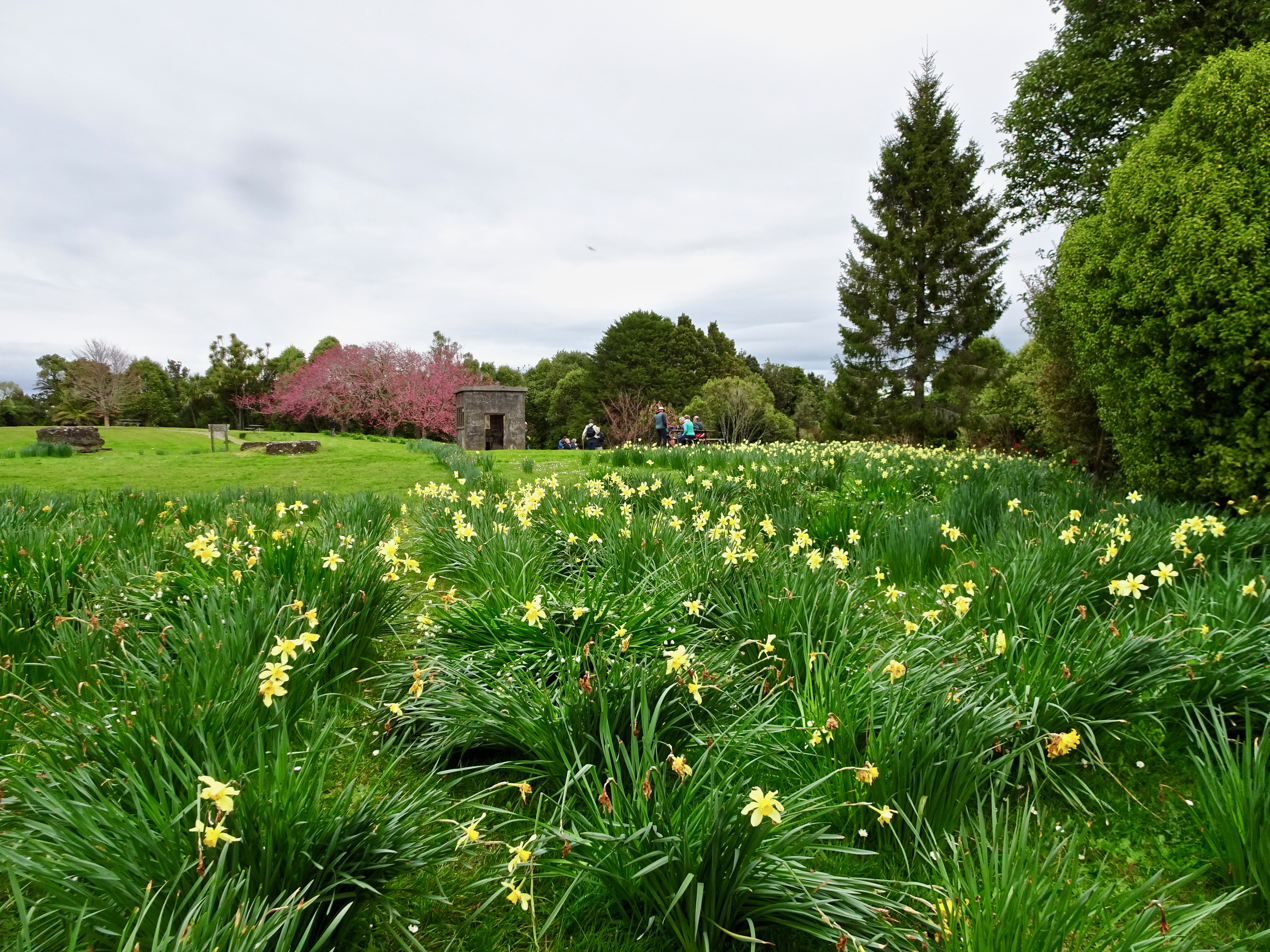
Pukemako scenic reserve and a remnant of the Sanatorium

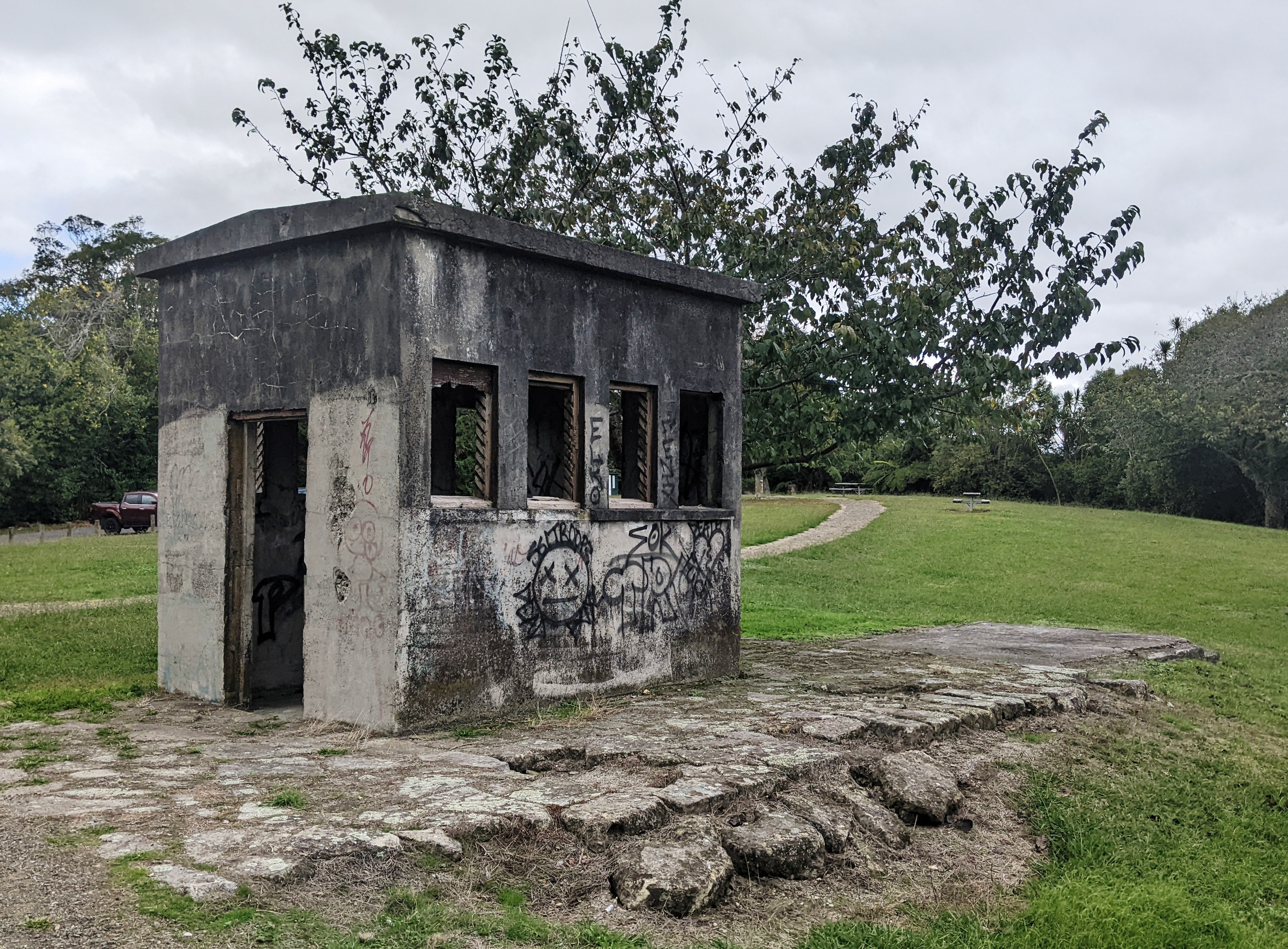
Ruins of Te Waikato Sanatorium

Te Waikato Sanatorium for tuberculosis was officially opened in 1903 by Liberal Prime Minister, Sir Joseph Ward, as one of the few the Public Health Department hospitals . Closure came in 1921, during the second Massey Ministry, when Health Minister James Parr said half the beds were empty. He was supported by Cambridge Borough Council; the Mayor saying it was a burden on the state.

== Maungakawa Scenic Reserve ==
Pukemako Scenic Reserve was originally named after the former Maungakawa estate. The reserve has a native bush walk and views over the surrounding area. It was formed in 1953. The Gudex stone obelisk was erected on Pukemako hill, when 7 acres (2.8 ha) were set aside from the reserve to become Gudex Memorial Park in 1968. On a clear day Mt Ruapehu and Mt Taranaki are visible. It commemorated the conservation work of M. C. Gudex.

=== Wildlife ===
The reserve is one of Waikato Regional Council's HALO sites, using brodifacoum and cholecalciferol to reduce rats and possums to low densities. Copper skinks may be present, but none was seen in a lizard survey in March 2025. Matai, rimu and kahikatea have been logged from the reserve and mahoe, fuchsia and kohekohe were damaged by possums from the 1950s, when mangeao was on all the higher ground, with many karaka and rewarewa, tree ferns, rata, Pseudopanax ferox and Nothopanax laetum. About 1890 kauri, puriri, pines, macrocarpa and oak were planted. Some of the oaks had as many as ten species of native ferns, orchids, and Astelia, and pines had Griselinia lucid. Trilepidea adamsii, a large-leaved native mistletoe, grew at its most southerly limit, but, due to habitat loss, over-collecting, loss of pollinators, loss of dispersers, or possum browse, it was last recorded in 1954 and is now presumed extinct. Pest control began in 2007.
