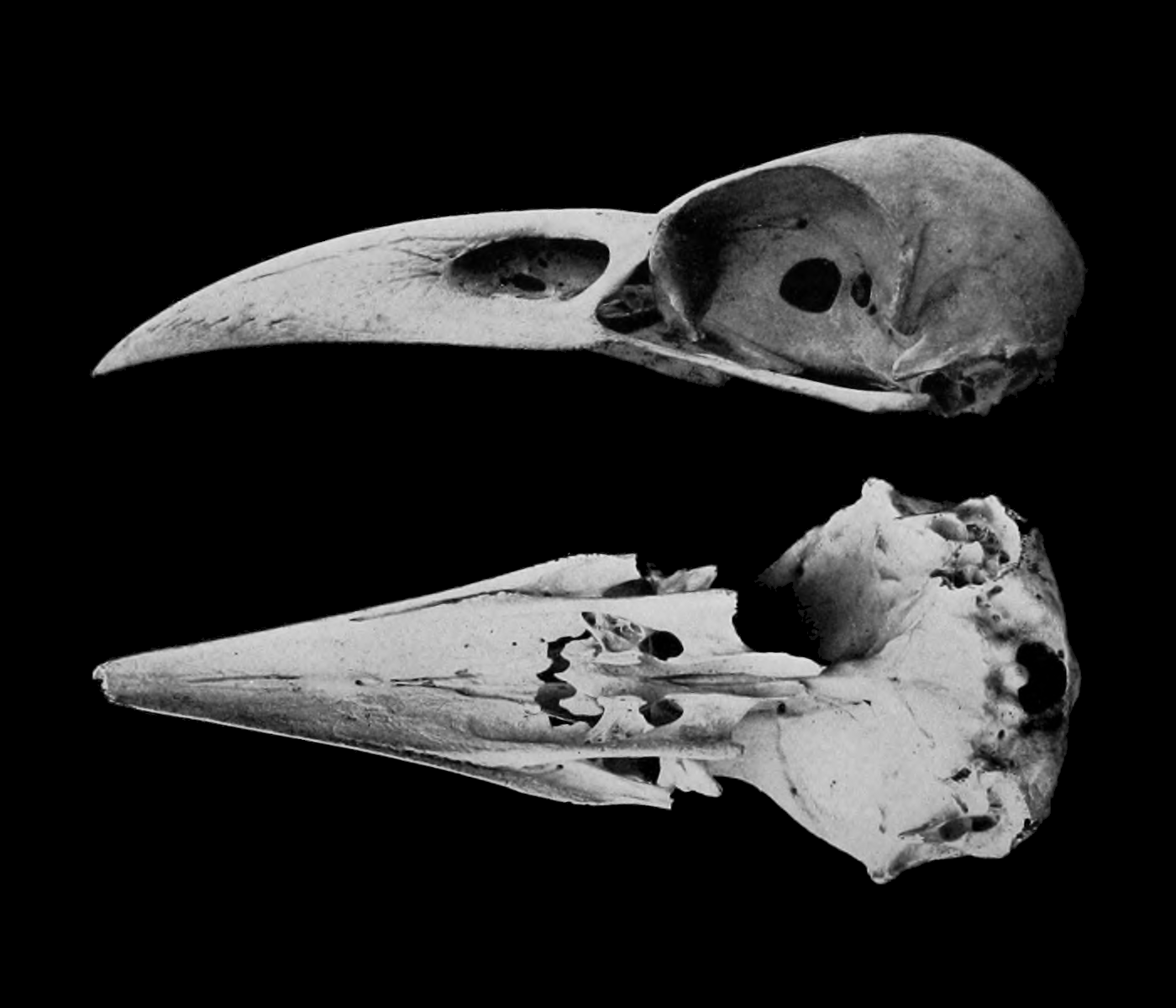
- Two skulls, from lateral (top) and ventral (bottom)

Scientific classification
- Kingdom: Animalia
- Phylum: Chordata
- Class: Aves
- Order: Passeriformes
- Family: Corvidae
- Genus: Corvus
- Species: †C. moriorum

Binomial name
- †Corvus moriorum (Forbes, 1892)

= New Zealand raven =

New Zealand raven Temporal range: Late Pleistocene-Holocene

Extinct species of bird

The New Zealand raven (Corvus moriorum) is an extinct species of crow that was endemic to New Zealand. It went extinct in the 16th century.

== Taxonomy ==
There were three subspecies: the North Island raven (Corvus moriorum antipodum), South Island raven (Corvus moriorum pycrafti), and Chatham raven (Corvus moriorum moriorum) from the Chatham Islands.

2017 genetic research determined that the three raven populations were subspecies rather than separate species, having only split 130,000 years ago. DNA evidence suggests that its closest relatives are in the clade containing the forest raven, little raven and Australian raven, from which it split around 2 million years ago.

A reconstruction of the raven is in the Museum of New Zealand Te Papa Tongarewa, specimen MNZ S.036749.

== Distribution and habitat ==
The holotype of the South Island raven is in the collection of the Museum of New Zealand Te Papa Tongarewa.

A late Holocene fossil bone of Corvus antipodum was found on Enderby Island in 1964 by New Zealand biologist Elliot Dawson. It is the only authentic record of a corvid in the Auckland Islands and is thought to represent an individual bird that reached the Auckland Islands as a vagrant.

== Description ==
The Chatham subspecies was significantly larger than the two New Zealand ones, and probably the world's fourth- or fifth-largest passerine. They had long, broad bills that were not as arched as those of the Hawaiian crow (C. hawaiiensis). Presumably, they were black all over like all of their close relatives. There do not seem to be recorded oral traditions of this species – most of the Moriori people, after whom this species was named, were eventually killed or enslaved by Māori explorers, and little of their natural history knowledge has been preserved. Thus, it cannot be completely ruled out that like some congeners, such as the pied raven, they had partially white or grey plumage.

Although this species is generally considered to have become extinct before the arrival of European colonists, there is one eyewitness record from the late 1840s in PIgeon Bay, Banks Peninsula:

Ornithologist John Healy…spent over a month with the author’s father (Mr. E. Hay, of Pigeon Bay) in 1847 or 1848, during which time he added materially to his specimens. Mr. Healy was collecting for the British Museum, and was specially anxious to secure a large black crow, which was very rare. Two of these birds had been shot before he came, and had been eaten. A few days after he had left Pigeon Bay, Peter Brown shot another, which was also eaten in a stew with pigeons, which were then very numerous. The author has only seen three of these birds, and two of those he saw after they had been shot. The third was secured by Peter Brown, and the author saw it two or three times before it was bagged. The bird was larger than a wild pigeon, and smaller than a fowl. It was glossy black, with a strong beak like a fowl’s. It had poor flight, and generally frequented the same part of the bush.

== Ecology ==
Remains of New Zealand ravens are most common in Pleistocene and Holocene coastal sites. On the coast, it may have frequented the seal and penguin colonies or fed in the intertidal zone, as does the forest raven (C. tasmanicus) of Tasmania. It may also have depended on fruit, like the New Caledonian crow (C. moneduloides), but it is difficult to understand why a fruit eater would have been most common in coastal forest and shrubland when fruit was distributed throughout the forest.

== Gallery ==
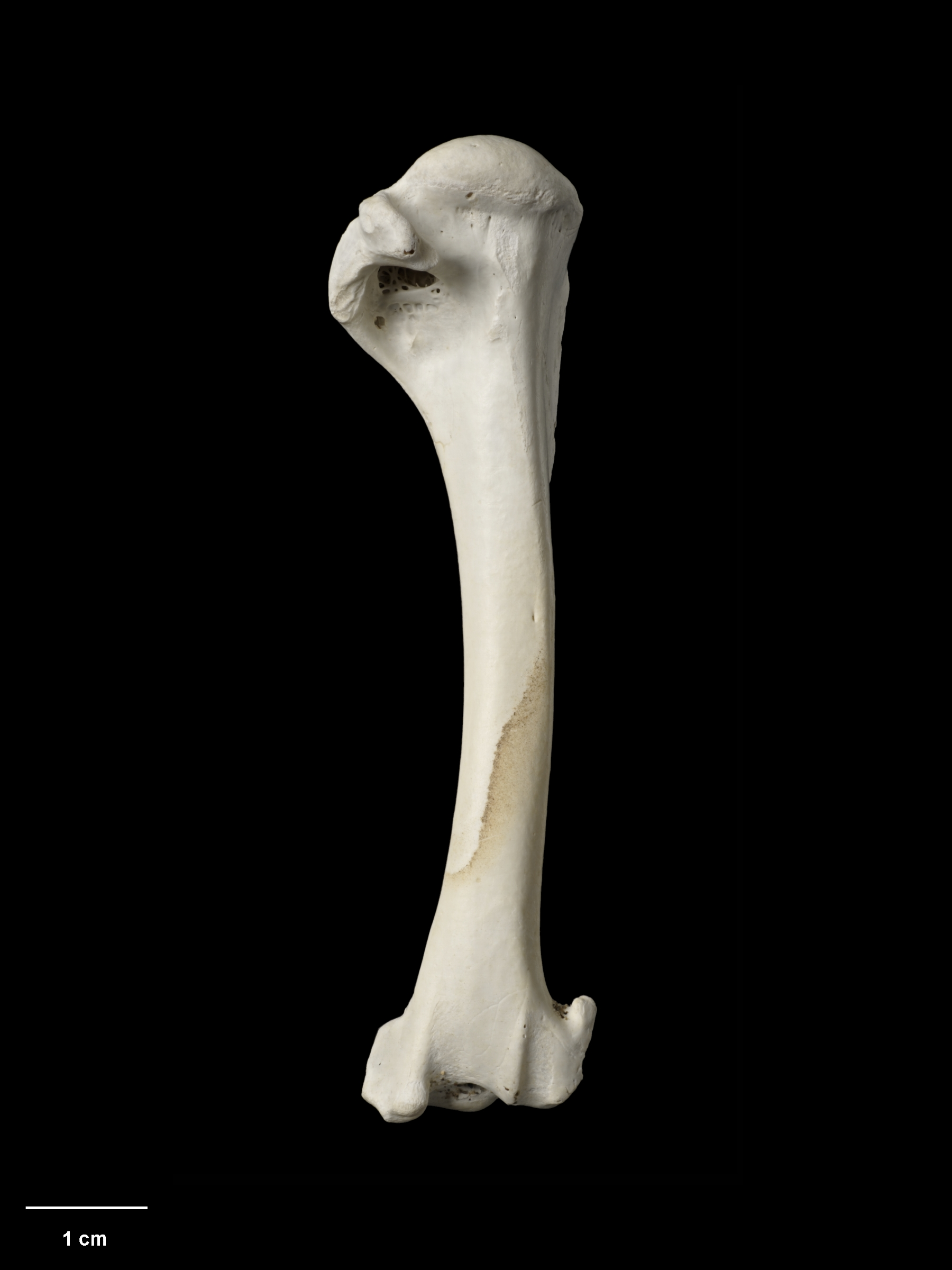
Corvus antipodum pycrafti holotype

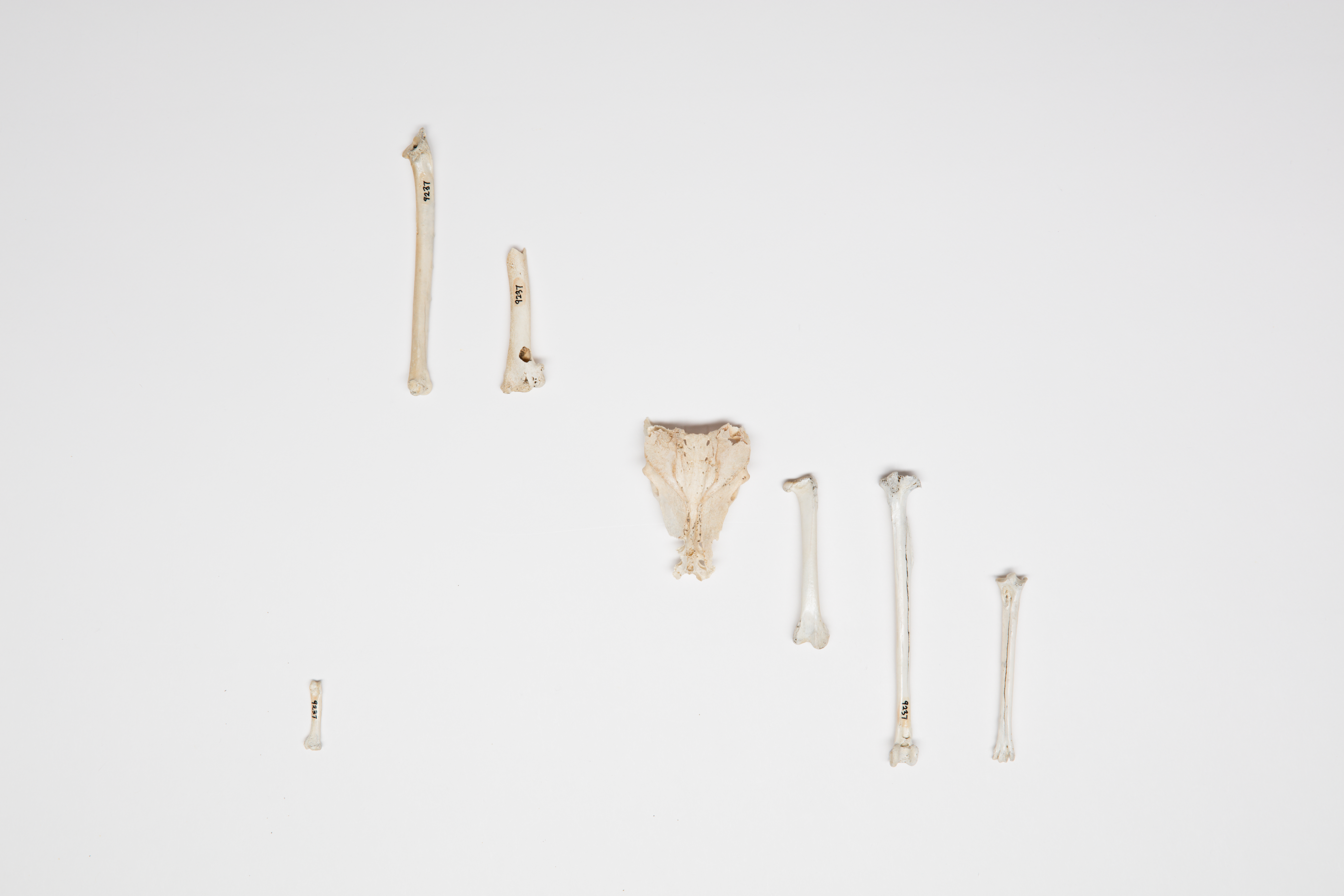
Corvus antipodum bones collected from the Aupouri Peninsula

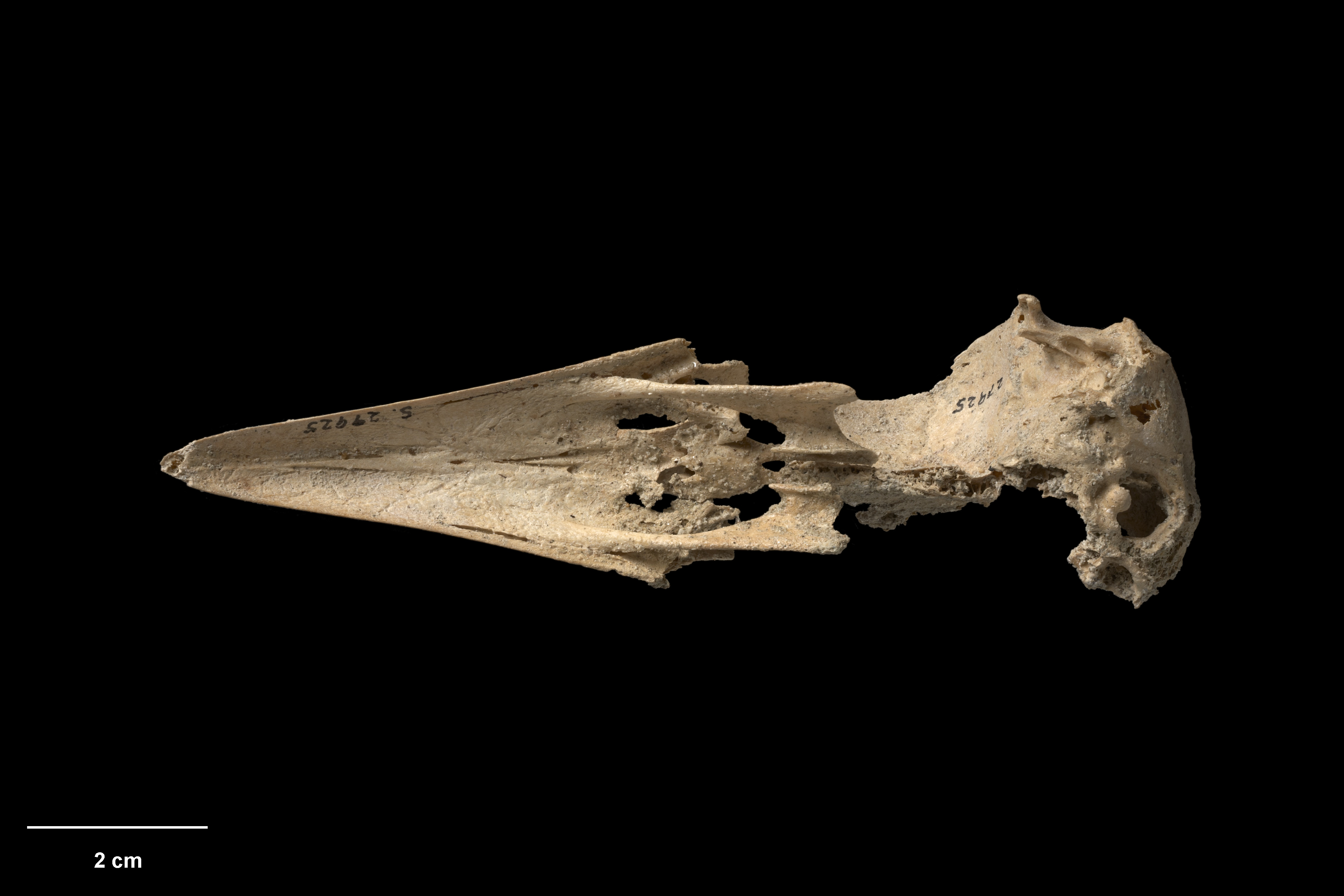
Underside view of Corvus antipodum pycrafti skull

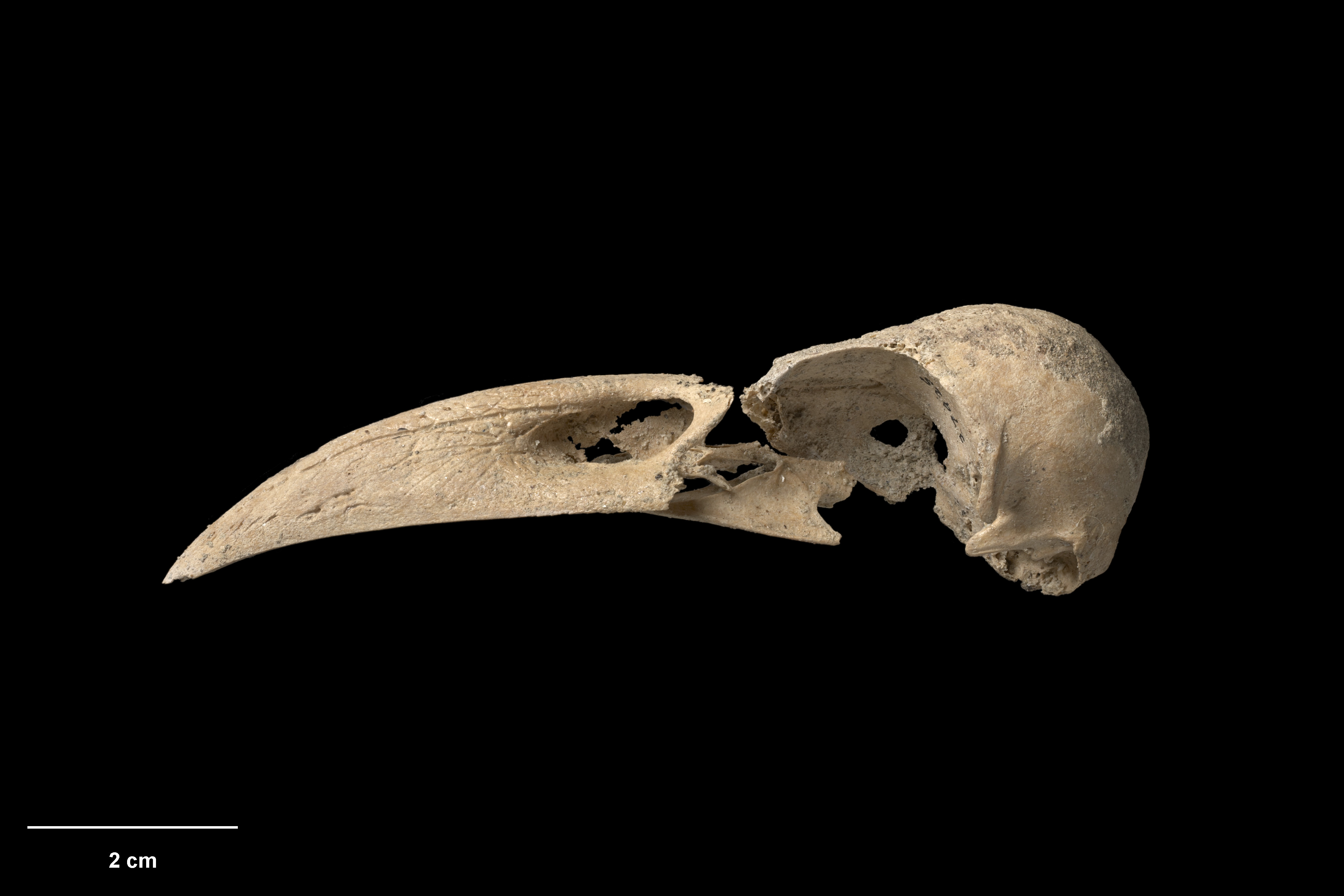
Skull of Corvus antipodum pycrofti

== See also ==
- List of Late Quaternary prehistoric bird species
- List of New Zealand animals extinct in the Holocene
