= Quercus robur subsp. pedunculiflora =

Scientific classification
- Kingdom: Plantae
- Clade: Tracheophytes
- Clade: Angiosperms
- Clade: Eudicots
- Clade: Rosids
- Order: Fagales
- Family: Fagaceae
- Genus: Quercus
- Species: Q. robur
- Subspecies: Q. r. subsp. pedunculiflora

Trinomial name
- Quercus robur subsp. pedunculiflora (K.Koch) Menitzky

Synonyms
- List: Quercus pedunculata subsp. pedunculiflora K.Koch; Quercus pedunculata var. pedunculiflora K.Koch; Quercus brutia var. pedunculiflora K.Koch; Quercus haas var. atrchoclados Borbas & Bornm; Quercus robur var. erucifolia Stev.; Quercus pedunculata f. erucifolia Stev.; Quercus pedunculata var. longipetioleata Medwedev; Quercus pedunculata f. pinnatipartita Boiss.; Quercus pedunculata var. pinnatipartita Boiss.; Quercus kurdica Wenzig; Quercus erucifolia Stev.; Quercus erucifolia subsp. longipes Stev.; Quercus longipes Stev

Subspecies of English oak

Quercus robur subsp. pedunculiflora, or Quercus pedunculiflora, the grayish oak, is a subspecies of flowering plant in the beech and oak family, Fagaceae. Its a large tree, native to South-Eastern Europe, in the Balkan Peninsula and Peloponnesos, through Thrace and Eastern Anatolia, and the Caucasus. It can be found in deciduous forest, flood plains and steppes, up to 1800 m above sea level. It is a drought adapted species, being able to tolerate extreme heat, and for this reason Q. robur subsp. pedunculiflora may become a very important tree species for forestry, particularly in the context of global climate change.

== Taxonomy ==
Quercus robur subsp. pedunculiflora is a species controversial in taxonomy. Some authors consider it as only a race of Quercus robur, the differences from the common subspecies being the result of an adaptation to drier climates and probable intermixture from other species (Quercus pubescens and Quercus petraea in the north of its range and Quercus infectoria in the south). This theory agrees with authors who noticed introgression of Quercus robur with more drought adapted oak species (Kleinschmit 1993), which took place at the time of the migration of Quercus robur into the Quercus pubescens area and vice versa. Almost all characteristics which distinguish the subspecies from Quercus robur subsp. robur, are typical of Quercus pubescens.

The very low level of genetic divergence between Q. robur subsp. robur and Q. robur subsp. pedunculiflora populations suggests that the process of ecological speciation is not completed.

== Description ==
The petiole length can range up to 3 cm long in Q. robur subsp. pedunculiflora but sometimes only 2 mm longer that the common subspecies, with its peduncle being 2 to 6 cm long. While Q. robur subsp. robur leaves show almost no pubescence on the abaxial surface, Q. robur subsp. pedunculiflora leaves are densely pubescent with its dimensions being 8-17 x 6-9 cm. Its leaves are dark green above and yellow grey tomentose beneath. It has smaller auricles than Q. robur subsp. robur. The acorns are solitary or in a pair, rarely in a group of 3 to 4, and can take up to 10 years between mast years. Other differences from Q. robur subsp. robur include having a longer lamina, more and wider lobes, deeper sinuses and thicker bark.

== Habitat ==
Quercus robur subsp. pedunculiflora is listed in Southern Albania, in Serbia near Belgrade and in the Srem region of Vojvodina province, in Greece in Corfu island and Nestos Delta in the north-east of the country, in Bulgaria in the Black Sea area, in Slovakia, in Romania in the Balkan-Moesic province from Southern Oltenia through Muntenia to the southern part of Moldova, in the Czech Republic, in Ukraine in Crimea, in Turkey in East and South-East Anatolia. In the Caucasian Region Quercus robur subsp. pedunculiflora is observed in Georgia and in the west of Azerbaijan, Northern Armenia, Dagestan and in the north-west of Iran. Grayish oak enters in fragments of floodplain forests in the North of Greece, in Serbia, in the Thracian Lowland and the forests of the Ayazmo Park in Bulgaria. Also in Romania grayish oak enters in floodplain forests in the alluvial forests of Fraxinus angustifolia, near the Black Sea and also in the wooded steppe layer. In Georgia Quercus robur subsp. pedunculiflora occurs in floodplain forests in the eastern part of the country, on the alluvial plains of the rivers Iori, Alazani, Kura and along the Kura river in Azerbaijan.
