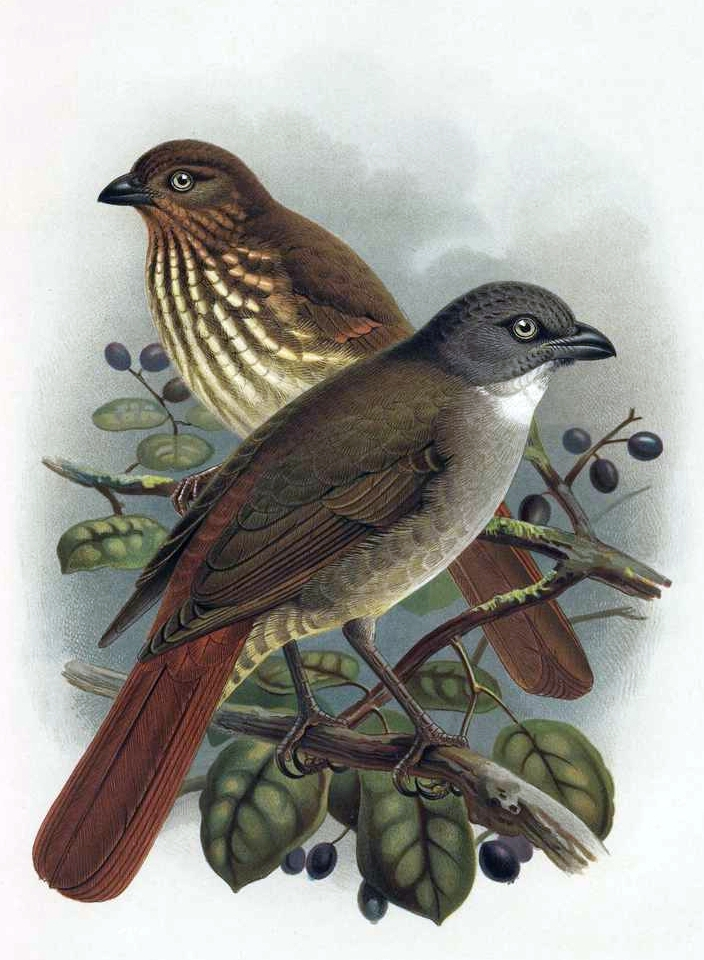
- North Island piopio in front, South Island piopio at rear

Scientific classification
- Kingdom: Animalia
- Phylum: Chordata
- Class: Aves
- Order: Passeriformes
- Family: Oriolidae
- Genus: †Turnagra; Lesson, 1837

Species
- See text

Synonyms
- Keropia Gray, 1840; Otagon Bonaparte, 1850

= Piopio (bird) =

Piopio Temporal range: Holocene

Extinct genus of birds endemic to New Zealand

The piopio or turnagras are an extinct genus of passerine birds in the family Oriolidae, that were endemic to New Zealand. Sometimes described as New Zealand thrushes, the piopio had only a coincidental, passing resemblance to the thrush family.

== Taxonomy and systematics ==
Piopio were a long-standing taxonomic mystery. Until 2011, the IOC regarded their monotypic family Turnagridae as incertae sedis (of uncertain placement). The genus Turnagra was then placed in the family Oriolidae after it was determined that the piopio were closely related to the figbirds. They have been said to have more in common with the bowerbird family of Australia, but they differ in terms of nest construction, egg marking, and voice. A relationship has also been suggested with the whistlers (Pachycephalidae). The piopio were formerly considered to be a single species until split into separate North and South Island species in 2012.

The specific names of both species were based on mistakes; Turnagra capensis was so named because Anders Sparrman mixed up his specimens and thought the bird had been collected in South Africa (capensis referring to the Cape of Good Hope). The North Island's Turnagra tanagra was so named because it was thought to be related to the tanagers of the Americas. The vernacular name is derived from the Māori name, piopio-kata.

=== Extinct species ===
The genus Turnagra contains two extinct species:

- †North Island piopio (Turnagra tanagra)
- †South Island piopio (Turnagra capensis)

== Behaviour and ecology ==
Little is known about their biology. They frequented the undergrowth and forest floor. Their nests were well constructed cups placed in trees a few metres from the ground, in which two to four eggs were laid. Walter Buller described their calls as being among the most beautiful of any New Zealand bird. They were also able to mimic the calls of other birds. They were omnivorous, with records of them hawking for insects over a river, as well as eating spiders, fruit and oats.

== Status ==
Extensive deforestation throughout the country (particularly in the lowlands) and the introduction of mammalian predators, particularly rats, to North Island and South Island in the 19th century during the period of European settlement are believed to have caused the extinctions of both species. The last verified North Island piopio was shot in 1902, although poorly documented sightings were reported as late as the 1970s. The South Island piopio was last recorded in 1905. Plans to move birds to predator-free islands were mooted but either never acted on or were derailed due to the lack of suitable sanctuaries.
