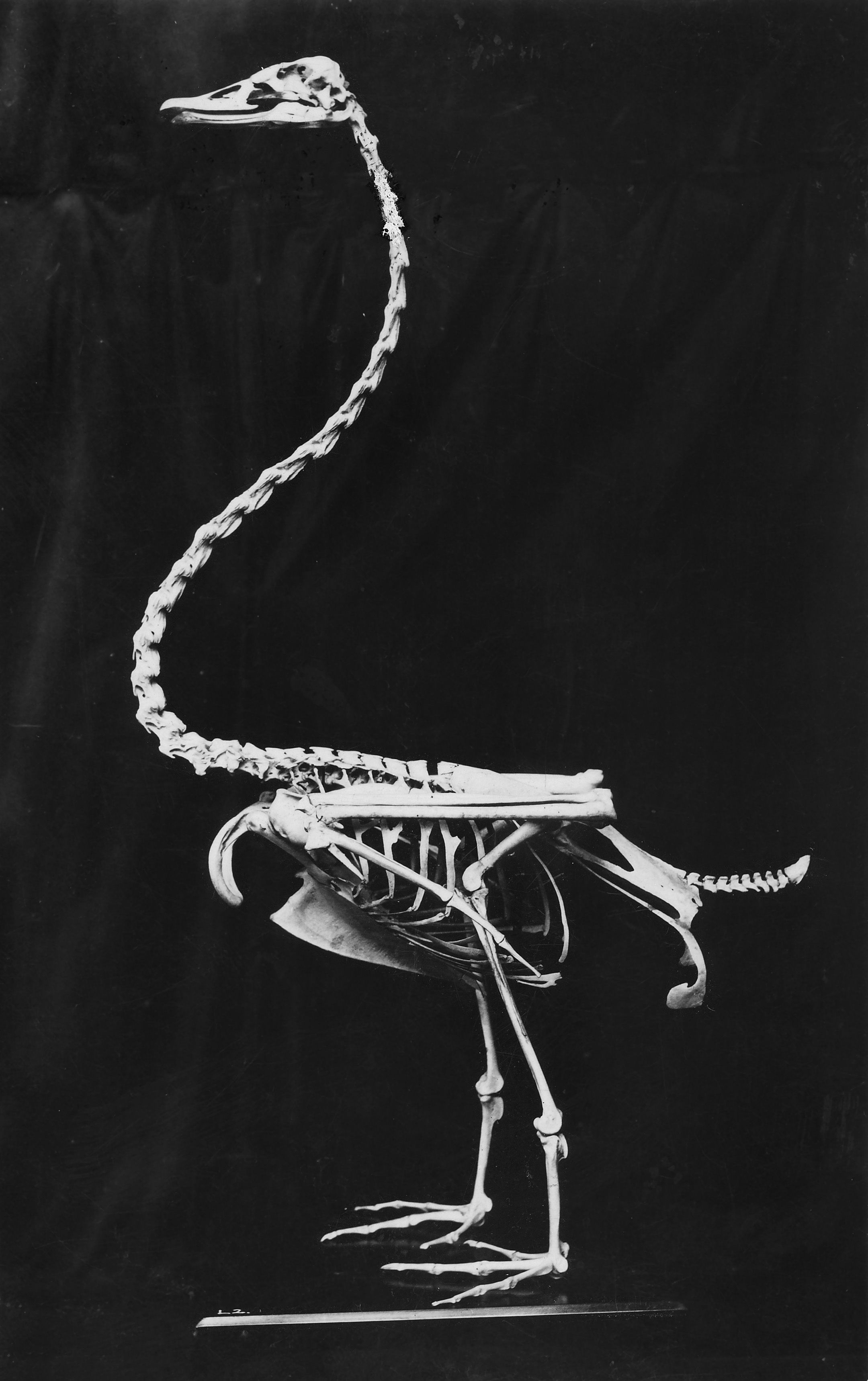

Conservation status
- Extinct (1650 CE)

Scientific classification
- Kingdom: Animalia
- Phylum: Chordata
- Class: Aves
- Order: Anseriformes
- Family: Anatidae
- Genus: Cygnus
- Species: †C. sumnerensis

Binomial name
- †Cygnus sumnerensis (Forbes, 1890)

Synonyms
- Chenopis sumnerensis; Cygnus atratus sumnerensis; Cygnus chathamensis

= New Zealand swan =

New Zealand swan Temporal range: Pleistocene-Holocene

Extinct species of swan

The New Zealand swan (Moriori: poūwa, Cygnus sumnerensis) is an extinct indigenous swan from the Chatham Islands and the South Island of New Zealand. Discovered as archaeological remains in 1889, it was originally considered a separate species from the Australian black swan (Cygnus atratus) because of its slightly larger bones, and swans not having been introduced to New Zealand until 1864. From 1998 until 2017, it was considered to be simply a New Zealand population of Cygnus atratus, until DNA recovered from fossil bones determined that it was indeed a separate species, much larger and heavier than its Australian relative.

== Description ==
Based on numerous bone measurements, C. sumnerensis was distinctly larger than its Australian relative, weighing an estimated 10 kg to the 6 kg of C. atratus, a clear display of island gigantism. Standing about 1 m tall, it was "more like a rugby player compared with the Australian swan's (Cygnus atratus) smaller and slender soccer-player physique." It had relatively shorter wings and longer legs, suggesting it was evolving on a path towards flightlessness, as with other New Zealand waterfowl like Finsch's duck (Chenonetta finschi) and the New Zealand goose (Cnemiornis). Although likely to have the same black plumage as C. atratus, this cannot be determined from subfossil bones.

Until recently it was thought that the presence of C. atratus in New Zealand represented one of the very rare cases of a species replacing itself after extinction. After the extinction of the poūwa, there is some evidence occasional vagrant swans arrived from Australia, but it was not until after its deliberate introduction in the 1860s that C. atratus became established and increased to a population of approximately 50,000 today. Whether C. atratus functions as an ecological surrogate of its extinct relative is unknown. Judging by the presence of their bones in middens, New Zealand swans were driven extinct by the first Polynesian settlers around AD 1450 on the mainland and AD 1650 on the Chatham Islands.

== Taxonomy ==
=== Discovery ===
The first fossil swan bones in New Zealand were recovered from Monck's Cave, Sumner, near Christchurch, in September 1889. The landowner Henry Monck had discovered bones which he presented to John T. Meeson and Henry Forbes, Director of the Canterbury Museum. They were found associated with moa and fish bones, seal hair, adzes, spears, and sinkers, indicating the swans were hunted by early Māori inhabitants of the cave. Forbes described the new swan species from three coracoids and two partial humeri, naming it Chenopis sumnerensis, from its resemblance to the Australian black swan Chenopis atrata (now Cygnus atratus) and from the type locality of Sumner. Forbes noted that "This Sumner cave has been closed since the introduction of Chenopsis atrata into New Zealand [in 1864–1868]" so the bones could not be from introduced black swans; he also noted that they were larger than those of the Australian species.

=== Synonymy ===
By the 1950s, Forbes's type material was considered lost, so Oliver in 1955 declared C. sumnerensis a nomen nudum, and redescribed the species, using fossil bones from the Chatham Islands, as Cygnus chathamensis. A few years later, Forbes's specimens were rediscovered, and C. chathamensis became a junior synonym of C. sumnerensis. In 1998, Worthy compared a large collection of C. sumnerensis from Marfells Beach near Lake Grassmere with Australian swan bones, but could not find any marked differences in size or proportion. The species was thenceforth considered to be a population of the black swan that had colonised New Zealand in prehistoric times and been exterminated by early Māori settlers, and all New Zealand subfossil swan bones were assigned to C. atratus.

=== Revival of species name ===
Recovery of ancient DNA from 39 fossil bones in museums allowed the relationship between New Zealand and Australian swans to be re-examined, and it turned out the mainland New Zealand and Chatham Islands populations formed a distinct group, separated from the Australian birds by perhaps 1–2 million years. They proved sufficiently different from Cygnus atratus to be designated a separate and genetically distinct species, and the name C. sumnerensis was revived, with two separate subspecies (C. s. sumnerensis and C. s. chathamensis) for the mainland New Zealand and Chatham Islands birds, respectively. The researchers chose the Moriori name poūwa for the species, from a legend of a large bird that lived in Te Whanga lagoon on Chatham Island, and whose bones could still be found in the sand dunes.

== See also ==
- Cygnus falconeri
- Pleistocene megafauna
- Largest prehistoric animals
