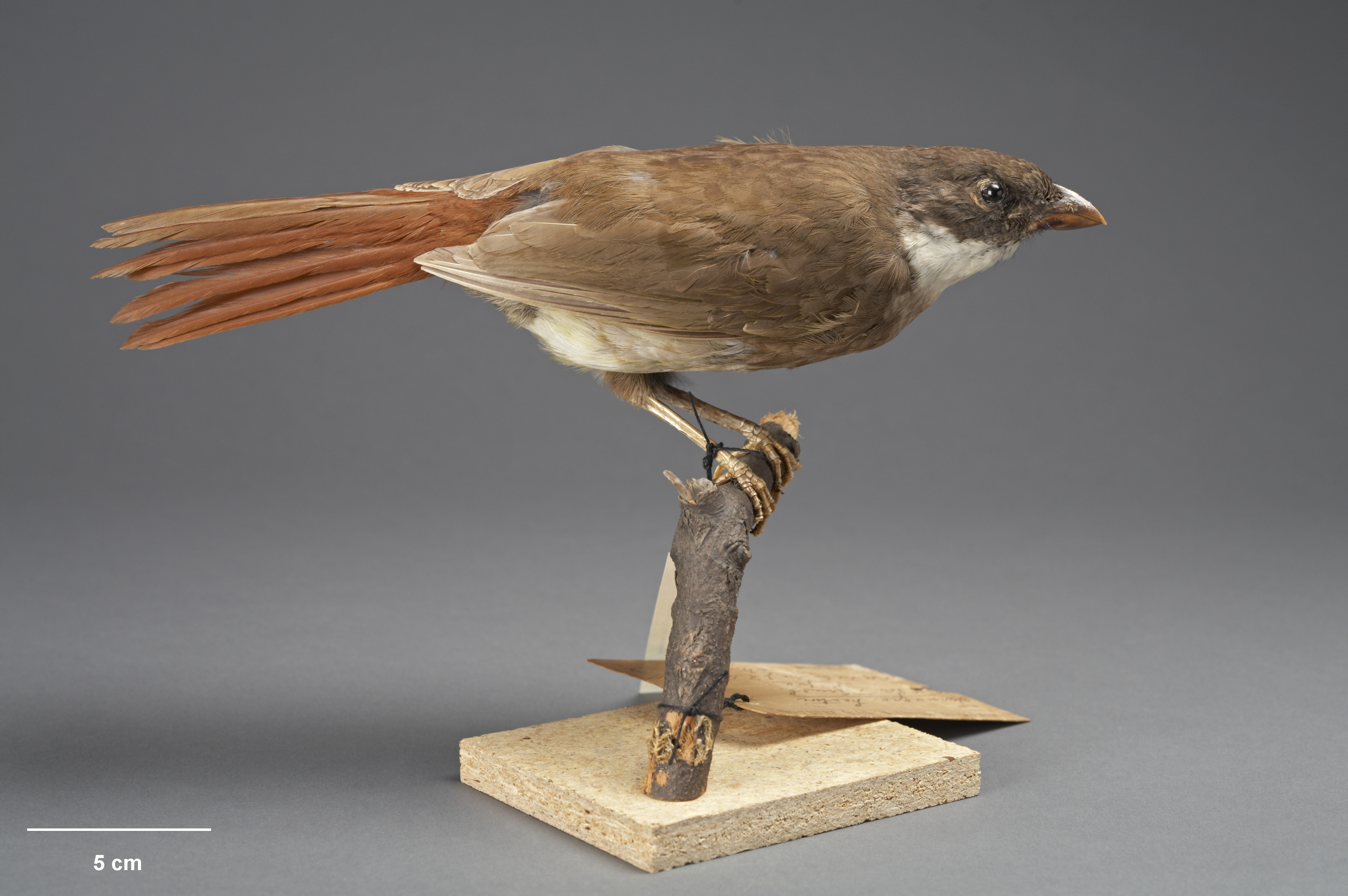
- A mounted specimen of the North Island piopio in the collection of Te Papa

Conservation status
- Extinct (1955) (IUCN 3.1)

Scientific classification
- Kingdom: Animalia
- Phylum: Chordata
- Class: Aves
- Order: Passeriformes
- Family: Oriolidae
- Genus: †Turnagra
- Species: †T. tanagra

Binomial name
- †Turnagra tanagra (Schlegel, 1866)

Synonyms
- Otagon tanagra; Turdus crassirostus turnagra; Turnagra capensis tanagra; Turnagra capensis turnagra; Turnagra Hectori; Turnagra turnagra

= North Island piopio =

Extinct species of bird

The North Island piopio (Turnagra tanagra) is an extinct species of passerine bird of the family Oriolidae.

== Taxonomy and systematics ==
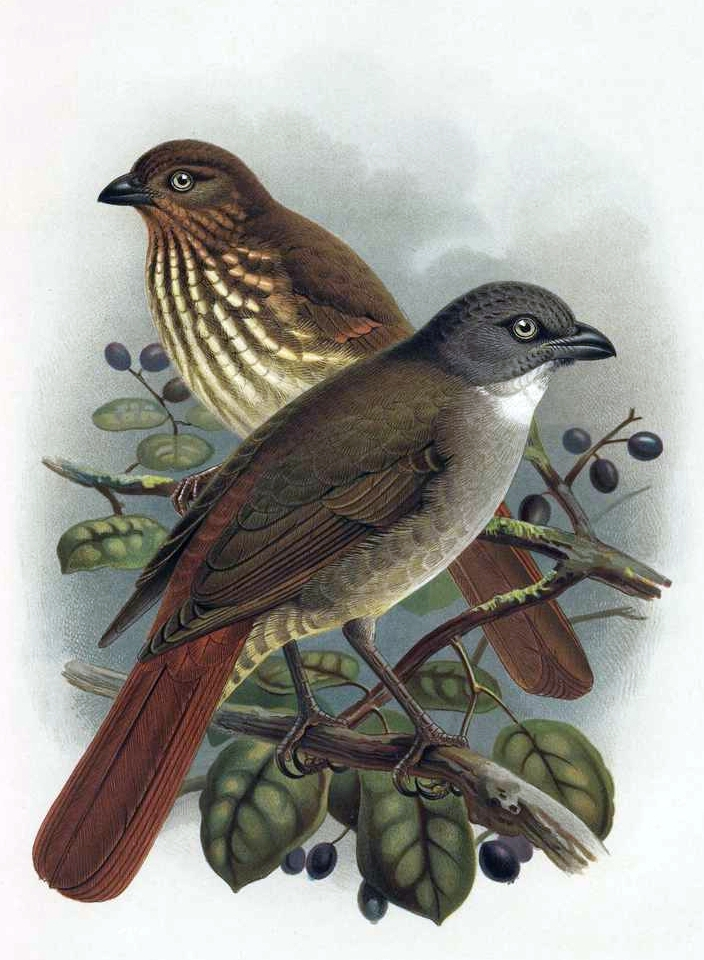
North Island piopio in front, South Island piopio at rear.

For many years, the North Island piopio was considered to be conspecific with the South Island piopio, but the two are now regarded as two separate species due to their pronounced differences in external appearance and osteology (Olson et al., 1983). An alternate name for the North Island piopio is the North Island thrush.

== Status ==
The North Island piopio was endemic to the North Island of New Zealand and was described by Walter Buller as being common in 1873, although only a few specimens were ever collected, and it declined rapidly after that time (Buller, 1888). The last specimens were collected in 1900, or more probably in 1885/1886 (Medway, 1968), and by the 1960s only around 27 specimens remained in museums worldwide. Occasional sight records of people claiming to have seen the bird (e.g. Sopp, 1957) persisted until 1970 (Bell & Singleton, 1974; Olsen 1993), but the North Island piopio is now considered extinct. Its last stronghold appears to have been the area that later became the Whanganui National Park, possibly extending north-east to the Hauhungaroa Range west of Lake Taupō. The introduction of foreign predatory mammals such as cats and rats to New Zealand's North Island is mostly to blame for the North Island piopio's extinction, with habitat loss and predation by mustelids also being significant from the 1880s onward.
