= General Grant (sailing ship) =

American bark

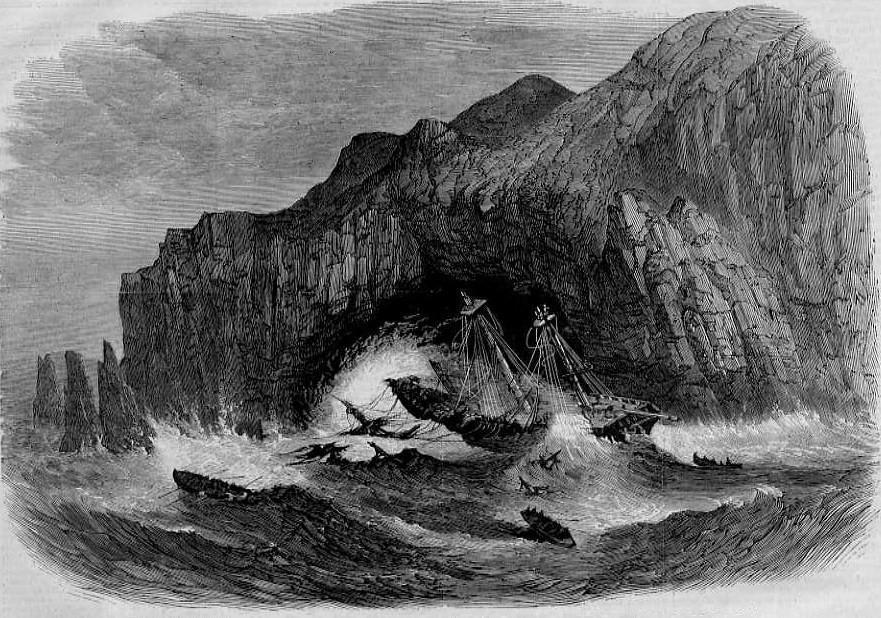
- Wreck of General Grant

History

United States
- Owner: Boyes, Richardson & Co
- Builder: Built in Maine
- Launched: 1864
- Fate: Wrecked 13 May 1866, Auckland Island

General characteristics
- Type: Bark
- Tons burthen: 1,005 tons
- Length: 179 ft 6 in (54.71 m)
- Beam: 34 ft 6 in (10.52 m)
- Draft: 21 ft 6 in (6.55 m)

General Grant was a 1,005-ton three-masted bark built in Maine in the United States in 1864 and registered in Boston, Massachusetts. It was named after Ulysses S. Grant and owned by Messers Boyes, Richardson & Co. She had a timber hull with a length of 179.5 ft, beam of 34.5 ft and depth of 21.5 ft. While on her way from Melbourne to London, General Grant crashed into a cliff on the west coast of main island of the Auckland Islands of New Zealand, and subsequently sank as a result. Sixty-eight people drowned and only 15 people survived.

== Wreck ==
The ship departed Melbourne on 4 May 1866 bound for London via Cape Horn, under the command of Captain William H. Loughlin. It was carrying 58 passengers and 25 crew, along with a cargo of wool, skins, 2,576 ounces (73.028 kg) of gold, and 9 tons of zinc spelter ballast. Included in the passenger list were a number of successful miners from the Australian gold fields.

At 11pm on 13 May 1866, the Auckland Islands were sighted dead ahead. With only light winds, the crew were unable to change course, and eventually collided against the cliffs and drifted into a large cave on Auckland Island's western shore. The rising tide and increasing swell caused the mainmast to hit the cave roof repeatedly until the mast forced a hole through the hull; the ship sank on 14 May 1866. Although the weather remained calm, the boats were not launched immediately on the ship entering the cave as it was very dark, there was no obvious landing place, and pieces of spars and rock were falling down continually.

Once daylight arrived the three boats on board were prepared for launch. The boats consisted of two quarter boats (each 22 feet long) and a longboat of 30 feet. One of the quarter boats was launched first and sent outside to see if landing could be made. The boat was expected to return for more people but instead waited outside the cave as no landing could be found. By this time the swell was increasing. The second quarter boat took a number of passengers and crew, including Mrs Jewell, to the first boat for transfer. The longboat was lying on the quarterdeck and was filled with passengers. The ship was sinking fast, and the longboat floated off General Grant's decks. Unfortunately, the longboat was swamped with water just after getting clear of the ship. The second quarter boat stayed out of the danger area, but three people (David Ashworth, Aaron Hayman, and William Sanguily) were able to swim through the surf to the quarter boat. A total of fifteen people, including 9 crew and 6 passengers, survived the wreck. The captain did not leave the ship.

== Passengers and crew ==
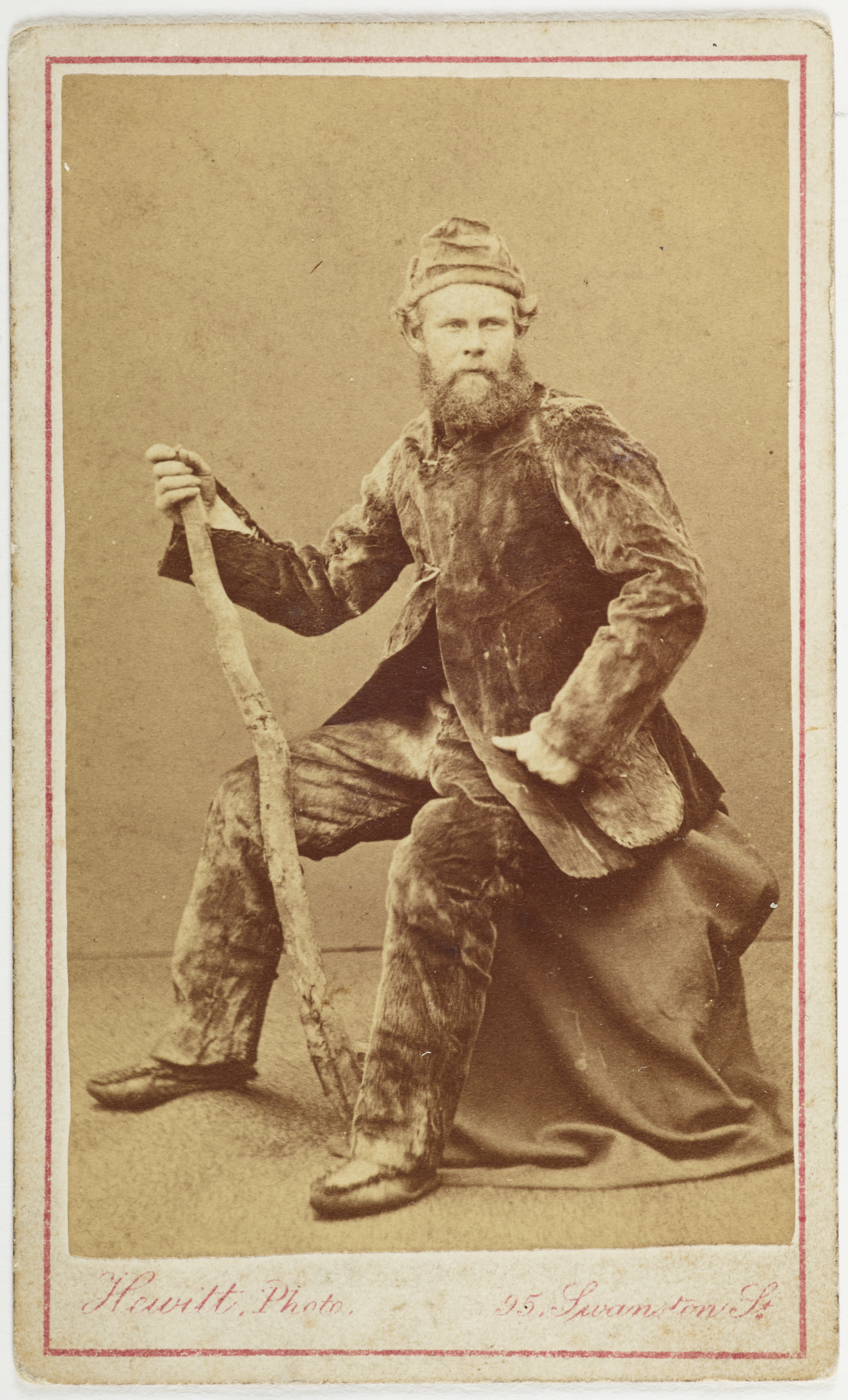
David Ashworth, a survivor of the "General Grant", circa 1875, Australia, by Charles Hewitt. Te Papa (O.005270)

The list of those on General Grant includes:

- William H. Loughlin of New York – Captain – Drowned at time of wreck
- Bartholmew Brown of Boston – First officer – Lost at sea attempting to reach New Zealand
- B. F. Jones of Massachusetts – Second officer – Drowned at time of wreck
- Magnes Anderson of Sweden – Carpenter – Drowned at time of wreck
- Keding – Steward – Drowned at time of wreck
- William Newton Scott of Shields (also reported as W. Newton Smith) – Able-bodied seaman – Lost at sea attempting to reach New Zealand
- William Ferguson – Able-bodied seaman – Survived
- Cornelius Drew – Able-bodied seaman – Survived
- Peter McNevin of Islay – Able-bodied seaman – Lost at sea attempting to reach New Zealand
- Andrew Morison of Glasgow – Able-bodied seaman – Lost at sea attempting to reach New Zealand
- David McLelland of Ayr, Scotland – Able-bodied seaman – Died on the Island
- William Murdoch Sanguilly – Able-bodied seaman – Survived. Mr Sanguilly was originally from Cuba and eventually made his way to Melbourne, Australia, thereby becoming the first Cuban resident in Australia.
- Aaron Hayman (also reported as A. Harpman)- Ordinary seaman - Survived
- Corn – Drowned at time of wreck
- Purser – Drowned at time of wreck
- Cook – Drowned at time of wreck
- Assistant Cook – Drowned at time of wreck
- Mrs Brown – Passenger (wife of First Officer, Bartholmew Brown)- Drowned at time of wreck
- Joseph Harvey Jewell – Able-bodied seaman – Survived. Died 15 January 1898 at Clovelly
- Mrs Mary Ann Jewell – Passenger (wife of Able-bodied Seaman Joseph Jewell) – Survived. She is often reported as a stewardess but this is disputed. She did pay for her passage but had to sign articles of employment as a stewardess to accompany her husband – a member of the crew – but she did not act as stewardess.
- James Teer – Passenger - Survived
- Frederick Patrick Caughey – Passenger – Survived
- David Ashworth – Passenger – Survived
- Nicholas Allen – Passenger – Survived
- Mrs Oat and four children – Passengers – Drowned at time of wreck
- Mrs Allen and three children – Passengers – Drowned at time of wreck
- Mr & Mrs Oldfield and two children – Passengers – Drowned at time of wreck
- Mr Laing – Passenger – Drowned at time of wreck
- Mr Mitchell – Passenger – Drowned at time of wreck
- other drowned Cabin passengers, Mr and Mrs. William Ray, Rev. Paul Sarda, Mr. J. Edel, Mr. W. Deans, Lieutenant-Colonel Frederick Johnstone, John Tebbutt, John Woodrow and A. and Emile Morini.
- other drowned Steerage passengers, W. Stevenson, Charles Newman, James Bayles, Richard Jeffries, Matthew Hamilton, John Harvey, Thomas Batchelor, Samuel Templeton, James Barry, Auguste, Clemeace, George, Clemence, Emily and Arthur Lawson, Elizabeth, Ann, John and Francis Roberts, Nicholas Allen, William Frost, D. Rushworth, H. Kent, W. Main, P. Kelly, P. Wise, K. Kreutz, Caroline, Elizabeth and William Smith.
- other drowned Crew, B. Mulligan, J. Turner, W. Dutnald, T. Jackson, D. Mather. B. Smith, F. C Collins, W. Burton, S. Whitney, S. Dodd and J. Davidson.

== Castaway ==
After the sinking of the ship and the capsizing of the longboat, the remaining two quarter boats pulled up outside the cave and decided to row for Disappointment Island. They reached there at dark and then the next day made for the Auckland Island and Port Ross. They arrived there after three days and two nights. After exploring, the group found two huts at Port Ross and, on 13 July 1866 Musgrave's hut. The group split in two in order to keep watch for passing ships. After nine months ashore, four of the crew decided to attempt to sail to New Zealand in one of the quarter boats. They set sail on 22 January 1867 without a compass, chart, or nautical instrument of any kind and were never seen again. Another survivor, David McLelland, died of illness on 3 September 1867. He was 62.

The ten remaining survivors moved to Enderby Island, where they lived on seals and pigs. On 19 November, they sighted the cutter Fanny, but she did not see their signals. The brig Amherst noticed their signals on 21 November 1867 and rescued the group.

As a result of this shipwreck and two previous wrecks (Grafton and Invercauld), the New Zealand government established a network of castaway depots and regular visits by government vessels to the subantarctic islands to relieve further shipwreck victims.

== General Grant's treasure ==
The wreck of General Grant has been the focus of treasure-hunters seeking its cargo of gold bullion, with an estimated 2,576 ounces (73.0 kg) of gold believed to be on board. In 2022 it was estimated that at least 30 attempts had been made to locate the wreck.

The first expedition to find the wreck was launched by the tug Southland in 1869, sailing from Bluff. The following year, the schooner Daphne left Bluff for the Auckland Islands and lost six men when one of its boats was swamped, including David Ashworth who was one of the survivors of the original wreck. In 1907, twelve men were drowned when the ship Dundonald foundered on the western shore of Disappointment Island.

In 1908, Danish-born adventurer Niels Peter Sorensen sought to raise funds in New York City for an expedition to the Auckland Islands. Sorensen had "a map purporting to show the whereabouts of the wreck (which has never been precisely located) and claimed that it held $20 million worth of gold bars and minted guineas". His history of fraud was exposed in The Sun and the expedition did not proceed, although he attempted to raise funds for another expedition in New Zealand in 1912.

In 1960, the New Zealand government banned private expeditions to the islands on the grounds that "such expeditions were too perilous and hopeless to be practicable". However, in 1975 the Department of Lands and Survey authorised a further expedition in 1975 on MV Acheron, where they "found a number of small items including a ship's chronometer that they were reasonably confident came from the General Grant". Bill Day was involved in five expeditions between 1986 and 2022 without finding General Grant, although he did find the wreck of Rifleman, another ship which had been lost in 1833.
