= List of shipwrecks in March 1887 =

The list of shipwrecks in March 1887 includes ships sunk, foundered, grounded, or otherwise lost during March 1887.

== 1 March ==
List of shipwrecks: 1 March 1887
Ship	State	Description
Grace Darling	United Kingdom	The fishing boat collided with the steamship Schleswig (United Kingdom) and sank 3 nautical miles (5.6 km) east of the Isle of May, Fife. Her crew were rescued by Schleswig.
W. H. Gardner	United States	The steamship was destroyed by fire in the Tombigbee River three miles (4.8 km) south of Gainesville, Alabama when a bale of cotton caught fire and a deckhand attempted to extinguish it but caught fire himself. He ran spreading the fire through the ship. Some survivors were rescued by a boat from Tally (United States). Eight passengers and thirteen crew died.

== 2 March ==
List of shipwrecks: 2 March 1887
Ship	State	Description
Britannia	Sweden	The schooner was abandoned in the Atlantic Ocean (37°00′N 42°20′W). Her seven crew were rescued by the brig Lutzberg (Germany). Britannia was on a voyage from Pensacola, Florida, United States to Amsterdam, North Holland, Netherlands.

== 3 March ==
List of shipwrecks: 3 March 1887
Ship	State	Description
Egypt	United Kingdom	The steamship foundered in the Atlantic Ocean. Her crew were rescued by the barque Hannah Blanchard (Flag unknown). Egypt was on a voyage from New York, United States to Lisbon, Portugal.

== 4 March ==
List of shipwrecks: 4 March 1887
Ship	State	Description
Avocet	United Kingdom	The steamship ran aground on a reef in the Red Sea (14°21′N 42°38′E). She was refloated but consequently foundered. Her crew were rescued by the steamship St. Oswald (United Kingdom). Avocet was on a voyage from Middlesbrough, Yorkshire to Madras and Calcutta, India.
Martino XIII	Brazil	The barque foundered in the Atlantic Ocean. Her nine crew were rescued the next day by Lizzie (United Kingdom).
Rosario	Spain	The ship was run into by the steamship Glenmavis (United Kingdom) and sank in the Bristol Channel 5 nautical miles (9.3 km) west of Lundy Island, Devon, United Kingdom. Her crew were rescued by the steamship Boucan (France). Rosario was on a voyage from Cardiff, Glamorgan, United Kingdom to Alcúdia, Mallorca.
St. Louis	United Kingdom	The ship departed from Huelva, Spain for Port Talbot, Glamorgan. No further trace, reported overdue.

== 5 March ==
List of shipwrecks: 5 March 1887
Ship	State	Description
Lizzie Iredale	United Kingdom	The ship departed from Newcastle, New South Wales for San Diego, California, United States. No further trace, reported missing.

== 6 March ==
List of shipwrecks: 6 March 1887
Ship	State	Description
Garrawalt	United Kingdom	The steamship struck a sunken rock and foundered off Port Lethen, Kincardineshire. Her crew survived She was on a voyage from Sunderland, County Durham to Aberdeen.

== 8 March ==
List of shipwrecks: 8 March 1887
Ship	State	Description
Mari Vagliano	Flag unknown	The steamship struck a sunken rock off Ouessant, Finistère, France. She was on a voyage from Constanţa, Romania to the River Thames. She completed her voyage in a leaky condition.
Tynedale	United Kingdom	The steamship foundered off Skomer Island, Pembrokeshire. Her crew were rescued. She was on a voyage from Briton Ferry, Glamorgan to Belfast, County Antrim.

== 9 March ==
List of shipwrecks: 9 March 1887
Ship	State	Description
Bruges	Belgium	The steamship collided with the steamship Kestrel (United Kingdom) and sank in the River Thames at Rotherhithe, Surrey, United Kingdom. Bruges was on a voyage from Ghent, East Flanders to London, United Kingdom.

== 10 March ==
List of shipwrecks: 10 March 1887
Ship	State	Description
Lieutenant Maury	Flag unknown	The ship capiszed at King's Lynn, Norfolk, United Kingdom. She was on a voyagen from King's Lynn to Swansea, Glamorgan, United Kingdom. She was righted.
Samuel MacManemy	United States	The schooner was lost off Apalachicola, Florida.

== 11 March ==
List of shipwrecks: 11 March 1887
Ship	State	Description
Malt	United Kingdom	The barge was run into by the steamship Shagbrook (United Kingdom) and sank in the River Thames at East Greenwich, Middlesex.
Principia	United Kingdom	The steamship caught fire at Boston, Massachusetts, United States. The fire was extinguished.

== 15 March ==
List of shipwrecks: 15 March 1887
Ship	State	Description
Devonshire Lass	United Kingdom	The ship ran aground on the Grand Bank, in the Solent east of Yarmouth, Isle of Wight. She was on a voyage from Sunderland, County Durham to Exeter, Devon. She was refloated and resumed her voyage.
Flavio	Italy	The barque foundered off Cape San Antonio, Spain. Her crew were rescued. She was on a voyage from Barcelona to Cádiz, Spain.

== 16 March ==
List of shipwrecks: 16 March 1887
Ship	State	Description
Sophia	United Kingdom	The brig was run ashore in the River Thames at Erith, Kent.

== 20 March ==
List of shipwrecks: 20 March 1887
Ship	State	Description
Derry Castle	United Kingdom	The barque was wrecked off Enderby Island, New Zealand with the loss of sixteen of the 24 people on board. Eight survivors reached the island. They were rescued from nearby Auckland Island 154 days later. Derry Castle was on a voyage from Geelong, Victoria to Falmouth, Cornwall or Queenstown, County Cork.
Seal	United States	The steamship was lost in the Lynn Canal with the loss of twelve lives. She was on a voyage from Juneau to Dyea, District of Alaska.

== 21 March ==
List of shipwrecks: 21 March 1887
Ship	State	Description
Cornelius Stokem	France	The schooner collided with the steamship Valetta (Flag unknown) and sank in the Mediterranean Sea 14 nautical miles (26 km) east of Europa Point, Gibraltar. Her crew were rescued.

== 22 March ==
List of shipwrecks: 22 March 1887
Ship	State	Description
London	(United Kingdom of Great Britain and Ireland) Jersey	The ketch ran aground on the Cork Sand, in the North Sea off the coast of Essex. She was on a voyage from Montrose, Forfarshire to London. She was refloated and assisted in to Harwich, Essex in a severely leaky condition.
Prophete Elie	France	The brig was driven ashore and wrecked at Oxwich Point, Glamorgan, United Kingdom. Her crew were rescued.

== 23 March ==
List of shipwrecks: 23 March 1887
Ship	State	Description
Carnarvonshire	United Kingdom	The brigantine was abandoned 50 nautical miles (93 km) south-west of The Lizard, Cornwall. Her ten crew were rescued. She was discovered on 25 March 50 nautical miles (93 km) west south west of the Eddystone Lighthouse, Cornwall by Beagle (United Kingdom), which put four of her crew aboard. Carnarvonshire was taken in to Dartmouth, Devon.
Curlew, and Trent	United Kingdom	The steamships collided in the River Thames and were both severely damaged. Curlew was on a voyage from London to Great Yarmouth, Norfolk. She was beached at East Greenwich, Middlesex, being severely leaky. She was refloated and taken in to Deptford, Kent for repairs. Trent was on a voyage from Sevastopol, Russia to London. She was beached at North Woolwich, Middlesex.
Rome	United Kingdom	The steamship ran aground at Port Said, Egypt. She was on a voyage from the United Kingdom to Australia.
Vardohuus	Norway	The whaler was wrecked at Mandal, Norway, with the loss of all but to of her crew, which numbered about 50 people.

== 24 March ==
List of shipwrecks: 24 March 1887
Ship	State	Description
Faror	Netherlands	The brig foundered in the North Sea. Her crew were rescued by a German schooner. She was on a voyage from Alloa, Clackmannanshire, United Kingdom to Antwerp, Belgium.
Marigo	Russia	The brig was wrecked at Poti, Austria-Hungary with the loss of a crew member.
Nuova Verita	Italy	The barque was driven ashore and wrecked at Poti with the loss of all thirteen crew.
Valetta	United Kingdom	The barque collided with the tug Flying Fish (United Kingdom) and sank off the Tuskar Rock with the loss of two of her crew. Valetta was on a voyage from Point de Galle, Ceylon to Garston, Lancashire.
Unnamed	Austria-Hungary	The dredger sank at Poti with the loss of ten of her crew.

== 25 March ==
List of shipwrecks: 25 March 1887
Ship	State	Description
Prins Hendrik	Netherlands	The barque was abandoned in the Atlantic Ocean (31°58′N 42°00′W). Her 24 crew were rescued by the schooner Lodsen (Norway). Prins Hendrik was on a voyage from Norfolk, Virginia, United States to Liverpool, Lancashire, United Kingdom.

== 27 March ==
List of shipwrecks: 27 March 1887
Ship	State	Description
Arda	United Kingdom	The barque collided with the steamship Noordland (Belgium) off the South Foreland, Kent and was damaged. Arda was beached at Sandown Castle, Kent. Her ten crew were rescued by the tug Columbia (United Kingdom). Arda was on a voyage from Wilmington, United States to London.
Dumfriesshire	United Kingdom	The full-rigged ship ran aground at Dunkirk, Nord, France. She was on a voyage from San Francisco, California, United States to Dunkirk.

== 28 March ==
List of shipwrecks: 28 March 1887
Ship	State	Description
Argo	Flag unknown	The yacht was driven ashore at La Maddelena, Sardinia, Italy. She was on a voyage from Algiers, Algeria to Naples, Italy.

== 29 March ==
List of shipwrecks: 29 March 1887
Ship	State	Description
Lovaine	United Kingdom	The steamship was sighted off Newport News, Virginia, United States whilst on a voyage from the Coosaw River to the River Tyne. No further trace, reported missing.

== 31 March ==
List of shipwrecks: 31 March 1887
Ship	State	Description
Crest	United Kingdom	The ketch was abandoned off Thurso, Caithness. Her crew were rescued by the Thurso Lifeboat.
Elizabeth Ann	United Kingdom	The schooner was driven ashore and wrecked at Joppa Point, Lothian. Her crew were rescued.
Flora	United Kingdom	The smack broke from her moorings, collided with the steamship Victory and drove ashore at Kingscross, Isle of Arran.
Harbinger	United Kingdom	The smack collided with the barque Bertha (Norway) and was abandoned by four of her six crew, who got aboard Bertha. Fate of Harbinger unknown.
Hollandia	United Kingdom	The steamship collided with the steamship Ancona (United Kingdom) and sank in the River Thames at Gravesend, Kent. Hollandia was on a voyage from Harlingen, Friesland, Netherlands to London.
Jamestown	United States	The schooner departed from Gloucester, Massachusetts. No furter trace, presumed foundered with the loss of all twelve hands.
Janet Worthington	United Kingdom	The schooner was abandoned off Thurso. Her crew were rescued by the Thurso Lifeboat.
Lady Louisa Pennant	United Kingdom	The schooner was abandoned off Thurso. Her crew were rescued by the Thurso Lifeboat.
Ounimak	United States	The schooner ran aground on a reef off Pavlof Harbor, District of Alaska and capsized with the loss of all six crew.
Toiler	United Kingdom	The steam trawler was abandoned off the coast of Caithness.

== Unknown date ==
List of shipwrecks: Unknown date in March 1887
Ship	State	Description
Abbie Carver	United States	The barque was wrecked on the east coast of Formosa. She was on a voyage from Hong Kong to Callao, Peru.
Antonia	Flag unknown	The ship ran aground on the Gunfleet Sand, in the North Sea off the coast of Essex, United Kingdom. She was refloated, and was towed in to Harwich, Essex by the steamship Swift (United Kingdom).
Cité d'Aleth	France	The barque ran aground on the Valeyrac Rocks. She was on a voyage from Bordeaux, Gironde to Cádiz, Spain. She was refloated and put back to Bordeaux.
City of Cambridge	United Kingdom	The ship was driven ashore at Hooghly Point, India. She was later refloated with the assistance of a steamship and resumed her voyage.
City of Exeter	United Kingdom	The steamship foundered in the Bristol Channel off Lundy Island, Devon, with the loss of sixteen of her nineteen crew.
Clymene	United Kingdom	The steamship was driven ashore in the River Thames at Erith, Kent.
Connaught	United Kingdom	The barge collided with the steamship Thorsten (Flag unknown) and sank in the River Thames.
Emmeline	United Kingdom	The brigantine ran aground in the Rio Grande. She was on a voyage from Pernambuco to Natal, Brazil. She was refloated and put back to Pernambuco in a leaky condition.
Evening Star	United Kingdom	The dandy riged fishing trawler was lost in the English Channel with the loss of all ten crew.
Favorit	Netherlands	The brig was abandoned in the North Sea. Her crew were rescued by the tug Tom Perry (United Kingdom).
Flora Glynn	United Kingdom	The collier sank on the Goodwin Sands, Kent. Her five crew were rescued by a lifeboat.
Floridian	United Kingdom	The steamship ran aground in the South Pass, Mississippi River.
Forcade de la Roquette	France	The ship was wrecked on the coast of India. Her crew were rescued. She was on a voyage from Saint-Pierre, Réunion to False Point, India.
Franceschino	Italy	The barque was abandoned in the Atlantic Ocean.
Giorgio	Greece	The ship was wrecked at "Bouloir Lines", Ottoman Empire and was abandoned by her captain.
Grace Bradley	United States	The schooner was driven ashore at Philadelphia, Pennsylvania. She was refloated and taken in to Philadelphia.
Gitana	Russia	The barque was driven ashore 8 nautical miles (15 km) west of Dunbar, Lothian, United Kingdom. Her eight crew were rescued by rocket apparatus.
Gylfe	Sweden	The steamship ran aground in the Great Belt. She was on a voyage from Reval, Russia to "Veile".
Kamtchatka	Flag unknown	The ship was driven ashore and wrecked at Hiogo, Japan.
Karo	Flag unknown	The steamship was wrecked at Poti, Austria-Hungary.
King Malcolm	United Kingdom	The barque ran aground in the River Liffey. She was on a voyage from San Francisco, California, United States to Dublin.
Lord Tredegar	United Kingdom	The schooner was driven ashore and wrecked at Pernambuco. She was on a voyage from Natal, Brazil to New York, United States.
Louisiana	Italy	The barque was severely damaged by fire at Antwerp, Belgium.
Margaret Leonard	United Kingdom	The schooner ran aground at Killala, County Mayo and was damaged. She was on a voyage from Swansea, Glamorgan to Killala.
Martin Luther	Flag unknown	The ship was driven ashore and sank at Svelvik, Norway.
Mary K. Campbell	United States	The ship was driven ashore. She was on a voyage from New York to Buenos Aires, Argentina. She was refloated and put back to New York.
Minerva	Germany	The barque ran aground on the Middelgrund, in the Baltic Sea.
Reindeer	United Kingdom	The ship was wrecked on the Gunfleet Sand. Her nine crew survived.
Samuel Moss	United Kingdom	The ship ran aground in Plymouth Sound. She was later refloated.
Savina	Italy	The barque was abandoned at sea before 25 March.
Syanara	United States	The ship was driven ashore in the Bahamas. She was on a voyage from Matanzas, Cuba to New York. She was refloated and taken in to Nassau, Bahamas in a leaky condition.
Triton	United Kingdom	The schooner was run into by the steamship Rhine (Flag unknown) and sank in the English Channel off Brighton, Sussex. Her crew were rescued by Rhine.
Umberto Arbib	United Kingdom	The steamship ran agrouned in the Gironde near Bordeaux. She was refloated and taken in to Bordeaux.
Unico	Flag unknown	The ship was wrecked at "Bahama Willows", Bahamas. She was on a voyage from Pensacola, Florida, United States to Newport, Monmouthshire, United Kingdom.
Valetta	Flag unknown	The barque was wrecked off the "Tulsar" with the loss of two lives.
Vendome	United Kingdom	The full-rigged ship capsized in the North Sea. She was subsequently towed in to Vlissingen, Zeeland, Netherlands and beached.
Verita Nuova, and an unnamed vessel	Flags unknown	The ship was run into by a dredger at Poti, Austria-Hungary and sank with the loss of thirteen lives. The dredger sank with the loss of ten lives
