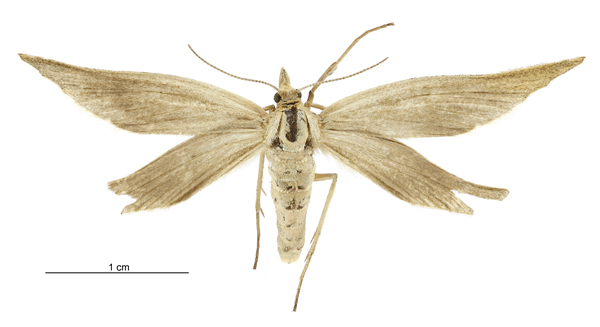
- Female
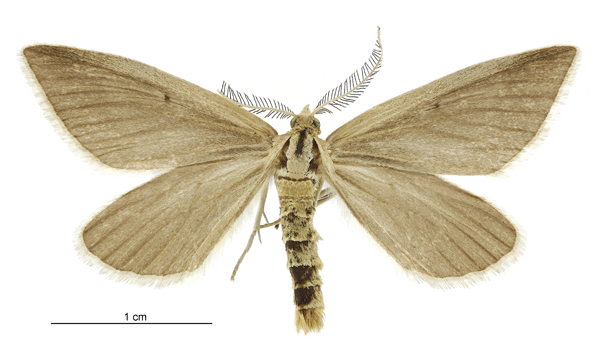
- Male

Scientific classification
- Kingdom: Animalia
- Phylum: Arthropoda
- Clade: Pancrustacea
- Class: Insecta
- Order: Lepidoptera
- Family: Geometridae
- Genus: Asaphodes
- Species: A. oxyptera

Binomial name
- Asaphodes oxyptera (Hudson, 1909))

Synonyms
- Xanthorhoe oxyptera Hudson, 1909

= Asaphodes oxyptera =

Species of moth endemic to New Zealand

Asaphodes oxyptera is a species of moth in the family Geometridae. This species is endemic to New Zealand and is only found in the Auckland Islands.

== Taxonomy ==
This species was first described by George Hudson in 1909 using a specimen collected by A. A. Dorrien-Smith at North Arm, Carnley Harbour, Auckland Island and named Xanthorhoe oxyptera. Hudson went on to discuss and illustrate this species in his book The butterflies and moths of New Zealand. In 1964 Dugdale illustrated the male genitalia of this species. In 1971 J. S. Dugdale placed this species in the genus Asaphodes. In 1988 Dugdale confirmed this placement in his catalogue of New Zealand Lepidoptera. The male holotype specimen is held at Te Papa.

== Description ==
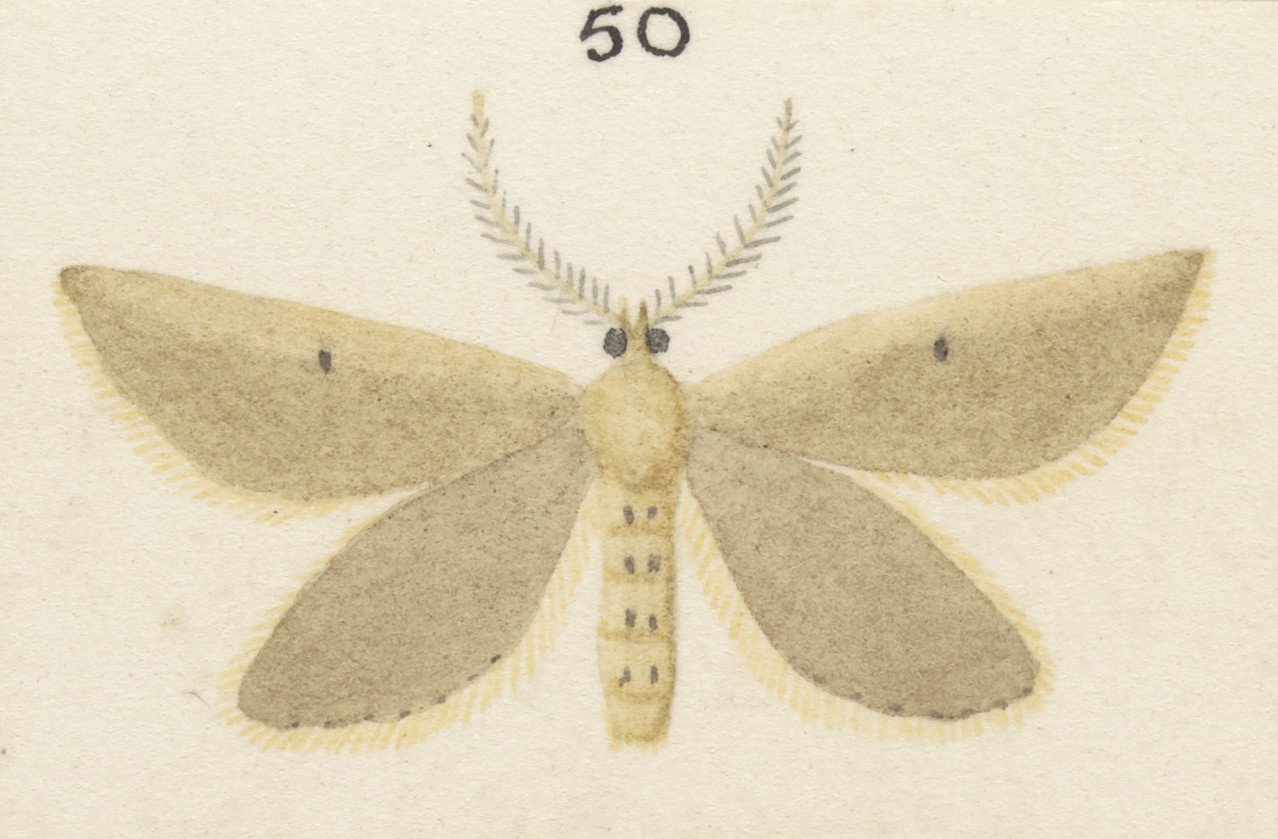
Illustration of A. oxyptera by George Hudson.

Hudson described this species as follows:

The expansion of the wings is 1 3/8 in. The head, thorax, and abdomen are brownish-ochreous, the last-named with two blackish spots on the back of each segment. The palpi are slender, nearly as long as the head, whitish-ochreous. The antennae are whitish-ochreous, with long black pectinations extending to the apex. The forewings are elongate, narrow, with the apex extremely acute and the tornus rounded, rather dark greyish-brown, very glossy, with the bases of the veins and a broad costal band pale brownish-ochreous; a small black discal dot. Hindwings narrow, apex and tornus rounded, greyish-brown, very glossy, without markings except a few extremely minute blackish marginal dots. On the underside all the wings are whitish-ochreous, the costa of the forewing and the whole of the hindwing darker; the basal portions of all the veins are strongly marked in blackish-brown. The cilia of all the wings are very pale-ochreous.

== Distribution ==
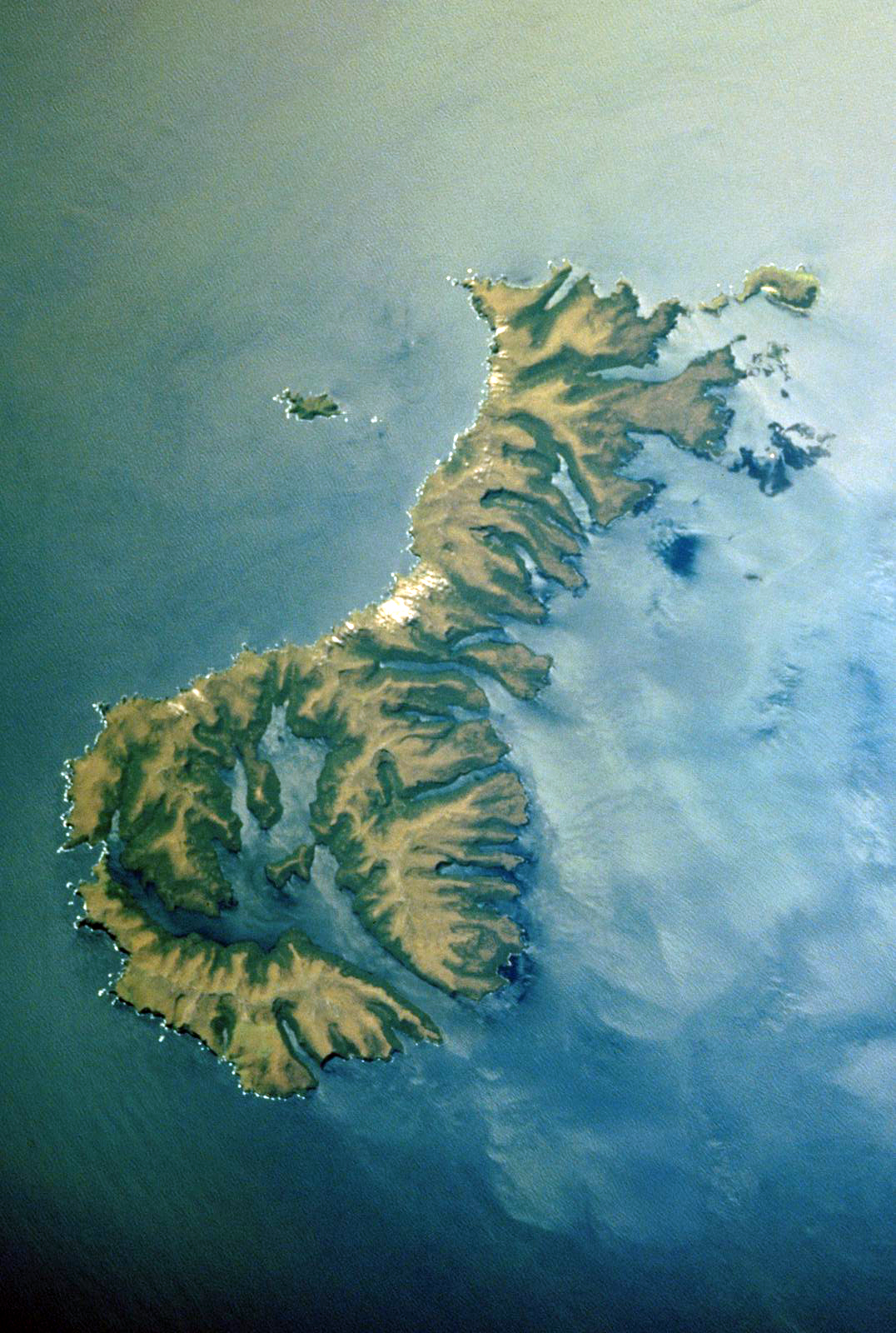
Auckland Islands

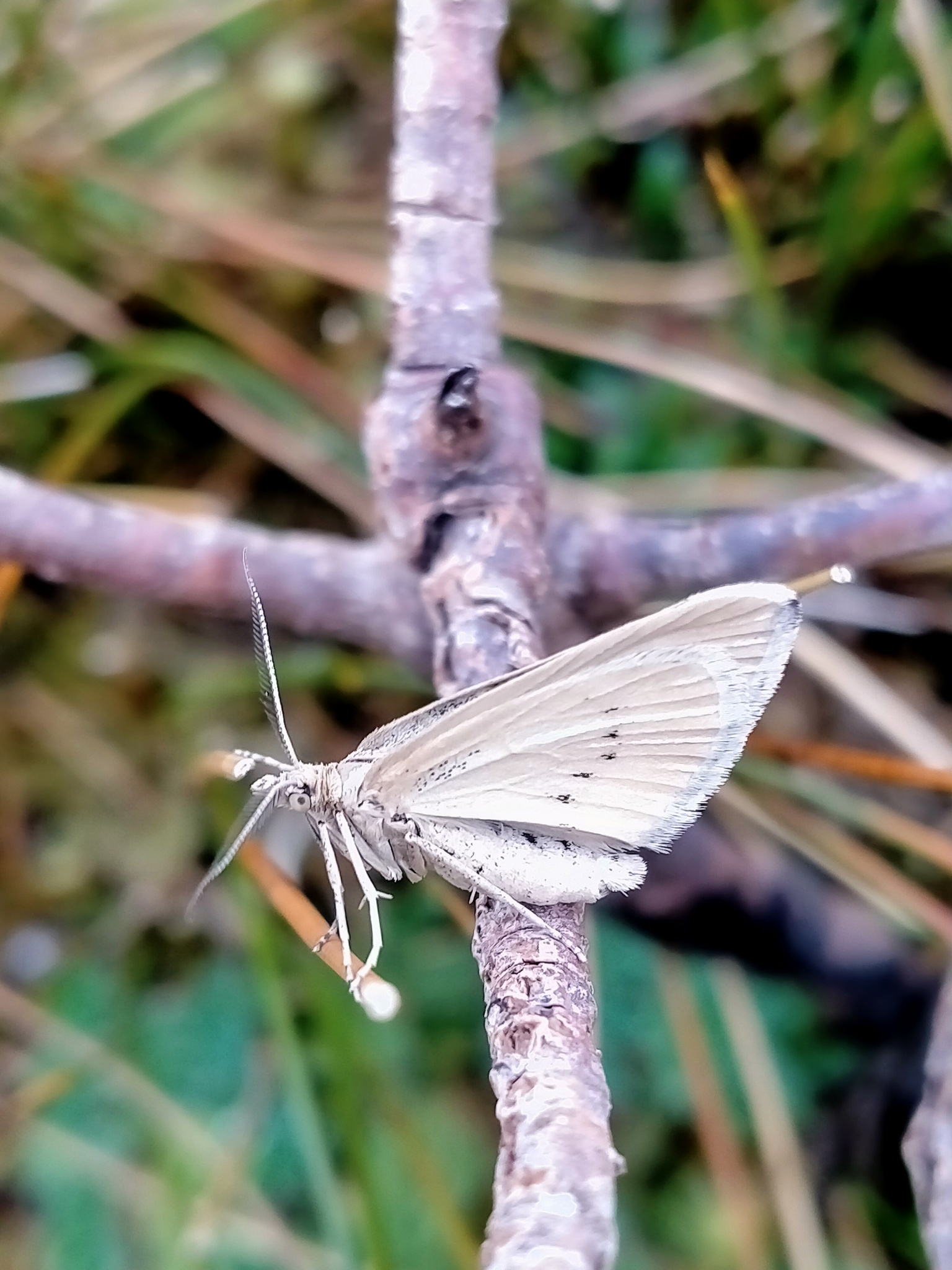
Adult male observed on Auckland Island

This species is endemic to the Auckland Islands of New Zealand and has been found on Adams Island and Auckland Island.
