= List of inlets of the Auckland Islands =

Harbours and inlets of the Auckland Islands

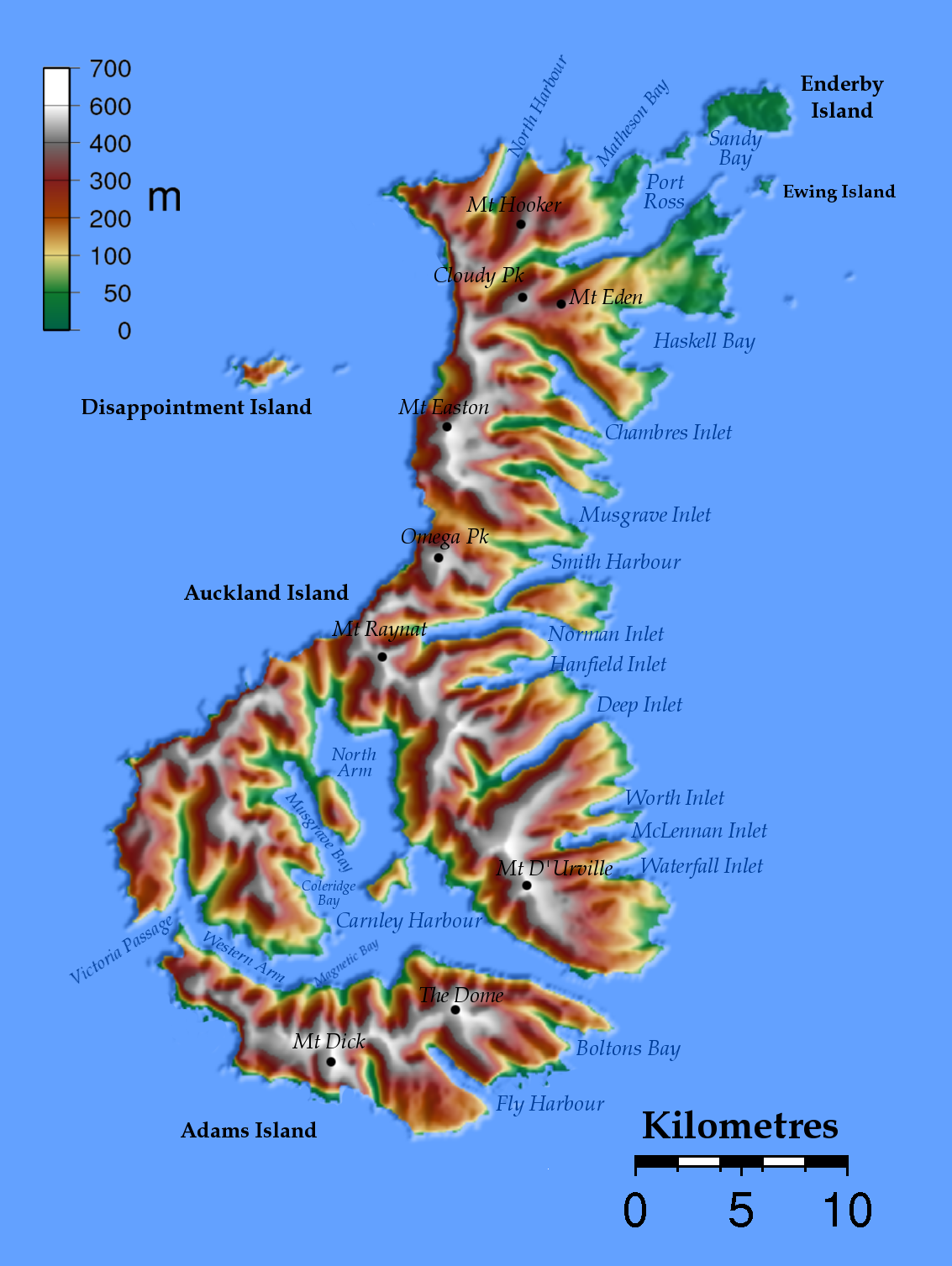

The Auckland Islands, in New Zealand's subantarctic islands, are a volcanic archipelago. The main island, Auckland Island, is heavily indented with a series of inlets, especially on its east coast. The most prominent inlet is Carnley Harbour, which separates the main island from Adams Island to the south.

The following is a list of inlets, deep narrow bays, and other natural harbours in the Auckland Islands. The inlets are listed in geographical order, clockwise from the northwestern tip of Auckland Island, North West Cape.

North coast, Auckland Island

- North Harbour
- Matheson Bay
- Laurie Harbour
- Port Ross

East coast, Auckland Island

- Haskell Bay
- Chambres Inlet
- Musgrave Inlet
- Smith Harbour
- Norman Inlet
- Hanfield Inlet
- Deep Inlet
- Worth Inlet
- McLennan Inlet
- Waterfall Inlet

South coast, Auckland Island

- Carnley Harbour (Adams Straits)
  - Tagua Bay
  - North Arm
  - Musgrave Harbour
  - Coleridge Bay
  - Western Arm

Adams Island (clockwise from northwesternmost point)

- Magnetic Bay
- Bolton's Bay
- Fly Harbour
