= Castaway depot =

Hut or store used to aid persons lost at sea

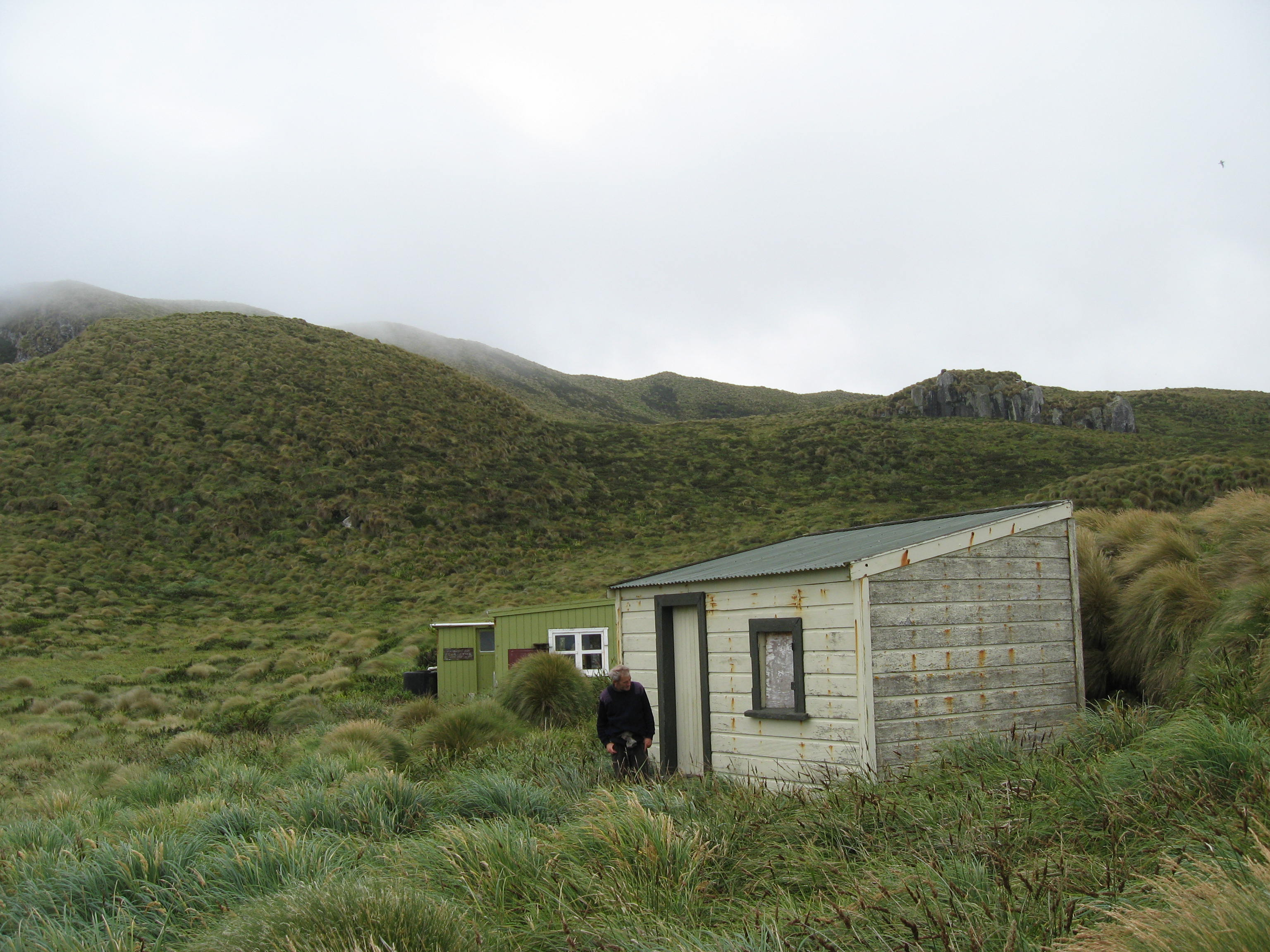
Castaway depot on Antipodes Island

A castaway depot is a store or hut placed on an isolated island to provide emergency supplies and relief for castaways and victims of shipwrecks.

A string of depots were built by the New Zealand government on their subantarctic islands in the late-19th and early-20th centuries that were kept supplied and patrolled until modern technologies and alteration in trade routes rendered them unnecessary.

== Shipping in the subantarctic ==
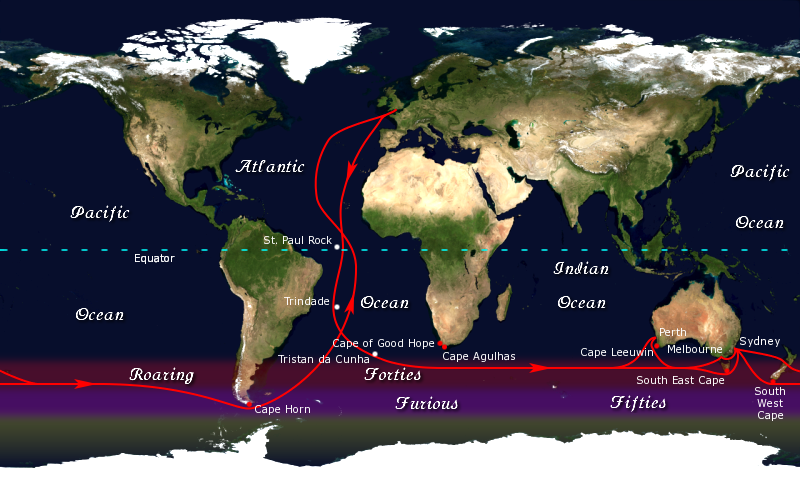
Clipper Route followed by ships sailing between Britain and Australia–New Zealand

The standard trade clipper route from Australia and New Zealand to Europe took a line-of-latitude route in the Southern Ocean. Ships dropped below the Roaring Forties to make use of the prevailing westerlies that carried them around Cape Horn. These winds could be strong and the waters treacherous; moreover, the smattering of islands was often poorly charted. For example, in 1868, Henry Armstrong of the Amherst notified the New Zealand government that the commonly used chart prepared by James Imray in 1851 placed the Auckland Islands 35 miles (56 km) south of their true position.

Regardless of the charts' accuracy, the cloudy weather predominant in the area made navigation by sextant difficult. The uninhabited Auckland Islands lay directly within the standard route. In the event of a shipwreck on any of these islands, due to their subantarctic climate they offered little natural sustenance or provisions to castaways. Thomas Musgrave, captain of the Grafton that was wrecked on the Auckland Islands in 1864, described the "incessant gales, constant hail, snow and pelting rain" that plagued the survivors.

The Grafton, a schooner out of Sydney in search of tin deposits, ran aground in Carnley Harbour during a storm in January 1864; the five survivors lived in huts made from salvaged materials for 19 months before three members of the crew made the journey successfully to Stewart Island in five days in the repaired ship's boat; Captain Musgrave then arranged a rescue of the remaining two castaways. The same year, the three-masted clipper Invercauld, en route to Chile, was wrecked on the northwestern end of the island. Of the 25 crew members, 19 made it ashore, but only three survived the winter. The others succumbed to exposure; they were unaware of the presence of the Grafton crew castaways to the south.

In 1866, the General Grant was wrecked on the western coast of Auckland Islands. Fifteen of the 83 on board survived the wreck, but only ten endured on the island until rescued by the Amherst 18 months later. These experiences prompted a concerted programme to manage the risk of castaways in the area, and depots were established.

== Establishment of patrols and depots ==
Following the discovery of the General Grant shipwreck survivors on Auckland Island in 1867, New Zealand's Southland provincial government, and some Australian states, established a number of emergency depots on Auckland, Campbell, Antipodes and Bounty Islands. The initial expedition to create the depots was led by Henry Armstrong of the Amherst in 1868. The first wooden depot was built and provisioned at Sandy Bay, Enderby Island. In 1877, the central New Zealand government took over responsibility for managing the network of supply huts and cabins on their territorial islands to provide sustenance and emergency supplies.

From 1877 to 1927, government steamers such as NZGSS Hinemoa, patrolled the depots to check for survivors and maintain the facilities. The steamers visited each island every six months, doing maintenance and repairs of the facilities, cutting firewood for the huts, and dropping off stocks of live animals. The steamers also transported (and supplied) a number of scientific expeditions that enabled collections and observations on the islands to be made.

After about 1927, patrols and depot maintenance were discontinued due to improved radio technology and the falling out of use of the 40°S route for trade.

== Depots and island provisions ==
The curse of the widow and fatherless light upon the man that breaks open this box, whilst he has a ship at his back.

— Government warning on castaway depot

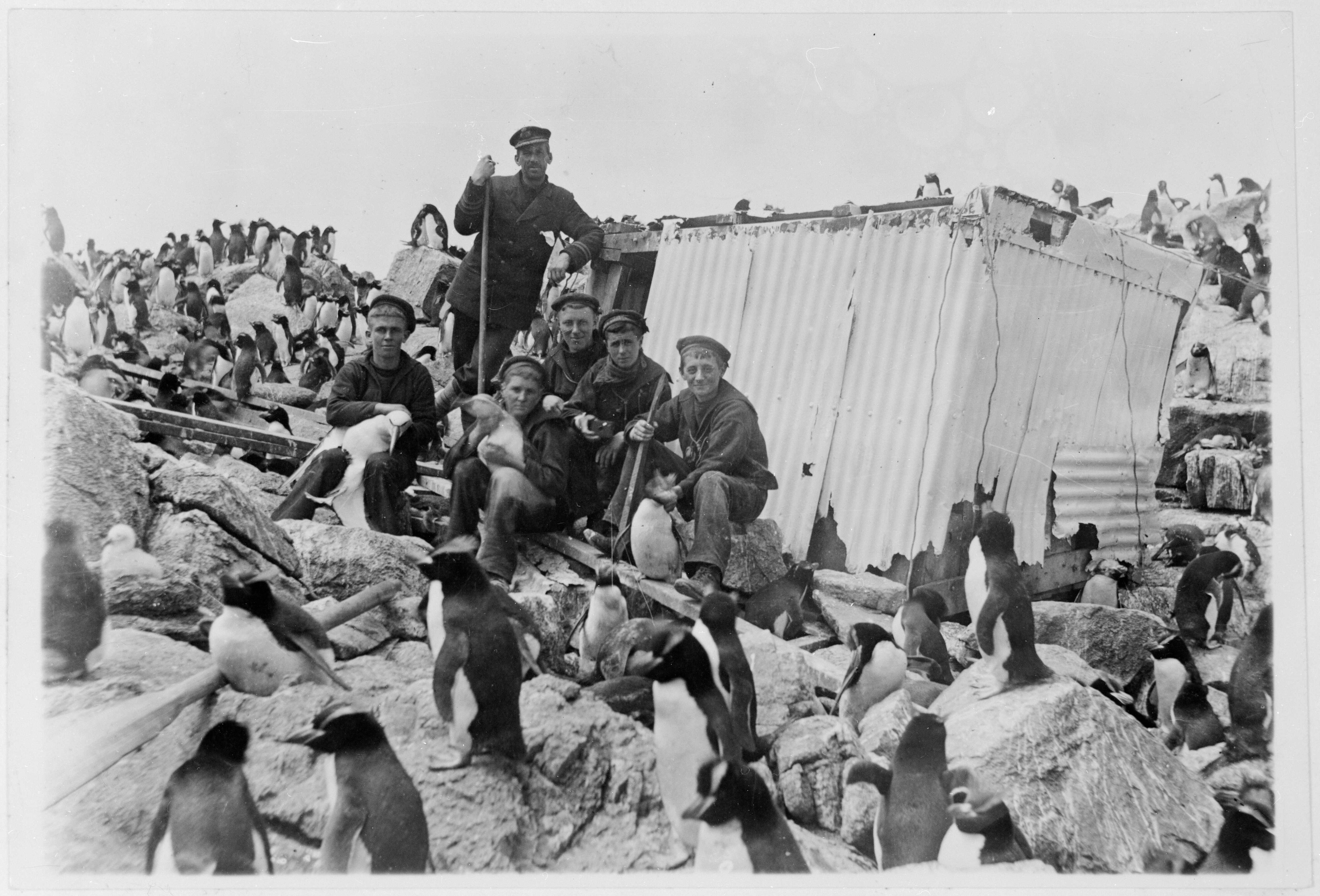
Captain Hooper of the New Zealand Government training ship Amokura with maritime cadets, penguins, and the castaway depot on the Bounty Islands, around 1910. Between 1907 and 1918 the cadets made annual excursions to the island groups to provide them with rough-weather experience. The depot was removed in 1927.

Government work crews built the supply depots out of various materials and to various sizes and designs. They were equipped with a range of emergency rations (tinned meat and biscuits), clothing, blankets, fishing equipment, medicine, matches and tools, and weapons and ammunition (to hunt food). Clothing was specially made out of durable, warm fabrics, and stored in metal drums. "Finger posts" (signposts) were set up on the island to direct castaways to the huts.

Various animals were released onto the islands to breed and provide food for castaways. Pigs were released on the Auckland Islands from the early 19th century, followed later by goats on Auckland, Enderby, Ewing, and Ocean Island in the Auckland Group as well as on The Snares, the Antipodes and Campbell groups. Sheep were also widespread, and rabbits were released at Enderby and Auckland Island in 1840, and Rose Island in 1850. Cattle were temporarily farmed on Enderby Island, but had been released there earlier as castaway stock. Many of these animals died, but some survived into the 20th century.

These small populations remained isolated from other breeds, and consequently many, such as the Auckland Island pig, Enderby Island cattle and the Enderby Island rabbit, retain rare characteristics. The Department of Conservation has transported some of these previously introduced animal populations off the islands and onto the New Zealand mainland, where they are monitored by the Rare Breeds Conservation Society of New Zealand, in an effort to return the subantarctic islands to their natural state. The goats, however, became extinct before these efforts began.

Some islands were provided with boatsheds to enable survivors to reach other land or close castaway depots, such as the depot on Enderby Island that was replaced by a boat shed for survivors to reach the nearby Auckland Island. The survivors of the Derry Castle, in 1887, built a punt to carry them from Enderby Island to Auckland Island. Following their rescue, a government steamer moved the punt to a new boatshed on Rose Island (that lies south west of Enderby Island), for the use of any marooned there. After the collapse of the historic Rose Island boatshed in 1973, the punt was transferred to Enderby Island. It is now on display at the Southland Museum.

Some depots were targeted by thieves, whalers and other seamen who saw the depots as a source of free food and provisions. To discourage raiding, clothing left at the depots was often distinctively marked, so it could be identified, and warnings were painted on the huts.

== Depot locations ==
On the Auckland Islands, depots were established on the main island at the inner reaches of Norman Inlet, and at Erebus Cove, Port Ross (where there was also a boatshed). The boatshed and ruined depot are the only historical buildings left at Erebus Cove.

Also present in Erebus Cove is a southern rātā tree (known as the Victoria Tree) with a carved inscription commemorating the routine castaway survey visit of the Australian government ship Victoria in 1865. Camp Cove, on Carnley Harbour, had a depot, shelter and boatshed. On Enderby Island, the Stella Hut was located inland from the later boat shed at Sandy Bay. Rose Island and Ewing Island had boatsheds. Signposts were located throughout the islands.

On the Campbell Islands, depots were located at Hut Cove, Anchorage Bay. A depot was established on the rocky Bounty Islands. In 1891, while on a cruise in search of the missing ships Kakanui and Assaye, Captain Fairchild of the Hinemoa noted that the Bounty Island depot had been destroyed by waves, even though located 100 ft above sea level. Attempts were made to land wood for rebuilding, but bad weather prevented the completion of the task.

A number of these depots are still in situ and are managed by the Department of Conservation (DOC); these include the 1908 hut on Antipodes Island, the 1880 Stella Hut on Enderby Island, and the boatshed on Enderby. The 1890s castaway depot at Camp Cove, Carnley Harbour, on Auckland Island was identified in a 2003 DOC survey as "worthy of inclusion on the 'actively managed' list." DOC also maintain other historical sites on the islands, including shipwreck relics.

== Notable shipwrecks ==
There were a total of nine shipwrecks leaving marooned castaways in the New Zealand subantarctic between 1833 and 1908. Some survivors' lives were saved by the existence of the castaway depots. The Auckland Islands alone had eight known shipwrecks – including those with no survivors – between 1864 and 1907, at the cost of 121 lives; a number of these are buried at the historic Enderby cemetery.

=== Derry Castle ===
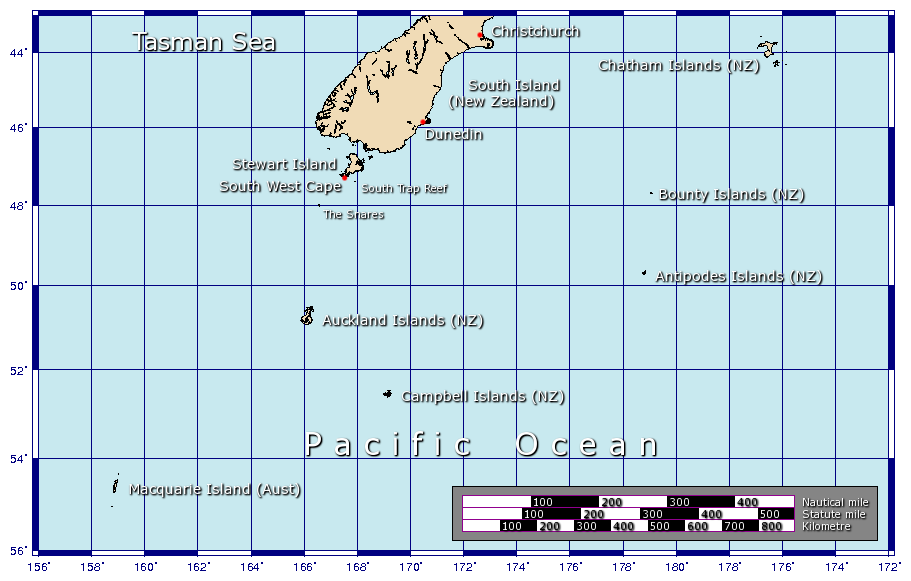
New Zealand's Subantarctic Islands

The first castaways to make use of one of these depots were members of the crew of the Derry Castle, an iron barque that was wrecked on Enderby Island on 20 March 1887. Eight of the 23 crew made it ashore. A depot was in place at Sandy Bay, but looters had removed all supplies but a bottle of salt, so the castaways subsisted on shellfish and a small quantity of wheat recovered from the wreck. After 92 days they discovered an axe head in the sand and were able to use it to build a boat from the wreckage.

Two of the men navigated the boat to nearby Erebus Cove, Port Ross, on Auckland Island, where they obtained supplies from the government depot that had been established there. They then returned to collect the remaining men, and the group lived at Port Ross until they were rescued by the sealer Awarua on 19 July, that took them to Melbourne.

=== Compadre ===
Four years later, on 19 March 1891, the barque Compadre was overwhelmed by fire on board. With seas too rough to launch boats, the barque was driven onto the rocks off the North Cape of Auckland Island. All of the 17 crew members made it ashore, although one of them later died.

They obtained relief and sustenance from two nearby depots, supplemented by livestock that had been released onto the island, and survived in comparatively good health until rescued 122 days later by the sealing schooner Janet Ramsay on 30 June, and carried to Bluff.

=== Spirit of the Dawn ===
In 1893, Spirit of the Dawn foundered on a reef off the Antipodes Islands. The 11 survivors attempted to find the castaway depot, failing due to exhaustion and the mountainous geography. Instead, they subsisted on raw muttonbirds, mussels, and roots. After 87 days, they sighted Hinemoa, attracting its attention by waving a flag made from their sail.

=== Anjou ===
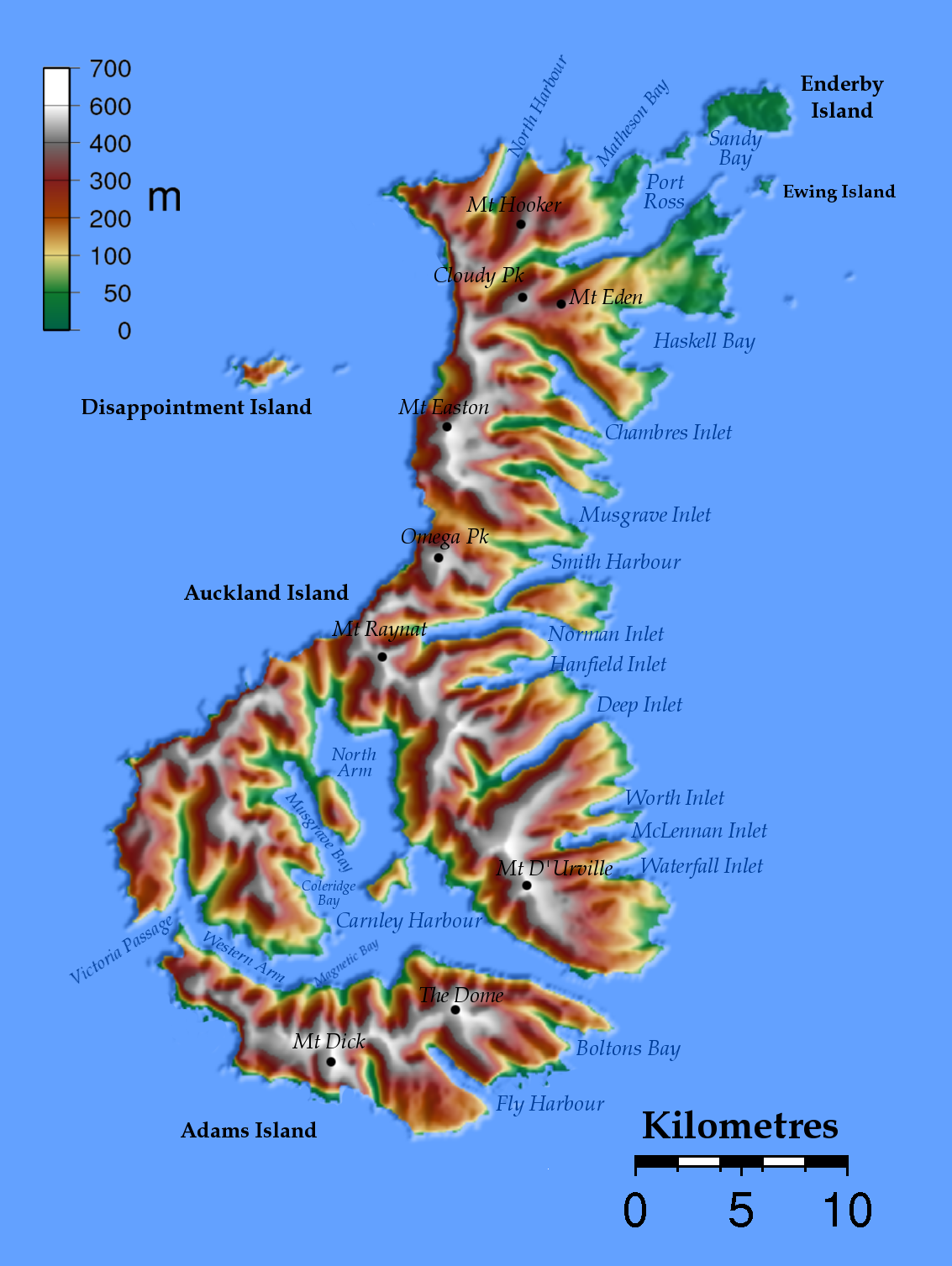
The Auckland Islands

The steel barque Anjou ran ashore on Auckland Island on 5 February 1905. The 22 crew members made it ashore in Carnley Harbour on three of the ship's boats after rowing against strong currents. Ten days later they reached the depot at Camp Cove, that provided them with ample supplies as well as the shipping schedule of the Hinemoa so they knew how long they would have to wait for rescue.

Captain Le Tellac commended the provisions that the government had left for the castaways, without which they would not have survived. Some of the supplies that should have been there were missing; these were later recovered from the house of a Mr. Fleming, a lessee of the island.

Reaching Norman Inlet on 7 May, Captain John Bollons of the Hinemoa noticed signs that there were castaways, located them, and was able to pick them up from the island and carry them to Dunedin. Sailors from the Compadre and the Anjou engraved their names on the walls of the Camp Cove depot.

=== Dundonald ===
On 6 March 1907, the steel barque Dundonald was wrecked on Disappointment Island in the Auckland Islands. The island lacked a depot, and the 17 castaways from a crew of 28 subsisted on what water and food they could find, mainly mollymawks and seals, and dug crude sand shelters. Using wood scavenged on the island and canvas from the ship's sails, they crafted a crude coracle to bear four men across the seven-mile strait to Auckland Island in search of depots.

After several attempts and the loss of two boats, they made a successful crossing to the island in October and journeyed across it to the depot. They found a boat at the depot along with the supplies, so after making sails from their clothing, the four men sailed back to Disappointment Island to retrieve their shipmates and return to the depot. With a gun and ammunition, the castaways were able to supplement their diet with wild cattle hunted on Rose and Enderby Islands.

They were picked up by the Hinemoa on 16 November, and once Captain Bollons had completed his steamship's survey of the Campbell and Antipodes Islands, were taken to Bluff.

=== President Félix Faure ===
The last crew of castaways to obtain relief from the depots were the 22 crew members from the French barque President Félix Faure that was wrecked off the North Cape of Antipodes Island on 13 March 1908. Their lifeboat was broken up by the waves and all their stores were lost, but the entire crew made it ashore not far from one of the depots.

After they had used up the depot's supplies, they hunted albatrosses, penguins and a calf – the sole remnant of the cattle that had been set ashore earlier by the Hinemoa. They were rescued by the warship HMS Pegasus, which was alerted by the smoke from their fires. They reached Lyttelton on 15 May, and then went on to Sydney, from where they obtained passage back to France.

== In film ==
In The Sea Chase, a 1955 film, a German merchant ship flees from British Australian naval ships at the beginning of World War II. The ship stops at Auckland Island (though the film was shot in Hawaii) to take victuals from the rescue station. A pro-Nazi officer finds three castaway fishermen there, whom he shoots. Later, a pursuing ship finds the corpses and chases the German ship.
