= Cape Expedition =

Wartime coastwatching stations on New Zealand's subantarctic islands

- Part of World War II
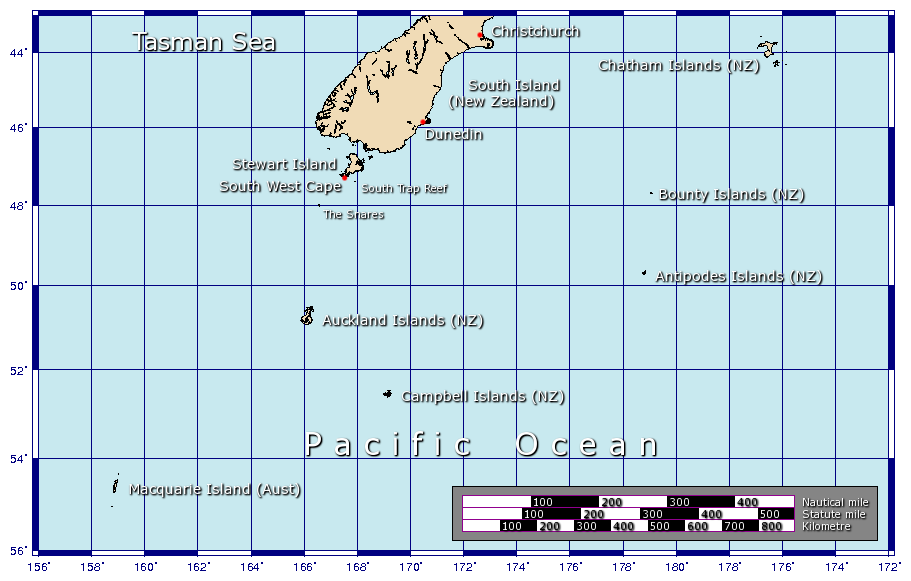
- Map of New Zealand's subantarctic outlying islands
- Location: New Zealand's subantarctic outlying islands
- Objective: Coastwatching and scientific work
- Date: 1941–1945
- Executed by: Public Works Department
- Outcome: No enemy ships sighted, valuable meteorological and other scientific data collected

The Cape Expedition was the deliberately misleading name given to a secret five-year wartime programme of establishing coastwatching stations on New Zealand's more distant uninhabited subantarctic islands. The decision to do so was made by the New Zealand Government's War Cabinet in December 1940, with the program terminating at the end of the Pacific War in 1945.

== History ==
It was suspected that the 6,000-ton German merchant vessel Erlangen, which had sailed from Dunedin, supposedly for Australia, on 26 August 1939 – shortly before war had been declared in Europe – had, instead, supplemented her meagre coal reserves with timber from the Auckland Islands and headed for South America. The suspicion was later confirmed when the first coastwatchers in the program found areas of newly cut southern rātā forest at Carnley Harbour on Auckland Island. Moreover, the loss of the ships SS Holmwood and MS Rangitane to German raiders in November 1940 gave rise to the suspicion that the raiders were using the subantarctic islands as bases.

The Cape Expedition program was managed by the Public Works Department's Aerodrome Services Branch. The auxiliary schooner Tagua, carrying the first contingent of coastwatchers, sailed from Wellington on 5 March 1941. The ship reached the Aucklands on 10 March and sheltered in the natural harbour of Port Ross before proceeding to Carnley Harbour, arriving there on the 13th.

=== Stations ===
Three stations were established, at Ranui Cove in Port Ross at the northern end, and at Carnley Harbour at the southern end, of Auckland Island, and at Perseverance Harbour, Campbell Island. The stations were small, with four men (increased to five in the second year) at each. At first the coastwatchers were civilians, but all were attested as privates in the New Zealand Army from December 1942.

The stations consisted of portable prefabricated huts with double plywood walls and double windows. Each station also had a dinghy with an outboard motor. Because it was understood that resupplying them could be problematic and sporadic, the stations were provided with three years' supply of food, clothing and other consumables. A larger vessel, the 57-ton MV Ranui with a crew of four, was based at Waterfall Inlet in the Aucklands to serve as a link between the stations and, in an emergency, the outside world.

=== Coastwatching ===
Early instructions to the coastwatchers emphasised concealment, with emergency radios set up in the scrub near each station. As well as their primary task of keeping their eyes on the sea for ships, the men (no women were involved) carried out surveys, took weather measurements, and made observations and collections of the wildlife of the islands. Each station made radio contact daily with New Zealand, at staggered times to minimise the risk of their presence becoming known. The men were relieved yearly, though a few repeated their tours of duty; two of them spent three years on the islands, with the naturalist J.H. Sorensen spending four years on Campbell Island.

A popular recreational activity, which also supplied fresh meat to supplement the preserved food rations, was hunting the introduced species of wildlife on the islands. On Auckland Island there were wild pigs and, on Enderby Island, wild cattle and blue rabbits. On Campbell Island the feral sheep provided high quality lamb and mutton.

=== Results ===
Although no enemy ships were sighted during the duration of the program, the secondary work carried out by the coastwatchers proved successful. From June 1942 the stations began reporting weather conditions daily; the reports were so valuable that in the third year of the program trained meteorologists joined the relief parties. Surveyors, geologists and naturalists also became part of the program, during the fourth and fifth years of which a special party of three completed the survey of the island groups. When the coastwatchers were demobilised on 15 October 1945 and withdrawn, the Campbell Island station was retained as part of New Zealand's weather forecasting service. Many of the scientific results garnered through the work of the Cape Expedition's coastwatchers were later published by the New Zealand Department of Scientific and Industrial Research in its Cape Expedition Series of bulletins. Ornithologist and museum director Robert Falla had been involved in organising the expedition.
