= Rose Island (New Zealand) =

Island of the Auckland group in the subantarctic South Pacific

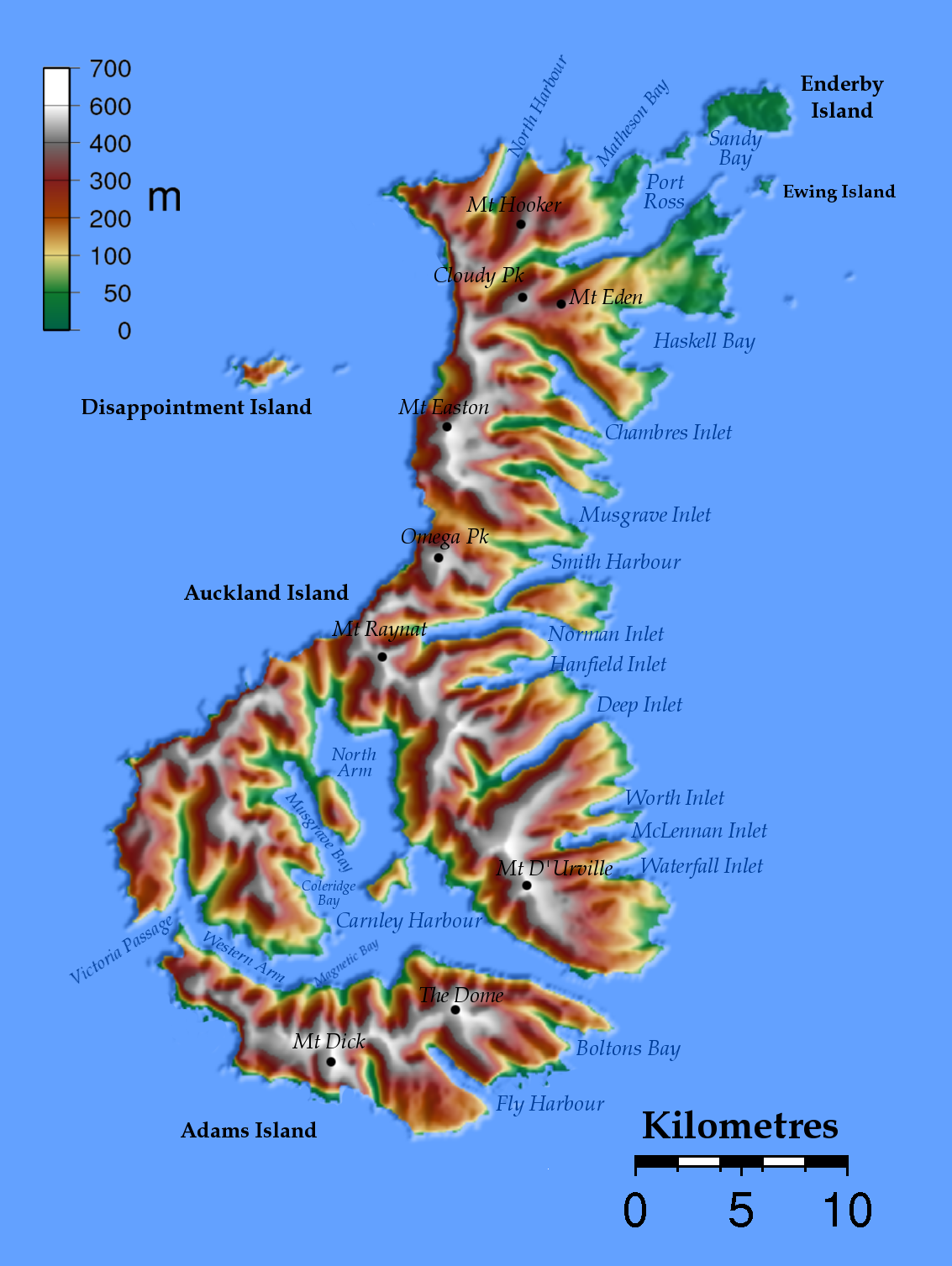
- The Auckland group
- Interactive map of Rose Island

Geography
- Coordinates: 50.514°S 166.249°E
- Archipelago: Auckland Islands
- Area: 1.21 km^{2} (0.47 sq mi)
- Length: 1.6 km (0.99 mi)
- Width: 0.8 km (0.5 mi)

Administration
- New Zealand

Demographics
- Population: 0
- Pop. density: 0/km^{2} (0/sq mi)

Rose Island is an uninhabited island and, with an area of 121 hectares, the fifth largest of the Auckland Islands group, a subantarctic chain that forms part of the New Zealand Outlying Islands.

It is located in the northeast of the group, in the mouth of Port Ross, Auckland Island and south west of the larger Enderby Island. It was stocked with rabbits and provided with a boatshed for the relief of castaways during the nineteenth century. The rabbits have since been eradicated by the Department of Conservation, and provides a secure home for a population of Auckland Islands teal. The vegetation on Rose Island contains southern rātā, and while much original vegetation has been destroyed, it is less modified than much of the Auckland Islands.

== See also ==
- Composite Antarctic Gazetteer
- SCAR
- Territorial claims in Antarctica
- New Zealand Subantarctic Islands
- List of Antarctic and subantarctic islands#List of subantarctic islands
- List of islands of New Zealand
- List of islands
- Desert island
