= Compadre (ship) =

Compadre was an iron barque of 800 tons that was wrecked in the Auckland Islands in 1891.

== Last voyage ==
=== Crew ===
The list of the crew was reported as:

- David Jones, captain
- Francis Bath, mate
- F. Cox, second mate
- E. A. Roberts, apprentice
- J. R. Clarkson, apprentice
- H. Roberts, steward
- E. Steward
- H. English, carpenter
- F. Woods, able seaman
- J. Harding, able seaman
- Dugald Black, able seaman
- F. F. Wright, able seaman
- F. Englem, able seaman
- A. Blebler, able seaman
- John Nummock, able seaman
- H. Brownett, able seaman
- Peter Nelson, able seaman

=== Wreck ===
The Compadre sailed from Calcutta for Chile on 22 January 1891, with a cargo of jute bags. On 16 March, it was discovered that the cargo had caught fire. The crew poured water into the hold from 10 a.m. to 6 p.m. but the fire could not be extinguished.

The captain decided to make for Bluff, New Zealand as this was the nearest port but when the weather worsened on 18 March, the situation became even more precarious. The heavy weather hindered the men manning the pumps as they were constantly being swept away from them by the sea. The pumps were being worked to extract the water that was constantly being poured into the hold to control the fire. Without constant pumping the hold began to fill with water and the ship began to sink.

Land was sighted on the morning of 19 March, and the ship was deliberately aimed at the shore. The ship struck the rocks hard. The boats could not be launched because of the foul weather so the crew had climbed onto the jib boom and when the vessel struck the crew jumped for the rocks. Some received injuries but all 17 crew made it to shore. The ship broke up within 10 minutes.

After climbing the cliff to get up onto the island the crew saw a flagpole and headed towards it. Part way through the journey the last man in the party, Peter Nelson, told the man in front that he was going to lie down and sleep. They agreed that Nelson would light a fire so they could locate him the next day. But no fire was sighted and Peter Nelson did not rejoin the group.

The crew stopped to overnight at a beach and to gather seafood for a meal. The next day after a fruitless search for Peter Nelson the crew found the castaway depot at Erebus Cove. In the depot was a note informing them that the Hinemoa had called the month before. The Hinemoa made regular visits to refresh the depots and to look for shipwreck survivors. This last visit was an attempt to find any survivors of the Kakanui.

The crew split into two with one party remaining with Captain Jones in Erebus Cove and the other party leaving with the mate Bales for Carnley Harbour. The Carnley Harbour group had a hard journey but found the other depot intact. Both parties survived for three and half months until they were both rescued by the arrival of the sealing ship Janet Ramsay on 30 June.

== Rescue and inquiry ==
The Janet-Ramsey arrived at Bluff with the castaways on 6 July 1891. The official inquiry was held at the Courthouse in Invercargill on 9 July before C.E. Rawson, R.M. and Captain N. McDonald, Bluff Harbour master. The sequence of events was confirmed by the testimony of both Captain Jones and Bales but there was a dispute over the cause of the fire.

Both the captain and the mate stated that they thought it likely the fire was caused by the friction of the cargo moving against the ship. The captain stated that jute goods were considered a risky cargo as oil was used in their manufacture and made them liable for combustion. Friction on bales of goods had been discovered during the voyage and canvas had been worked in between the bales and the hold to restrict this and to prevent further damage to the bales.

However, Seaman Woods testified that he saw the captain and Seaman Black go down to the hold with a naked candle on the morning of March 16. Soon after the captain raised the alarm of fire and Woods saw that Black was holding a candlestick but with no candle. Woods asked where the candle was and asserted the captain said to say nothing but that he (the captain) had dropped it between the bales.

The other depositions including Black's did not support Woods and inquiry found Woods to be an unreliable witness. The inquiry found that the loss of the ship was caused primarily by the necessity of altering course in order to reach a port once fire was discovered and that the Compadre was run ashore to save the lives of her crew. The court was of the opinion that the master and officers of the ship did all that was possible to save the vessel and they were not to blame for her loss.
