= Port Ross =

Natural harbour on Auckland Island, New Zealand

Coordinates: 50°32′42″S 166°13′38″E

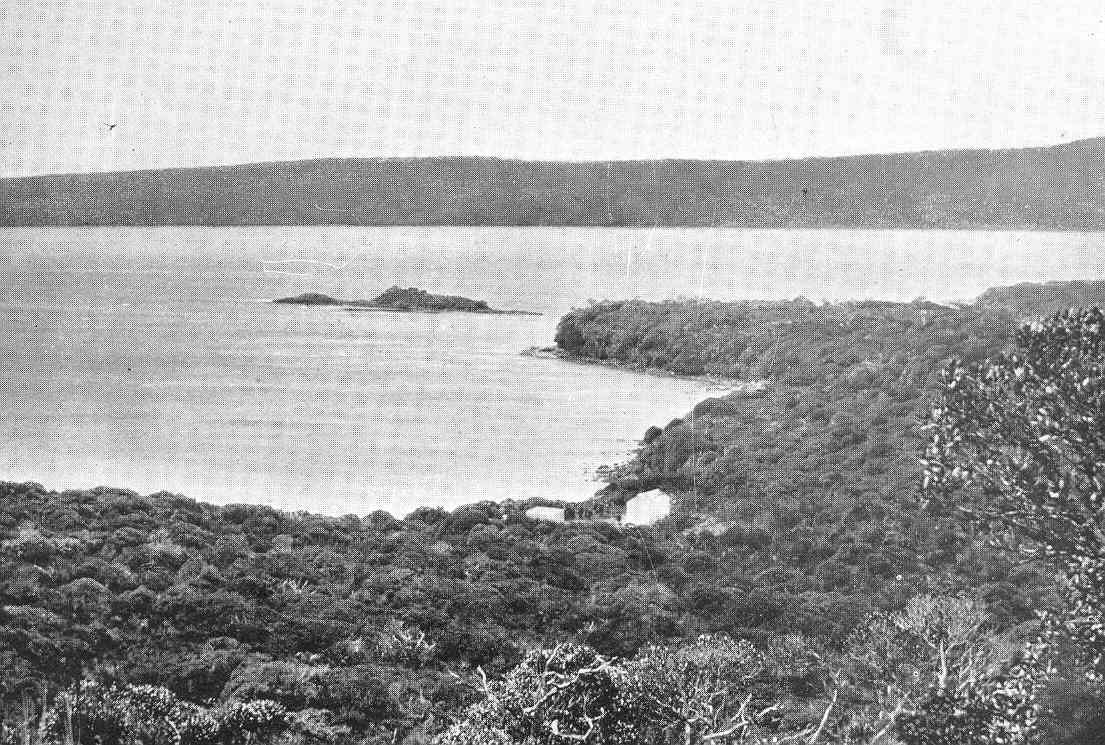
Port Ross (1909)

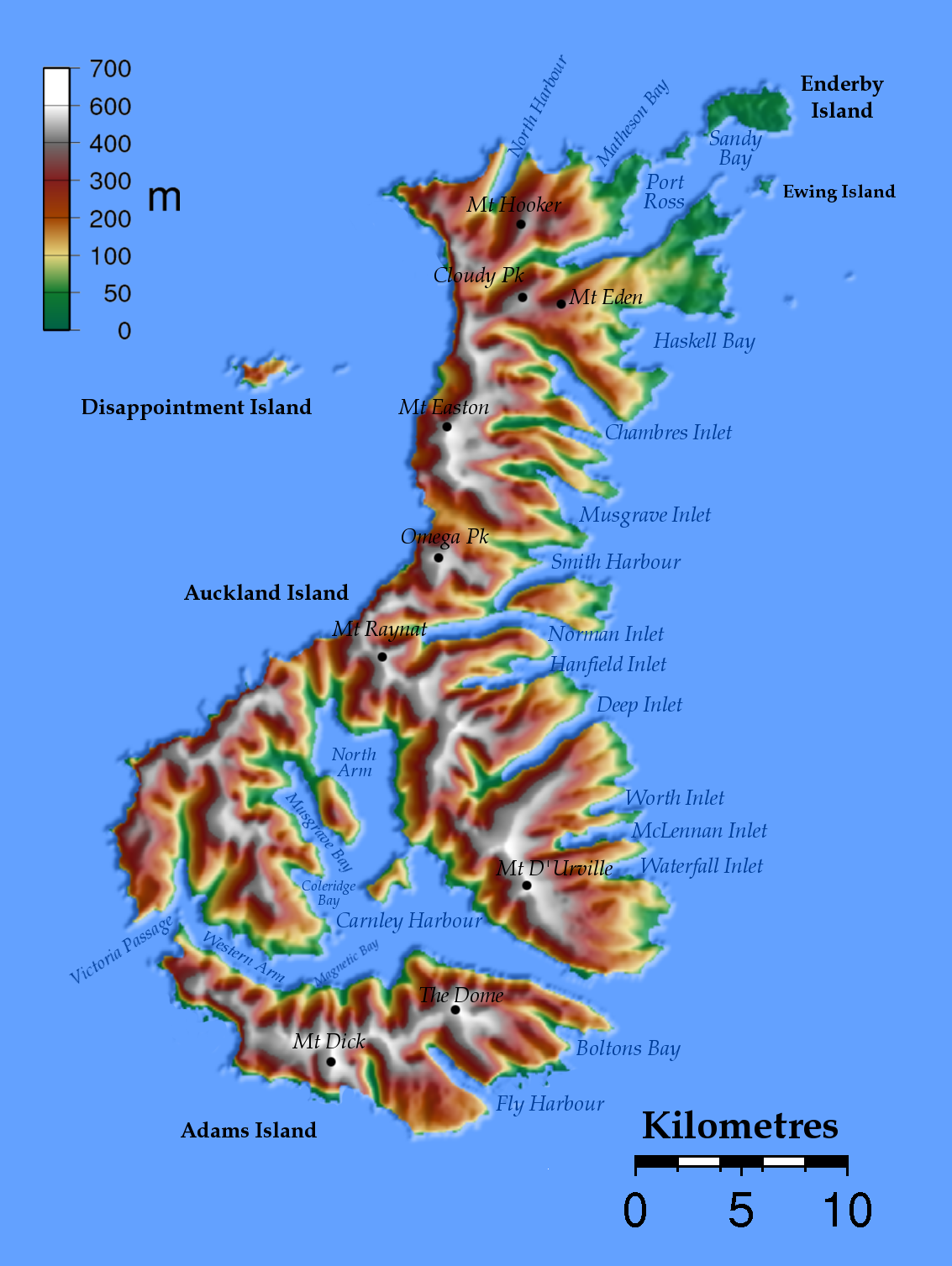
The Auckland group

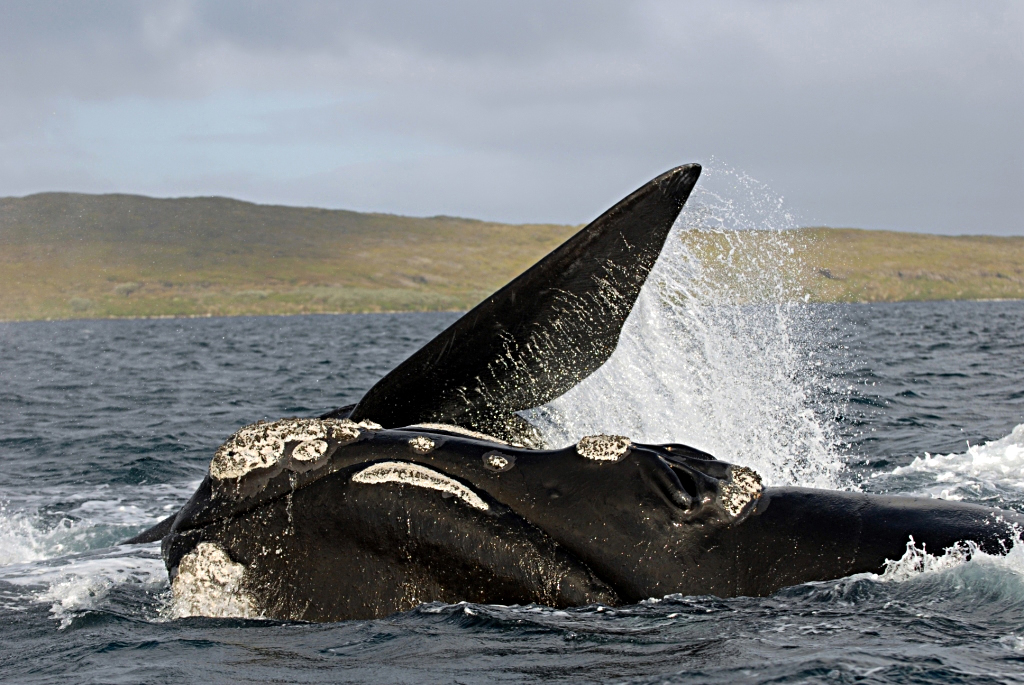
Southern right whales in Port Ross

Port Ross is a natural harbour on Auckland Island in the Auckland Islands Group, a subantarctic chain that forms part of the New Zealand Outlying Islands.

Guarding the mouth of Port Ross are Rose Island, Enderby Island, Ewing Island, and the tiny Ocean Island.

The harbour is a key calving and socialising ground for southern right whales in New Zealand waters.

In 1842, members of the Ngāti Mutunga Māori arrived in Port Ross from the Chatham Islands with Moriori slaves in an attempt to establish a settlement.

In the late 1840s, an agricultural and whaling community set up in Erebus Cove, on the harbour, and named Hardwicke. Due to the inhospitable climate, the settlement was abandoned within three years. A cemetery remains, later used to bury victims of shipwrecks. Survivors of the 1866 wreck of the General Grant set up a camp in the harbour, where they lived for 18 months before rescue. Later, castaway depots were established in Port Ross to provide succour for any sailors wrecked or marooned on the islands. In 1887, it provided relief for the survivors of the Derry Castle. It was also one of three sites occupied by the wartime Cape Expedition coastwatching stations established on New Zealand's subantarctic islands.

== See also ==
- List of inlets of the Auckland Islands
