= James Teer =

New Zealand gold miner

James Teer (c. 1826 – 30 April 1887) was a New Zealand goldminer, mariner and castaway. He was born in Newcastle, County Down, Ireland, in about 1826. He emigrated to Australia at the age of 18. He was a passenger aboard the General Grant when it was shipwrecked in the Auckland Islands, and was one of only 10 survivors out of a total of 83 people aboard.

== Bibliography ==
- Allen, M. F.; Scadden, K. (2009). The General Grant's Gold: Shipwreck and Greed in the Southern Ocean. Auckland: Exisle. ISBN 9781775590200.
- Ormsby, M. L. (1993). "Teer, James". Dictionary of New Zealand Biography. Wellington: Ministry for Culture and Heritage.
