= Derry Castle =

British three-masted barque

Coordinates: 50.484323°S 166.302761°E

History

United Kingdom
- Name: Derry Castle
- Builder: Dobie and Company, Govan, Glasgow
- Yard number: 136
- Launched: 16 October 1883
- Identification: Official Number 86651
- Fate: Lost off Enderby Island, 20 March 1887

General characteristics
- Class & type: Iron barque
- Tonnage: 1367 GRT; 1317 NRT
- Length: 239.8 ft (73.1 m)
- Beam: 35.9 ft (10.9 m)
- Depth: 21.4 ft (6.5 m)
- Sail plan: Barque-rigged

The Derry Castle was a 1,367 ton iron barque built at Glasgow in 1883, and initially operating out of Limerick, Ireland. She had been registered there on 19 November 1883 by Francis Spaight & Sons. In 1887 while voyaging from Australia to the United Kingdom with a cargo of wheat, she foundered off Enderby Island, in the subantarctic Auckland Islands, on a reef which now bears her name.

== Design and construction ==
The three-masted barque Derry Castle was built of iron in Govan, Glasgow, by Dobie and Company. registered tonnages were 1,367 gross and 1,317 net, and dimensions were length 239.8 feet (73.1 m), beam 35.9 feet (10.9 m), and depth 21.4 feet (6.5 m).

Derry Castle was launched on 16 October 1883 for shipowner James Spaight of Francis Spaight & Sons. The company was based in Limerick, Ireland, and the family home was at nearby Derry Castle, County Tipperary. The ship was registered at Limerick on 19 November and commenced her maiden voyage from Glasgow on 26 December under Captain J Goffe for Fiji.

== Shipwreck ==
On 12 March 1887 Derry Castle sailed from Geelong, Victoria, still under Captain Goffe, and under charter to Gibbs, Bright & Co., with a cargo of wheat for Falmouth, Cornwall, or Queenstown, County Cork, where she would receive orders for discharge. In the early hours of 20 March 1887, eight days into her voyage, in strong winds and sailing at 12 knots (22 km/h; 14 mph), Derry Castle ran onto a reef off Enderby Island and immediately began breaking up. Manned by a crew of twenty-three, she carried one passenger and a cargo of wheat.

Only the passenger and seven of the 23 crew made it ashore. At that time the New Zealand government maintained a number of castaway depots on their subantarctic islands equipped with emergency supplies. Unfortunately, the depot at Sandy Bay on Enderby Island had been looted of all but a bottle of salt. The castaways constructed crude shelters and subsisted on shellfish and a small quantity of wheat recovered from the wreck. On a cliff overlooking the water, they buried the bodies of their fellow crew members that had washed ashore. The grave was marked with the ship's figurehead.

A box of matches proved ineffective at producing a flame, despite drying, but the survivors, by detonating the charge in a revolver bullet, were able to start a fire, which they maintained until leaving the island. After 92 days they discovered an axe head in the sand and were able to build a boat, which became known as the Derry Castle Punt, from the wreckage. Two men navigated the boat to nearby Erebus Cove, Port Ross on Auckland Island, where they obtained supplies from the government depot there. The group lived at Port Ross until rescued by the 45 ton schooner Awarua on 19 July.

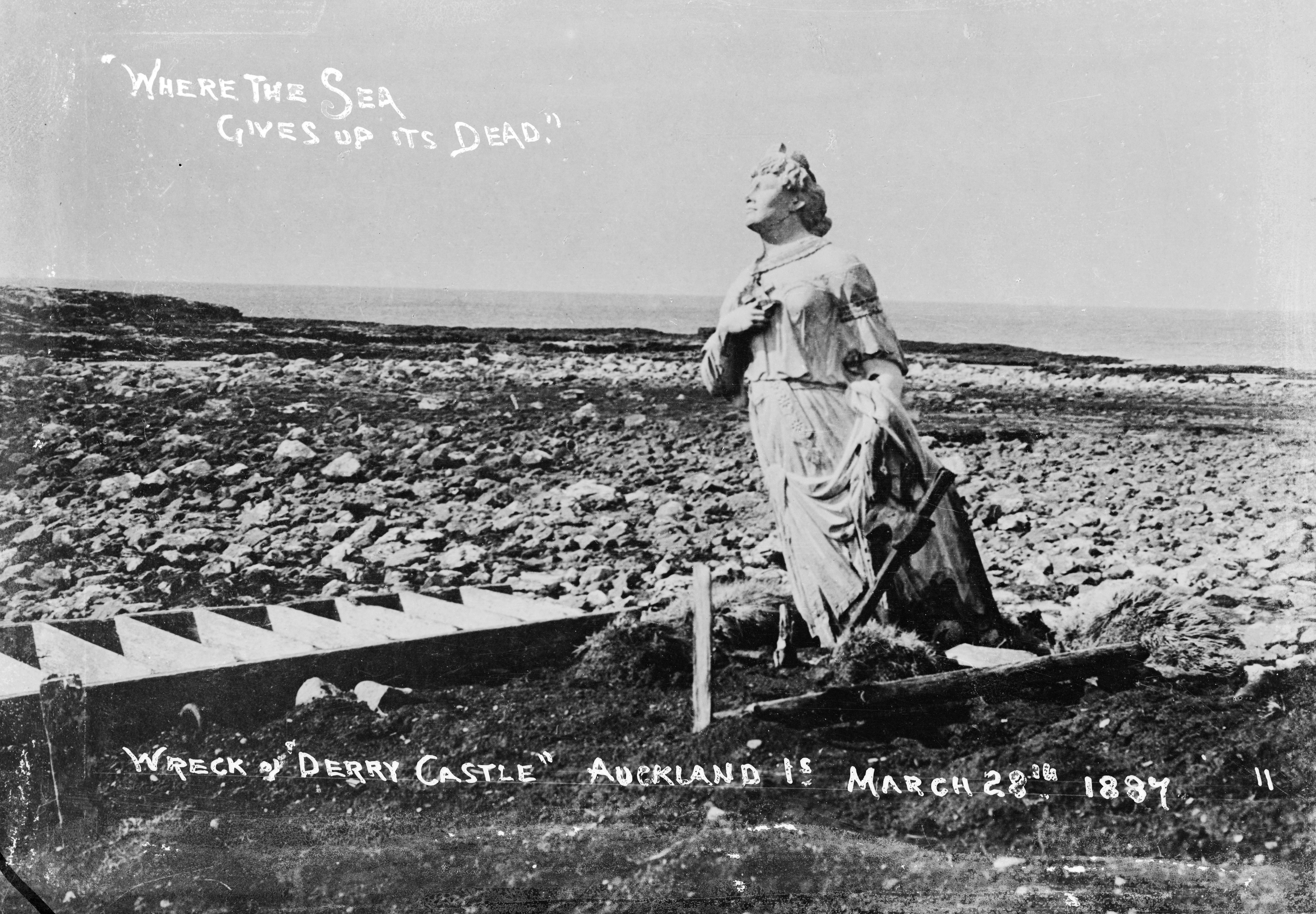
Derry Castle's figurehead served as a grave marker for victims of the wreck

The Awarua arrived in Hobson's Bay, Victoria on 21 September 1887, returning from an illegal sealing expedition in the Auckland Islands. News of the arrival reached Lloyd's of London on the same day, shortly before she was due to have been declared a "missing vessel".

The punt remained on the Main Auckland Island until in 1989, when during an expedition which included artists Bill Hammond, Laurence Aberhart, Geerda Leenards and Lloyd Godman, it was transported back to the Southland Museum and Art Gallery at Invercargill on a Royal New Zealand Navy vessel where it is on permanent display. The Castle grave site was maintained for many years by the New Zealand government until it sank into the ground. However, during World War II, the figurehead was resurrected by those stationed on the islands. The figurehead can now be viewed (along with other items from the wreck) at the Canterbury Museum in Christchurch, New Zealand. The makeshift punt was used as a grave headstone for a while before being removed to the Southland Museum, where it is on display. In its place, a plaque now marks the site of the sailors' graves.
