= Ewing Island (New Zealand) =

Island of the Auckland group in the subantarctic South Pacific

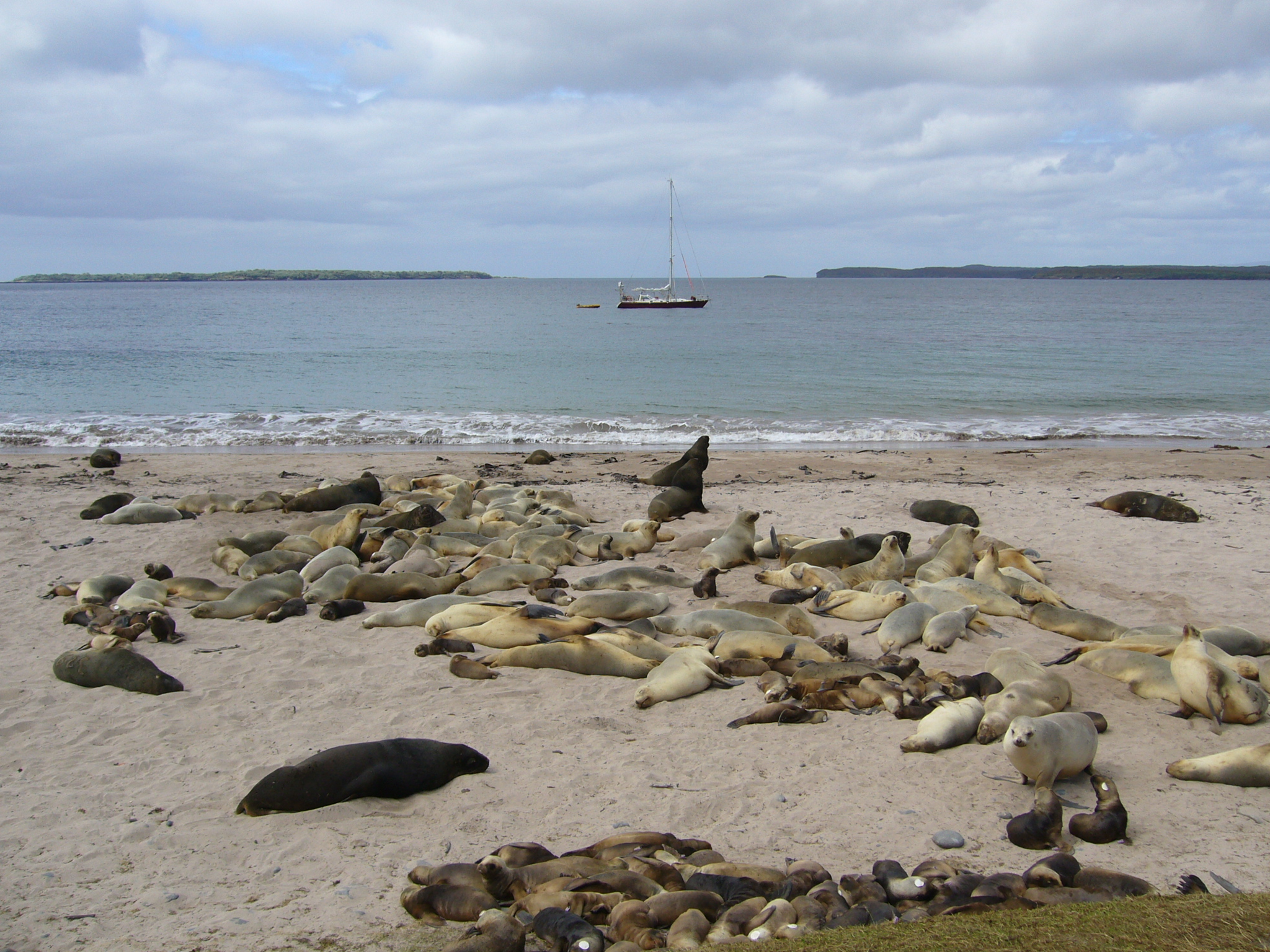
- Ewing Island – on the LHS
- Interactive map of Ewing Island

Geography
- Coordinates: 50.528557°S 166.303812°E
- Archipelago: Auckland Islands
- Area: 0.6 km^{2} (0.23 sq mi)
- Length: 1.42 km (0.882 mi)
- Width: 1.10 km (0.684 mi)

Administration
- New Zealand

Demographics
- Population: 0

Ewing Island is an uninhabited island, part of the Auckland Islands group, a subantarctic chain that forms part of the New Zealand outlying islands. It lies in the north-east of the group, close to the mouth of Port Ross, immediately to the south of the larger Enderby Island and off the north-eastern tip of the main Auckland Island.

== Important Bird Area ==
The island is part of the Auckland Island group Important Bird Area (IBA), identified as such by BirdLife International because of the significance of the group as a breeding site for several species of seabirds, as well as the endemic Auckland shag, Auckland teal, Auckland rail and Auckland snipe. Both red-crowned parakeets and yellow-crowned parakeets live on Ewing Island, making this the second southernmost location of living parrots.

== See also ==
- Scientific Committee on Antarctic Research
- New Zealand subantarctic islands
- List of Antarctic and subantarctic islands
- List of islands of New Zealand
- List of islands
- Desert island
