= Enderby Island =

Island of the New Zealand-administered Auckland group in the subantarctic South Pacific

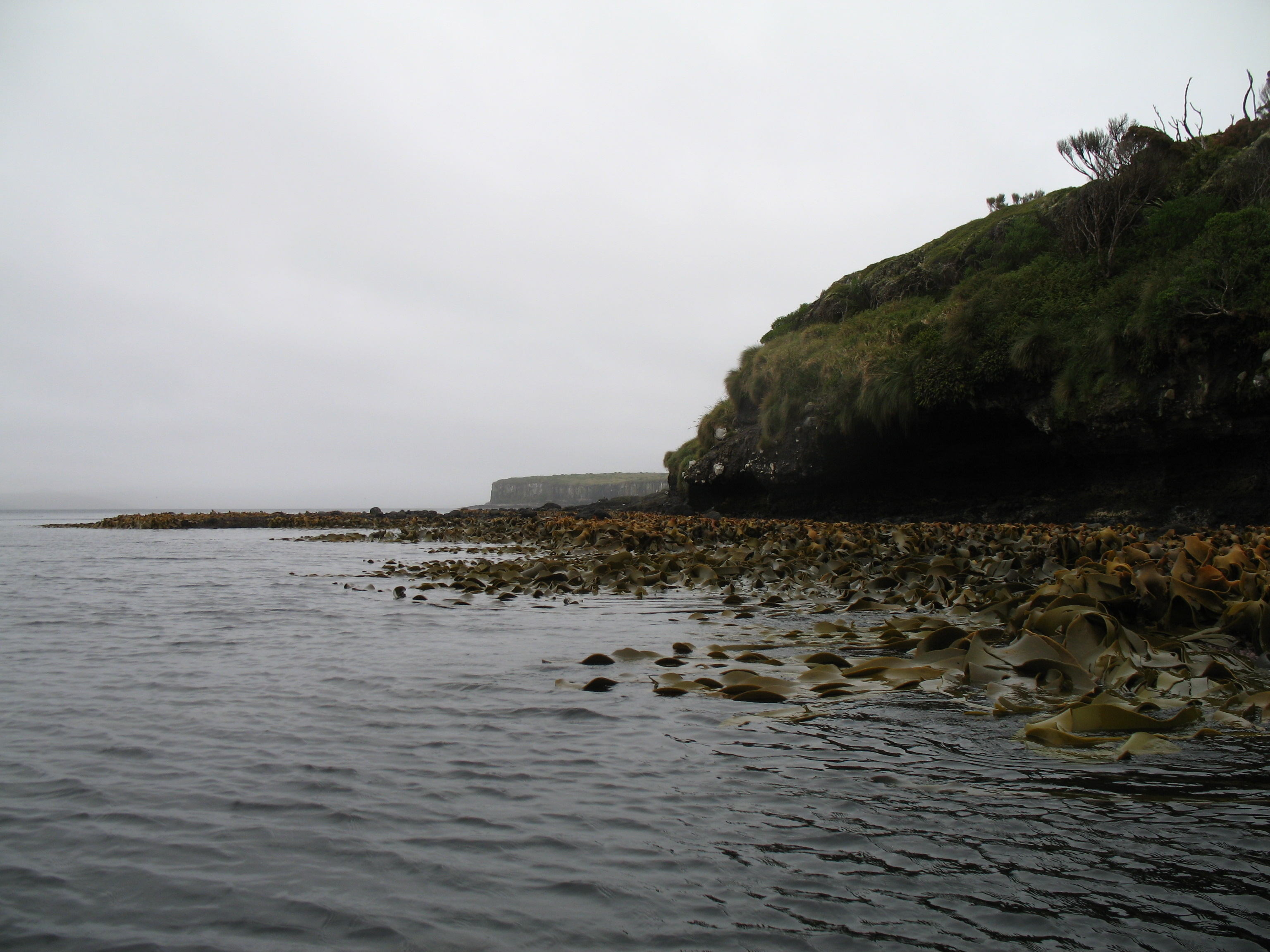
- A view along the coast of Enderby Island

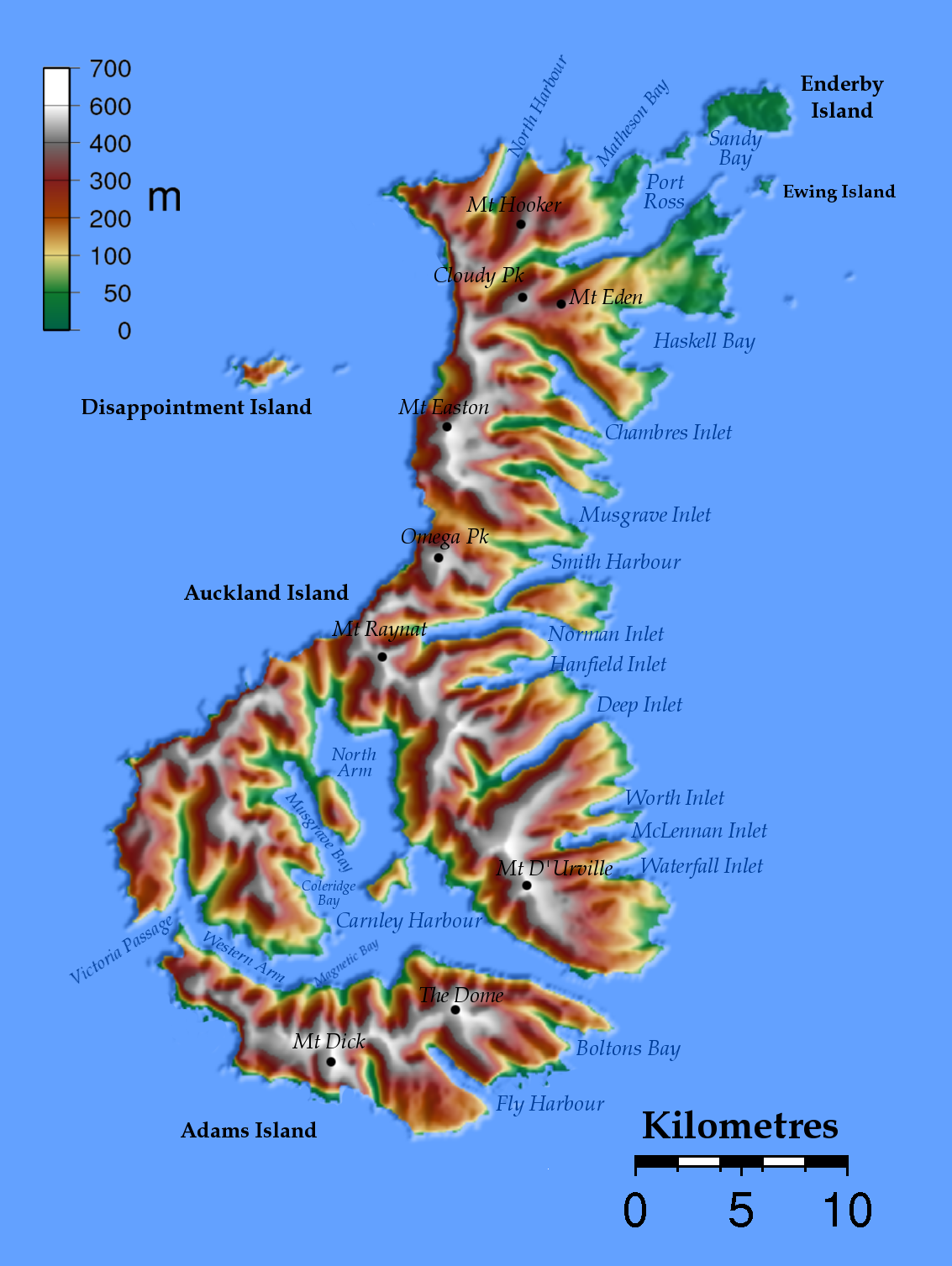
- Topographical map of the Auckland Islands

Geography
- Coordinates: 50°29′45″S 166°17′44″E
- Archipelago: Auckland Islands

Administration
- New Zealand

Enderby Island is part of New Zealand's uninhabited Auckland Islands archipelago, south of mainland New Zealand. It is situated just off the northern tip of Auckland Island, the largest island in the archipelago.

== Geography and geology ==
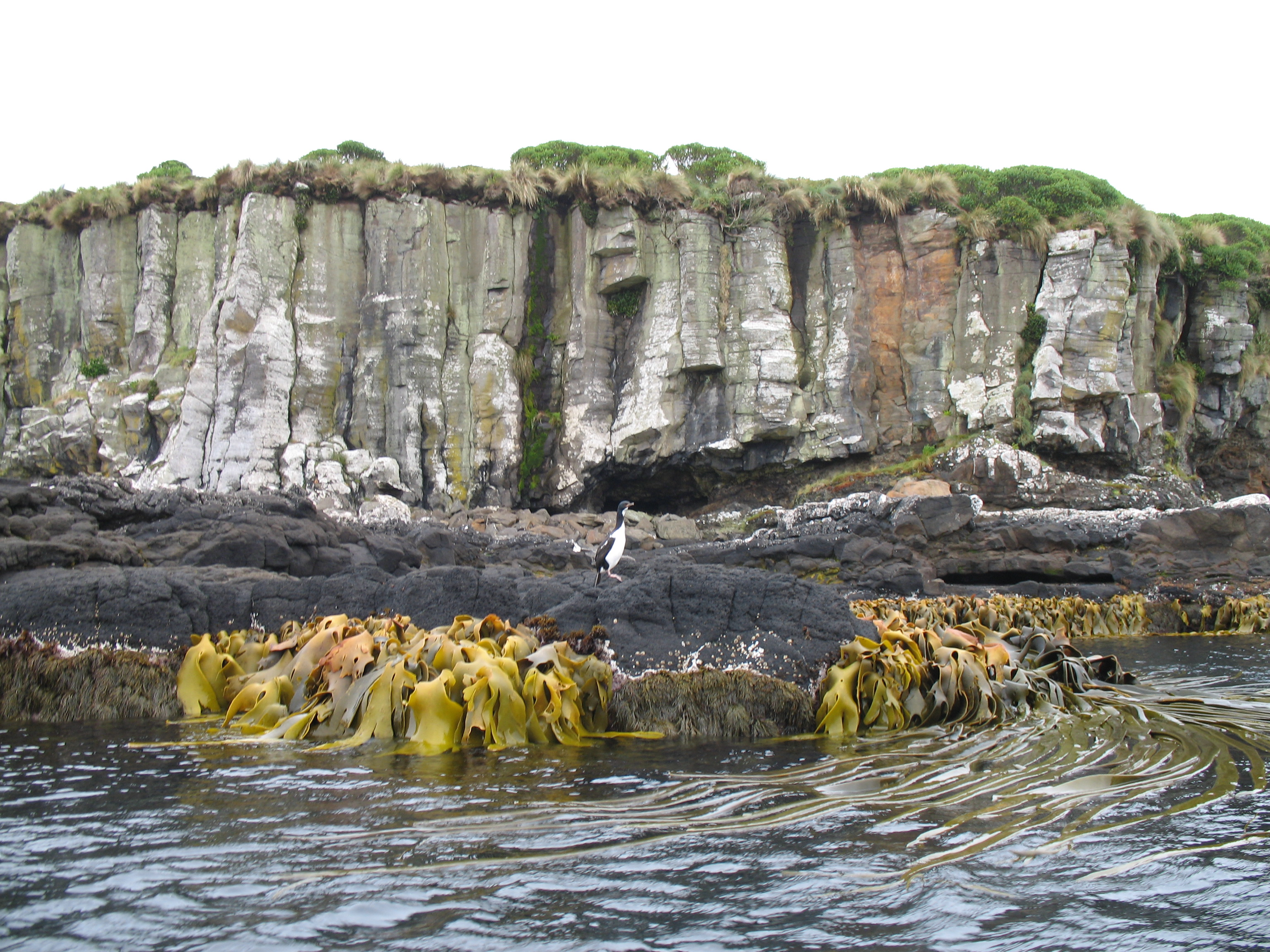
A view of the Enderby Island coastline, showing its volcanic composition (with Durvillaea kelp and an Auckland shag).

Enderby Island lies off the northeastern extremity of Auckland Island, directly across from the mouth of Port Ross, from which it is separated by some 3 kilometres (1.9 mi). Several islands lie in the strait between the two islands, notably Rose, Ewing, and Ocean Islands. Of these, Rose Island lies between the two closest points on Auckland and Enderby Island, separated from them by two narrow channels, each some 400 metres (440 yd) in width. The island comprises around 1% of the total land area of the Auckland island group.

Enderby Island has few notable geographic features. It is surrounded by cliffs and rocky shorelines, with the only landing point being at Sandy Bay in the island's southwest. Several historic huts are located at this bay, which is also home to a breeding colony of New Zealand sea lions. Much of the island's interior is bog and wetland, drained by numerous small streams. A small lake, Teal Lake, is located close to the southeastern shore. The island's northernmost point, also the northernmost point in the Auckland Islands, is Derry Castle Reef, named after the ship Derry Castle, which foundered there in 1887.

Enderby Island is perched on the Campbell Plateau and is composed of eroding volcanic remains from eruptions that occurred between 25 and 10 million years ago.

== History ==
Polynesian explorers arrived at Enderby Island in the 13th or 14th centuries, about the time mainland New Zealand was settled. Archaeological excavations revealed their presence at Sandy Bay, in a sheltered and relatively hospitable location, accessible to seal colonies. Excavated earth ovens contained the bones of seals and sea lions, fishes, albatrosses and petrels, and the shells of mussels. The Polynesians stayed for one or more summers and left behind scrapers, tools, and fish hooks.

After the Polynesians departed, the Auckland Islands were uninhabited until they were rediscovered by Abraham Bristow aboard the whaling ship Ocean in 1806. He named the island after the owners of his ship, Samuel Enderby & Sons.

=== Derry Castle ===
On 20 March 1887, Derry Castle, an iron barque registered in Boston, Massachusetts, ran aground off Enderby Island nine days into its journey. The ship was en route from Geelong, Victoria to Falmouth, Cornwall and was crewed by a complement of twenty-three sailors. It carried one passenger and a cargo of wheat. The Derry Castle was owned by P. Richardson & Co. and was under the command of Captain J. Goffe.

The surviving members of the Derry Castle crew found a castaway depot at Sandy Bay. They proceeded to construct some further crude shelters around this depot. On a cliff overlooking the water, they buried the bodies of their fellow crew members that had washed ashore. The grave was marked with the ship's figurehead.

After 192 days the Derry Castle was officially posted as missing by Lloyd's of London. On 21 September 1887, a 45-ton steamer, the Awarua, arrived in Hobson's Bay, Victoria, Australia, returning from an illegal sealing expedition in the Auckland Islands. On board the Awarua were the remaining eight survivors from the Derry Castle.

The Derry Castle grave site was maintained for many years by the New Zealand government until it sank into the ground. However, during World War II, the ship's figurehead was resurrected by coastwatchers stationed on the islands in the Cape Expedition programme. The figurehead can now be viewed (along with other items from the wreck) at the Canterbury Museum in Christchurch, New Zealand. In its place, a tombstone now marks the site of the sailors' graves.

== Fauna ==
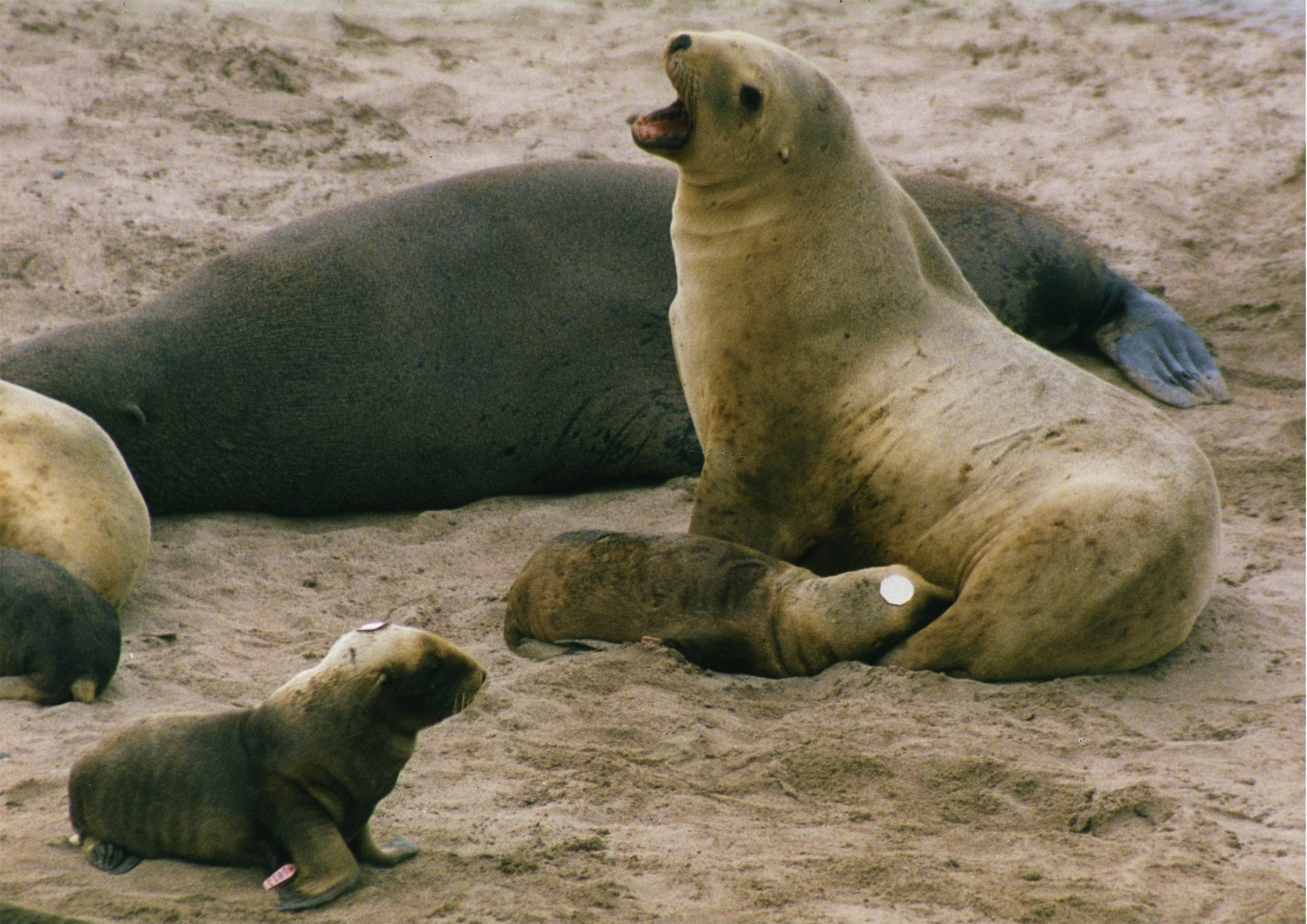
A New Zealand sea lion nursing on the beach

=== Important Bird Area ===
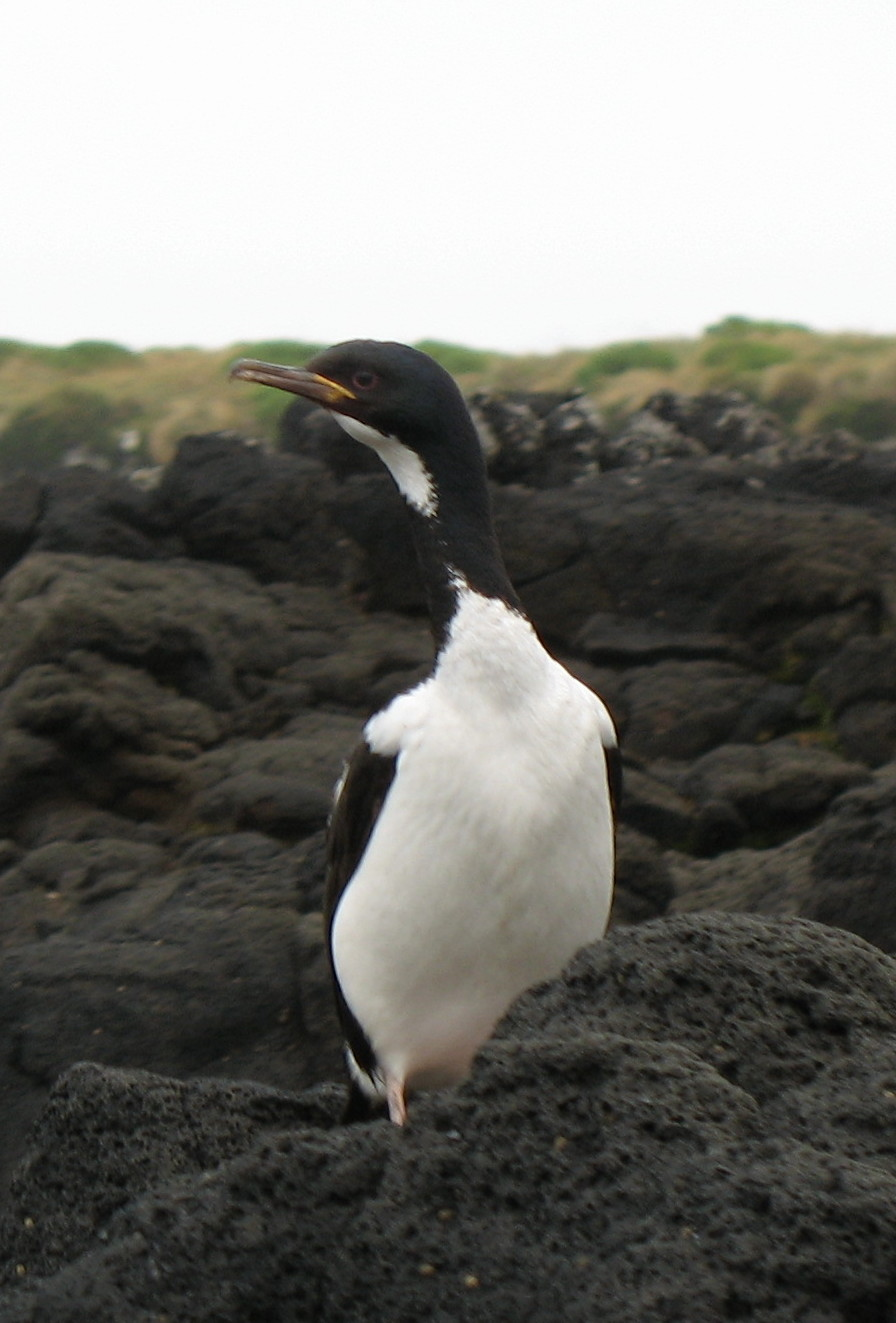
An Auckland shag on Enderby Island

Enderby Island was cleared of introduced species, such as cattle, pig, rabbit and rat in 1994, and by 2015 the abundance of wildlife was notable compared with Auckland Island. The island is part of the Auckland Island group Important Bird Area (IBA), identified as such by BirdLife International because of the significance of the group as a breeding site for several species of seabirds as well as the endemic Auckland shag, Auckland teal and Auckland snipe.

Other fauna include the brown skua, New Zealand pipit, New Zealand sea lion, northern giant petrel and yellow-eyed penguin. Dominant vegetation include rata forest and megaherbs such as the Campbell Island carrot.

Holocene bird bones recovered from sand dunes on Enderby Island largely comprise seabirds still found in the Auckland Islands today, but the abundance of certain species has changed over time.

=== Cattle ===
As with rabbits, cattle were introduced to Enderby Island in the late 19th century. Shorthorn cattle were brought to the island by whalers in 1894 where they proceeded to survive on kelp and other island flora, becoming a distinctive wild variety. By the mid-1980s, the cattle had nearly denuded Enderby Island of its growth, a problem that came to the attention of New Zealand's Department of Conservation. In response, efforts were made to eradicate cattle on the island. By the mid-1990s, only one cow, 'Lady', remained. Lady was taken to mainland New Zealand in February 1993. Since then she has been the subject of intense efforts to save the variety, efforts that have included cloning. Lady died in May 2009, aged more than twenty years.

=== Rabbits ===
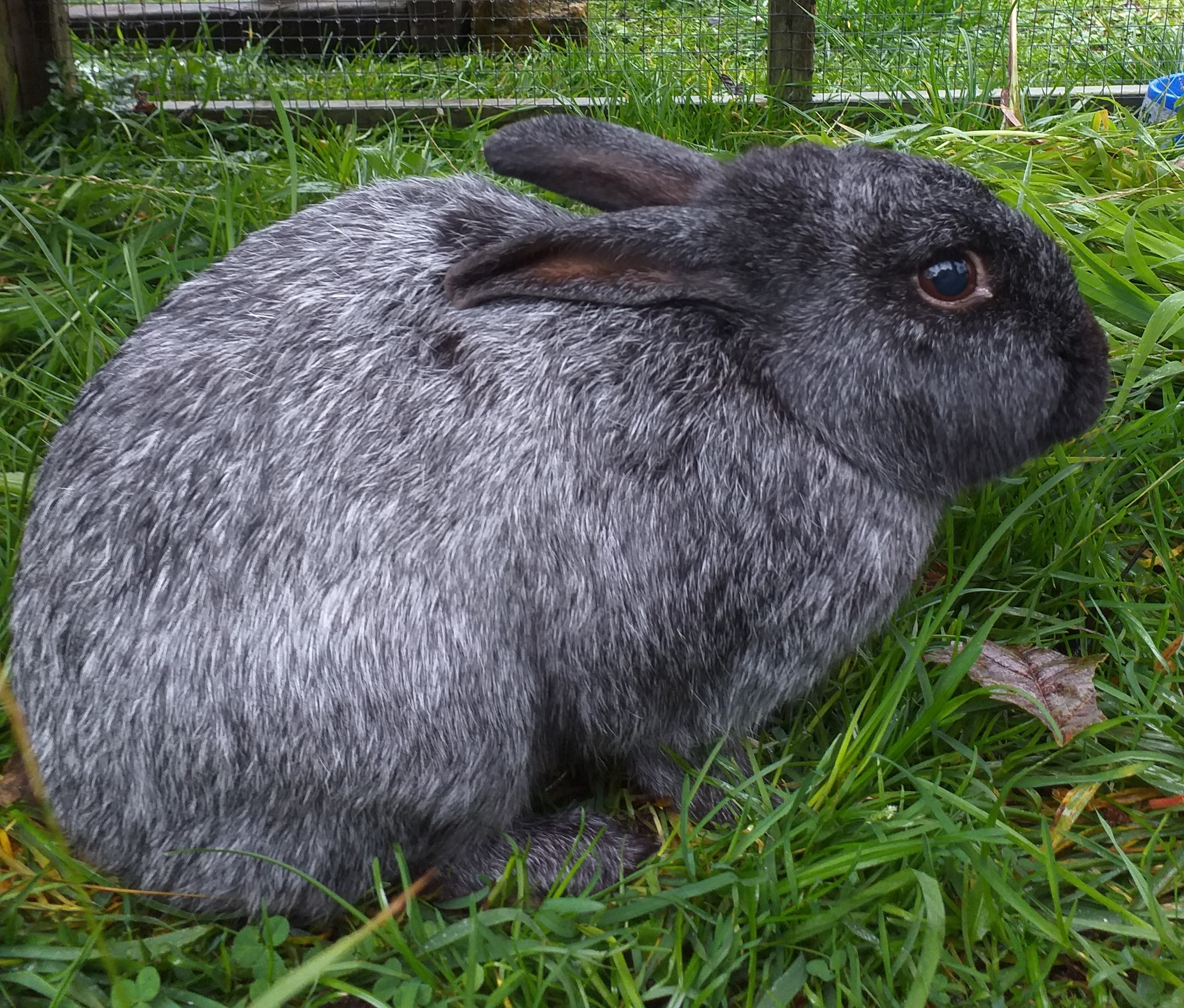
Enderby Island Rabbit

A distinct variety of rabbit lived on Enderby Island. Rabbits are not indigenous to the island; their ancestors were brought from Australia in October 1865 to serve as food for shipwreck survivors. Following their introduction, the population was isolated for almost 130 years. The rabbits were eradicated from the island in the early 1990s, though some were rescued and the breed survives in captivity. Enderby Island rabbits are predominantly silver-grey in colour but a recessive gene ensures that a small percentage is cream or beige.

== Climate ==
Climate data for Enderby Island (1991–2020 normals, extremes 1991–present)
Month	Jan	Feb	Mar	Apr	May	Jun	Jul	Aug	Sep	Oct	Nov	Dec	Year
Record high °C (°F)	16.9 (62.4)	17.2 (63.0)	16.1 (61.0)	13.8 (56.8)	13.6 (56.5)	12.4 (54.3)	13.2 (55.8)	11.8 (53.2)	12.6 (54.7)	12.7 (54.9)	14.0 (57.2)	16.9 (62.4)	17.2 (63.0)
Mean maximum °C (°F)	14.4 (57.9)	14.4 (57.9)	13.7 (56.7)	12.6 (54.7)	11.6 (52.9)	10.3 (50.5)	10.2 (50.4)	10.2 (50.4)	10.7 (51.3)	11.6 (52.9)	12.6 (54.7)	13.7 (56.7)	14.9 (58.8)
Mean daily maximum °C (°F)	12.4 (54.3)	12.4 (54.3)	11.6 (52.9)	10.5 (50.9)	9.2 (48.6)	8.1 (46.6)	7.8 (46.0)	8.2 (46.8)	8.8 (47.8)	9.6 (49.3)	10.4 (50.7)	11.7 (53.1)	10.1 (50.1)
Daily mean °C (°F)	10.3 (50.5)	10.3 (50.5)	9.7 (49.5)	8.7 (47.7)	7.5 (45.5)	6.3 (43.3)	6.1 (43.0)	6.4 (43.5)	6.8 (44.2)	7.4 (45.3)	8.2 (46.8)	9.5 (49.1)	8.1 (46.6)
Mean daily minimum °C (°F)	8.2 (46.8)	8.2 (46.8)	7.7 (45.9)	6.8 (44.2)	5.7 (42.3)	4.4 (39.9)	4.3 (39.7)	4.5 (40.1)	4.8 (40.6)	5.1 (41.2)	5.9 (42.6)	7.3 (45.1)	6.1 (42.9)
Mean minimum °C (°F)	4.9 (40.8)	4.6 (40.3)	4.1 (39.4)	2.7 (36.9)	0.6 (33.1)	−0.5 (31.1)	−0.1 (31.8)	0.1 (32.2)	0.1 (32.2)	1.1 (34.0)	1.7 (35.1)	3.7 (38.7)	−1.8 (28.8)
Record low °C (°F)	1.2 (34.2)	2.7 (36.9)	2.0 (35.6)	−0.2 (31.6)	−2.9 (26.8)	−3.2 (26.2)	−4.2 (24.4)	−3.6 (25.5)	−1.9 (28.6)	−2.1 (28.2)	−0.5 (31.1)	1.7 (35.1)	−4.2 (24.4)
Average rainfall mm (inches)	104.7 (4.12)	89.1 (3.51)	110.2 (4.34)	90.3 (3.56)	99.4 (3.91)	84.1 (3.31)	75.8 (2.98)	68.2 (2.69)	86.9 (3.42)	89.8 (3.54)	89.9 (3.54)	87.1 (3.43)	1,075.5 (42.35)
Source: Earth Sciences NZ

== See also ==
- Auckland Islands
- Composite Antarctic Gazetteer
- List of Antarctic and subantarctic islands
- New Zealand Subantarctic Islands
- SCAR
- Territorial claims in Antarctica
- Horn Island, Tierra del Fuego, the most southerly known pre-European archaeological site.
