= Carnley Harbour =

Natural harbour in New Zealand

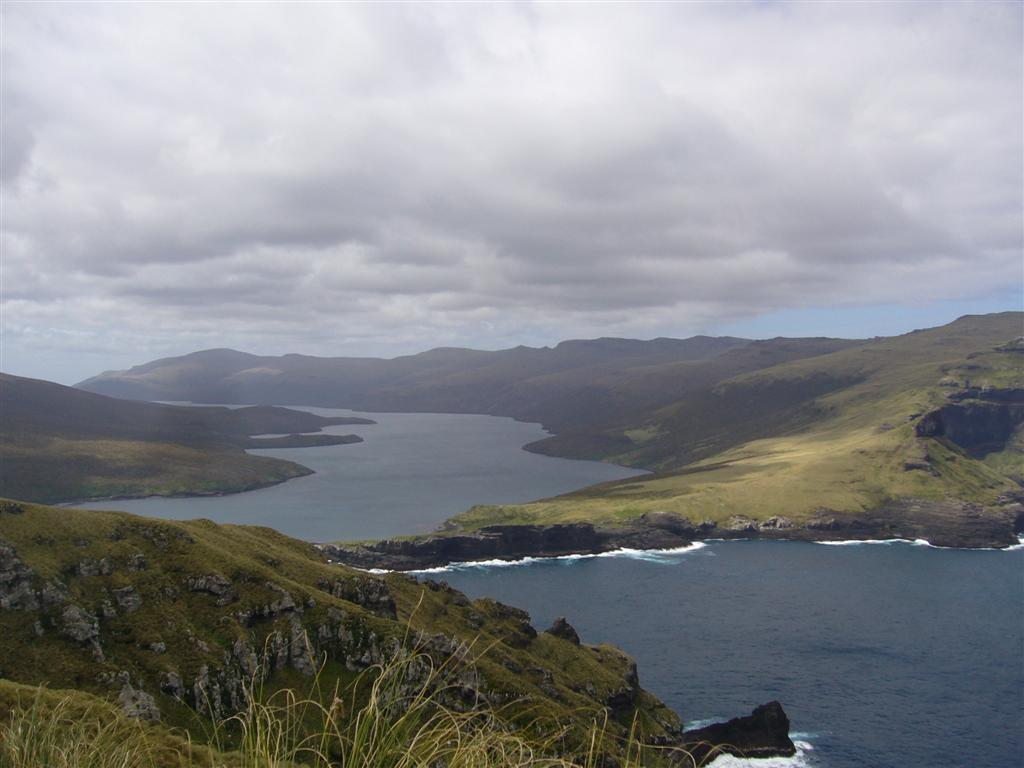
- Carnley Harbour, looking eastward
- Interactive map of Carnley Harbour
- Coordinates: 50.8374°S 166.0763°E
- Ocean/sea sources: Pacific Ocean
- Surface area: 72 km^{2} (28 sq mi)

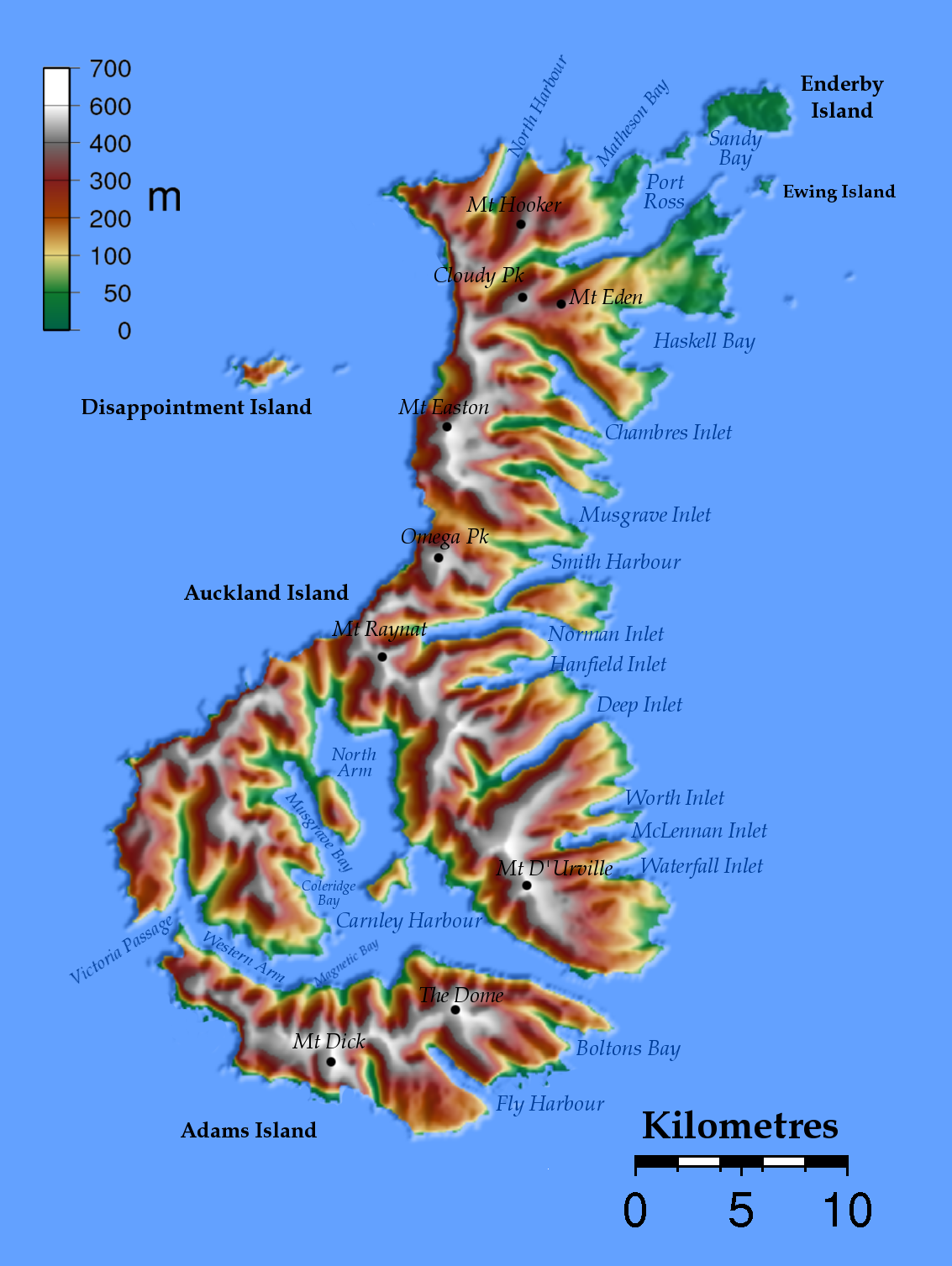
Carnley Harbour is north of Adams Island, the southern island

Carnley Harbour is a large natural harbour in the south of the Auckland Islands, part of the New Zealand Subantarctic Islands. Formed from the drowned crater of an extinct volcano, the harbour separates the mainland of Auckland Island to the north, from the smaller Adams Island in the south. The harbour is sometimes referred to as the Adams Straits.

== Geography ==
Carnley Harbour is the flooded caldera of an extinct and eroded shield volcano that was active between 10 and 25 million years ago. Musgrave Peninsula is approximately the centre of the caldera. The area of the harbour is 72 km^{2} (28 sq mi).

The harbour is undeveloped (the Auckland Islands are uninhabited), and has three major arms: North Arm, Musgrave Bay, and Western Arm. Of these, the first two are deep indentations in the coast of Auckland Island; the last connects with Victoria Passage to form a channel separating Auckland and Adams Islands.

== Wreck of the Grafton ==
In January 1864, the schooner Grafton was wrecked in the north arm of Carnley Harbour. The shipwrecked crew waited for a year to be rescued, but eventually a group of 3 made the 450 km (280 mi) journey to Stewart Island in a dinghy. They then arranged a rescue of the remaining crew. Despite the difficulties, all the crew survived. The Grafton is the earliest recorded shipwreck in the Auckland Islands.

== Anjou shipwreck survivors ==
Anjou was a French steel barque built in 1899 that was wrecked at Bristow Point on the west coast of Auckland Island on 5 February 1905. The crew of 22 made it ashore using the ships boats, and then travelled into Carnley Harbour. They discovered the castaway depot in Camp Cove and a notice that the depot received regular visits from the New Zealand Government steam ships. On 7 May 1905, they were rescued by Captain John Bollons and the Hinemoa. During their 3 month stay in Carnley Harbour the crew built shelters and survived using supplies from the castaway depot and local wildlife.

== SS Erlangen ==
On 28 August 1939, just before the outbreak of World War II, a German cargo vessel Erlangen left Port Chalmers in Dunedin so that its crew could avoid becoming prisoners. Erlangen was powered by a coal-fired steam engine, but was low on fuel when it left port. It entered Carnley Harbour on 30 August and anchored at the northern end of the North Arm. Over the next five weeks, the crew cleared around 1.2 ha (3 acres) of southern rātā forest, aiming to collect 400 tonnes of wood to fuel the vessel. New Zealand authorities suspected that the Erlangen could be in the Auckland Islands, and sent the cruiser HMS Leander to search for Erlangen. However, severe weather prevented Leander from entering Carnley Harbour, and the Erlangen was not discovered. On 7 October 1939, the Erlangen left her anchorage with only an additional 240 tonnes of wood fuel, but eventually reached Chile.

== Wartime coast watching ==
Cape Expedition was the intentionally vague name given to a secret five-year wartime programme of establishing coastwatching stations on New Zealand’s subantarctic islands. One of the coastwatching stations was established at Tagua Bay in Carnley Harbour. The first group of coastwatchers arrived in March 1941, and the programme continued until the end of the Pacific War in 1945.
