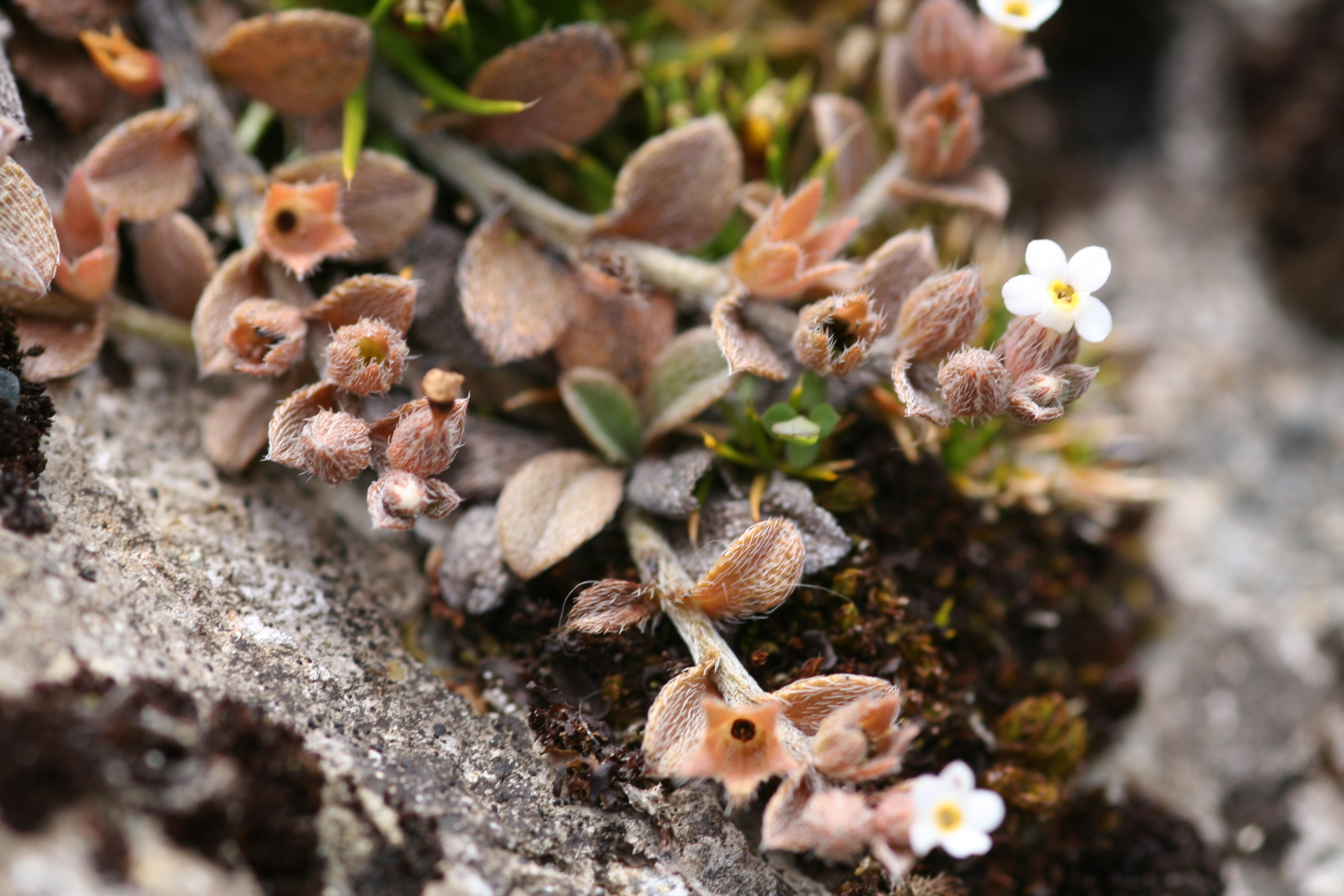

Conservation status
- Declining (NZ TCS)

Scientific classification
- Kingdom: Plantae
- Clade: Tracheophytes
- Clade: Angiosperms
- Clade: Eudicots
- Clade: Asterids
- Order: Boraginales
- Family: Boraginaceae
- Genus: Myosotis
- Species: M. antarctica
- Subspecies: M. a. subsp. traillii

Trinomial name
- Myosotis antarctica subsp. traillii Kirk

Synonyms
- Myosotis pygmaea Colenso nom. illeg.

= Myosotis antarctica subsp. traillii =

Subspecies of flowering plant

Myosotis antarctica subsp. traillii is a subspecies of flowering plant in the family Boraginaceae, native to New Zealand. Thomas Kirk (botanist) described the subspecies in 1921. Plants of this subspecies of forget-me-not are perennial with a prostrate habit, bracteate inflorescences, and white corollas.

== Taxonomy and etymology ==
Myosotis antarctica subsp. traillii Kirk is in the family Boraginaceae. Myosotis antarctica subsp. traillii was described in 1921 by Thomas Kirk from Stewart Island.

The latest taxonomic revision of recognizes an expanded M. antarctica which includes plants from mainland New Zealand, Campbell Island and Chile, including those previously called M. drucei (L.B.Moore) de Lange & Barkla and M. pygmaea Colenso (the latter is an illegitimate name). The two allopatric subspecies of M. antarctica are M. antarctica subsp. antarctica (previously M. antarctica from Campbell Island and Chile, and M. drucei from mainland New Zealand) and M. antarctica subsp. traillii (previously M. pygmaea Colenso from mainland New Zealand).

Myosotis antarctica subsp. traillii can be distinguished from M. antarctica subsp. antarctica by its curved, appressed to spreading hairs on the blade and edges of the rosette leaves. Plants of subsp. traillii are usually found on coastal localities in mainland New Zealand. By contrast, M. antarctica subsp. antarctica has flexuous, spreading to erect hairs on the blade and edges of the rosette leaves. Plants of subsp. antarctica are usually found at inland localities on mainland New Zealand, but can be coastal in Fiordland, Campbell Island and Chile.

The lectotype specimen of Myosotis antarctica subsp. traillii was collected by Thomas Kirk at Mason Bay, Stewart Island (Rakiura), is lodged at the herbarium of the Museum of New Zealand Te Papa Tongarewa (WELT SP002666).

The subspecific epithet, traillii, is likely a reference to either Charles Traill (1825-1891) or Arthur William Traill (1852-1936). Kirk described three taxa with the epithet traillii in the same paper: he named Olearia traillii after "Mr. C. Traill" and Aciphylla traillii after A.W. Traill, however he did not state anything in the description of M. antarctica subsp. traillii regarding which Traill it was named after.

== Phylogeny ==
Myosotis antarctica was shown to be a part of the monophyletic southern hemisphere lineage of Myosotis in phylogenetic analyses of standard DNA sequencing markers (nuclear ribosomal DNA and chloroplast DNA regions). Within the southern hemisphere lineage, species relationships were not well resolved. Sequences of both subspecies of M. antarctica (including some referred to as M. pygmaea and M. drucei) grouped with other New Zealand species that are morphologically similar, including M. brevis.

== Description ==
Myosotis antarctica subsp. traillii plants are single rosettes. The rosette leaves have petioles 1–20 mm long. The rosette leaf blades are 6–22 mm long by 3–15mm wide (length: width ratio usually 1.0–2.5: 1), oblanceolate obovate, widest at or above the middle, green or reddish-brown, with an obtuse apex. The upper surface of the leaf is densely covered in curved, appressed to patent, evenly-distributed antrorse (forward-facing) hairs, whereas the lower surface of the leaf is similar but with fewer hairs (ranging from glabrous to with sparsely distributed hairs). The hairs on the leaf edges are appressed. Each rosette has multiple prostrate, bracteate inflorescences that are up to 20 cm long. The basal cauline leaves are similar in size and shape to the rosette leaves and usually sessile, and become smaller distally along the inflorescence. Each inflorescence has up to 33 flowers, each borne on a very short pedicel, with a bract. The calyx is 1–3 mm long at flowering and 2–6 mm long at fruiting, lobed to one-third two-thirds its length, and hairs that are sometimes of two different lengths and types. The corolla is white or cream, up to 4 mm in diameter, with a cylindrical tube, and small yellow scales alternating with the petals. The anthers are very short (< 0.8 mm long) and fully included. The four smooth, shiny nutlets are 1.2–1.8 mm long by 0.8–1.2 mm wide and are ovoid in shape.

The chromosome number of M. antarctica subsp. traillii is n = 22 (AK 303514).

It flowers August–April and fruits September–April, with peak flowering and fruiting December–January.

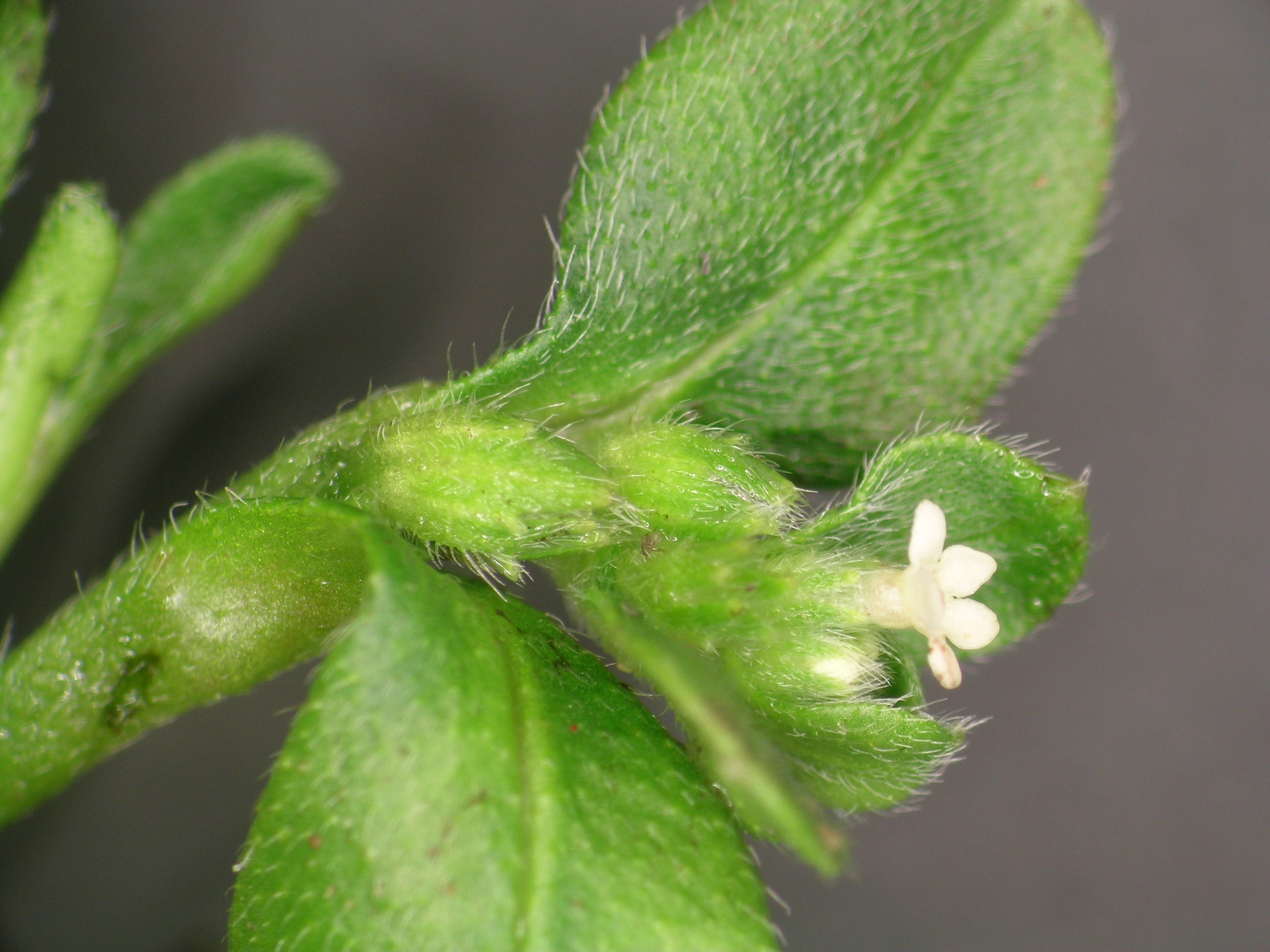
Floral detail

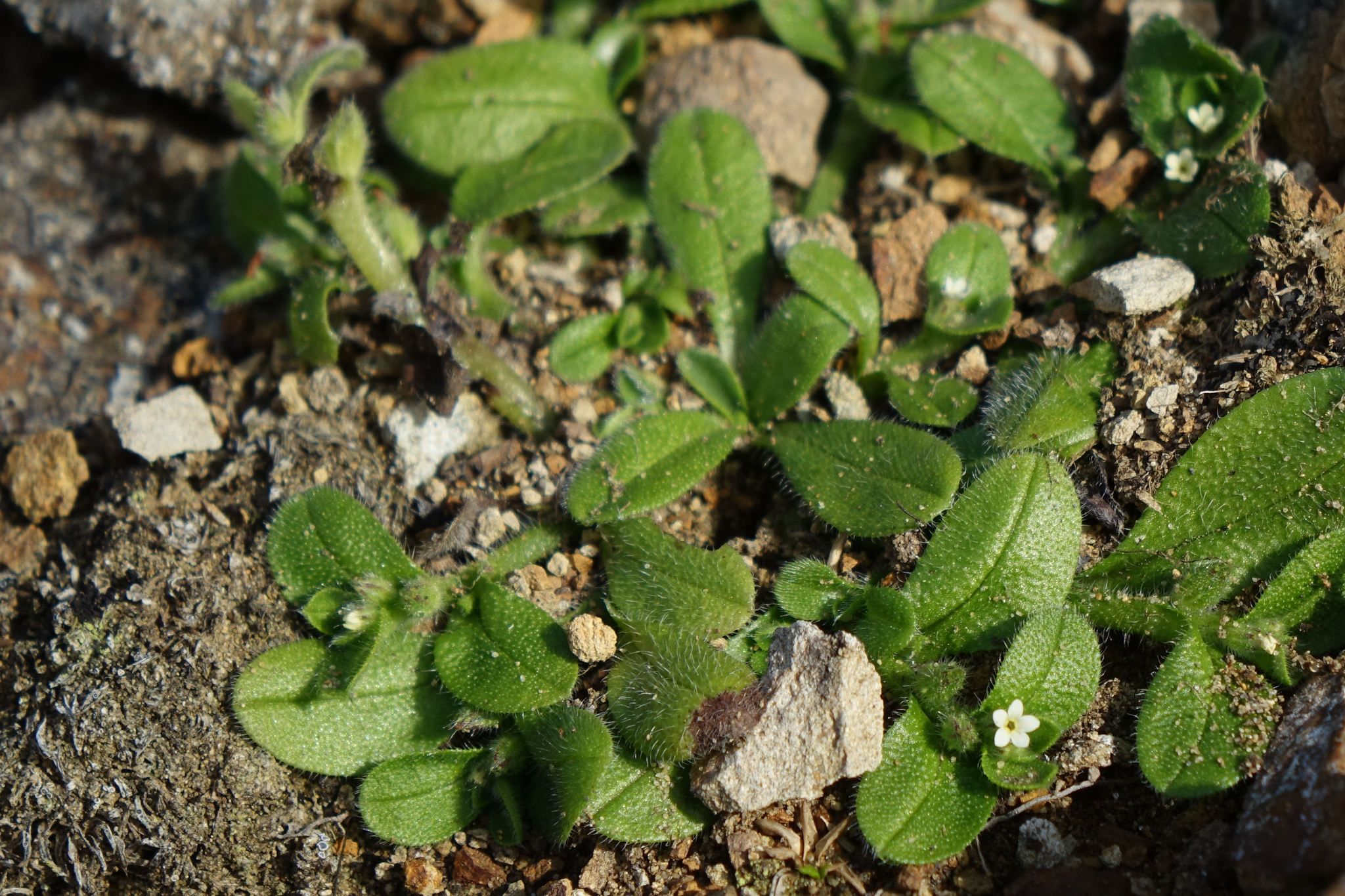
Growth habit

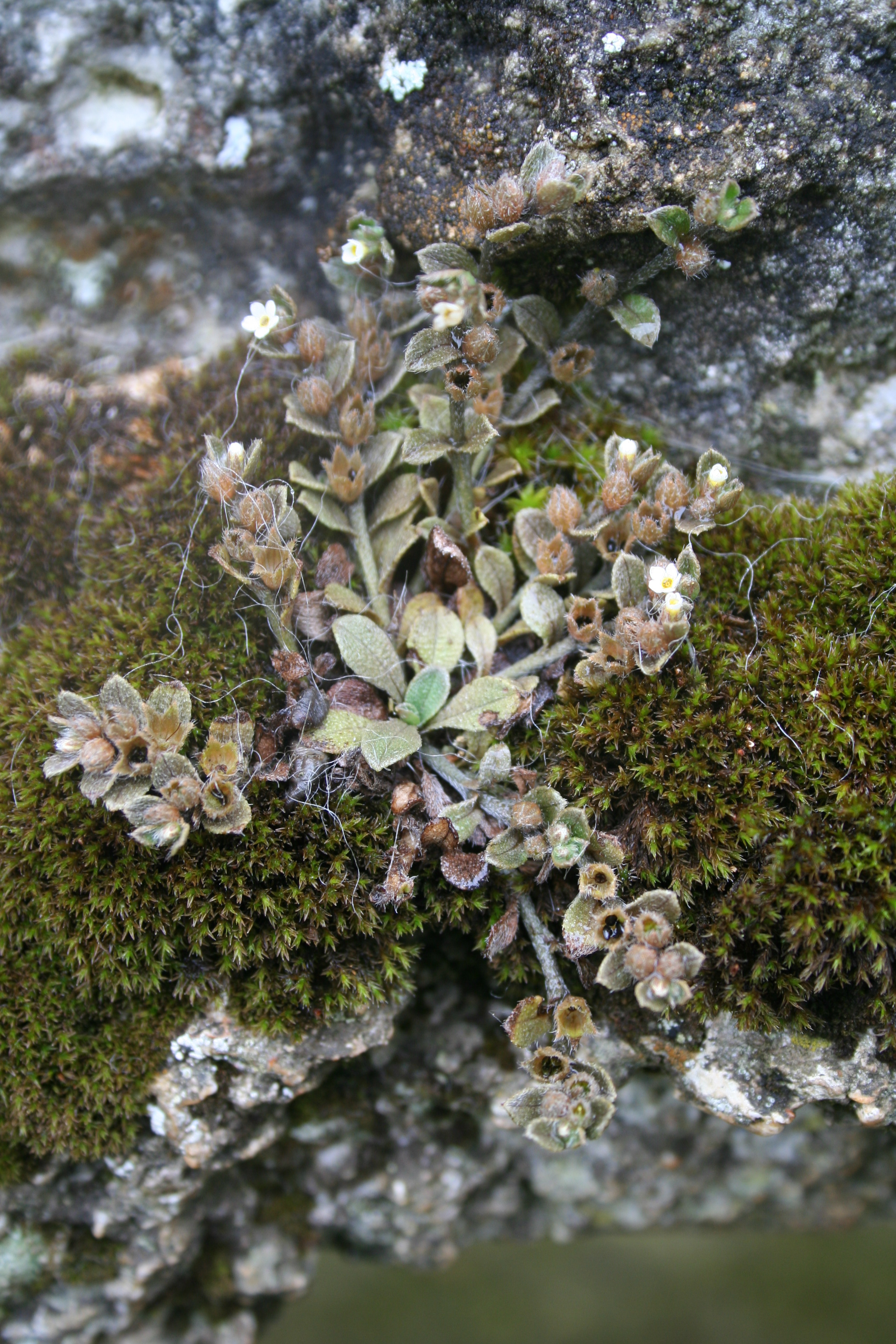
Growth habit

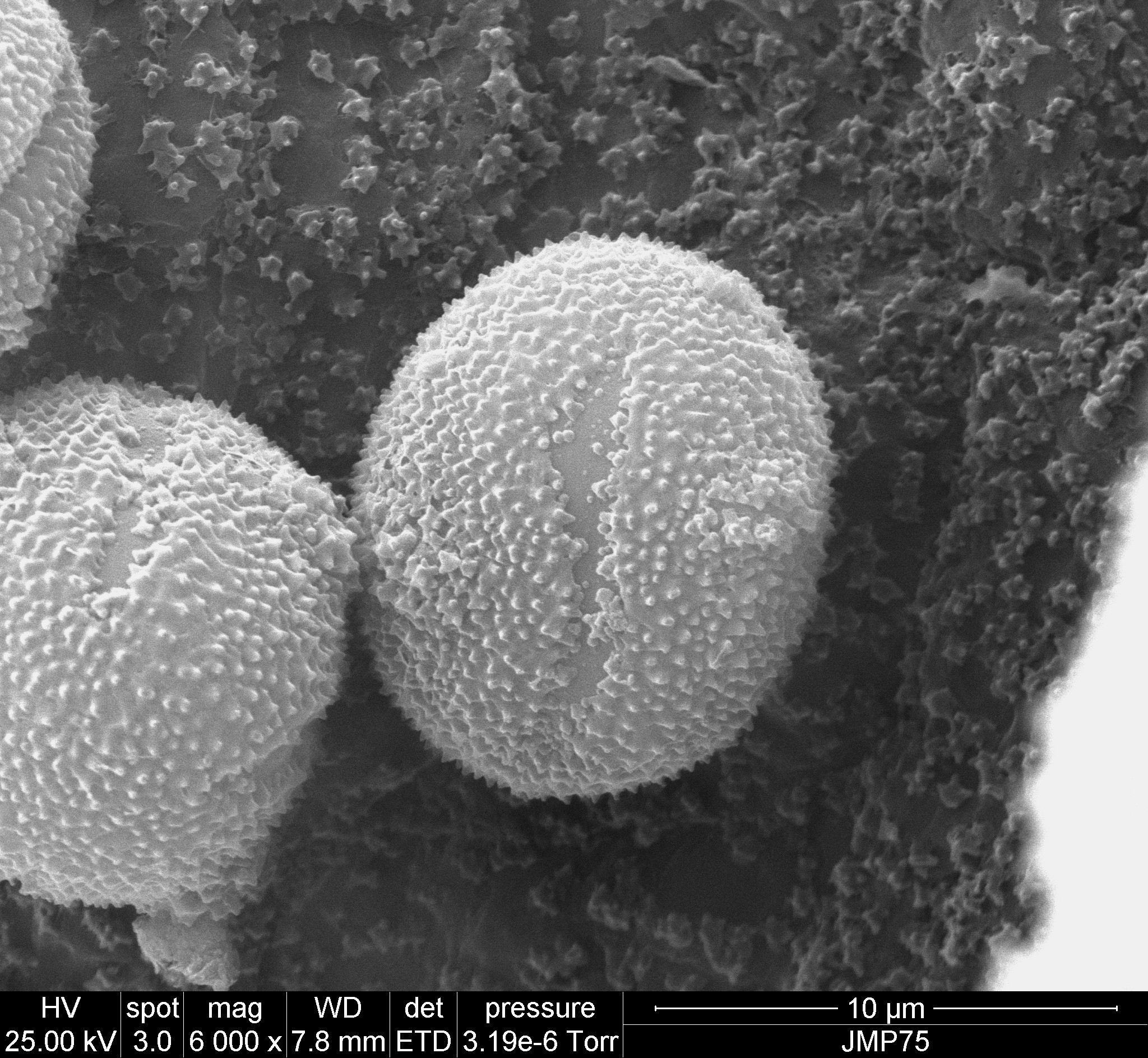
Pollen grain

== Distribution and habitat ==
Myosotis antarctica subsp. traillii is a forget-me-not native to New Zealand from 0–250(–1500) m ASL. It is found in the following islands and ecological districts: North Island (Auckland, Taranaki, Southern North Island), South Island (Western Nelson, Canterbury, Otago, Southland) and Stewart Island (Rakiura). M. antarctica subsp. traillii is found in mostly coastal habitats, including turfs, sand dunes, fellfields, terraces, and rocks.

== Conservation status ==
The subspecies M. antarctica subsp. traillii was previously listed as M. pygmaea in the most recent assessment (2017-2018) of the New Zealand Threatened Classification for plants as At Risk - Declining with qualifier "Sp" (Sparse).
