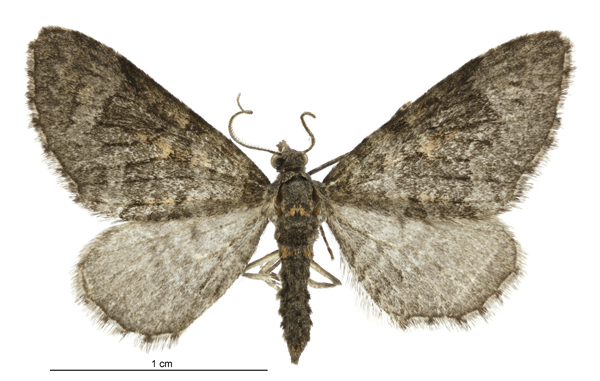
- Male

Scientific classification
- Kingdom: Animalia
- Phylum: Arthropoda
- Class: Insecta
- Order: Lepidoptera
- Family: Geometridae
- Genus: Pasiphila
- Species: P. nebulosa

Binomial name
- Pasiphila nebulosa Dugdale, 1971

= Pasiphila nebulosa =

Species of moth endemic to New Zealand

Pasiphila nebulosa is a moth of the family Geometridae. This species was first described by John S. Dugdale in 1971. It is endemic to New Zealand and is found in the Auckland Islands. This species lives in lowland habitat and the larval host plants are species in the genus Veronica. Adults are nocturnal and are on the wing in December and January.

== Taxonomy ==
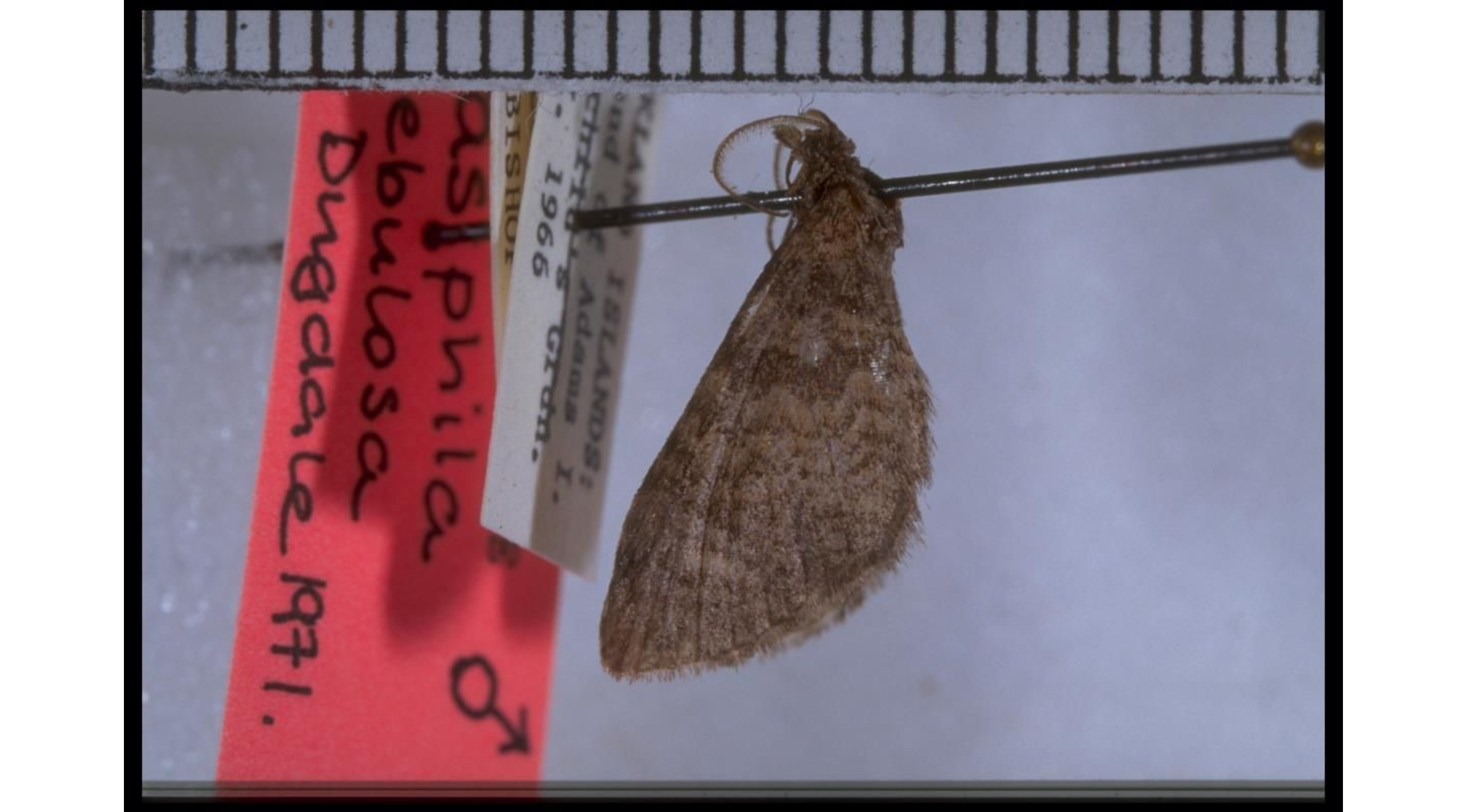
Holotype of P. nebulosa.

This species was first described by John S. Dugdale in 1971 using specimens collected from the Auckland Islands. The male holotype, collected by Keith Wise on Adams Island, is held at the New Zealand Arthropod Collection.

== Description ==
The wing expanse of both the male and female of this species ranges from 24 to 28 mm. The ground colour is dark grey however the forewings may be more pale in colour and are sometimes faintly orange. The patterns on the forewings are not well defined.

== Distribution ==
This species is endemic to New Zealand and can only be found in the Auckland Islands.

== Habitat and hosts ==
This species lives in lowland habitat. Larvae have been collected on Veronica species.

== Behaviour ==
P. nebulosa is nocturnal and are attracted to light. Adults are on the wing in December and January.
