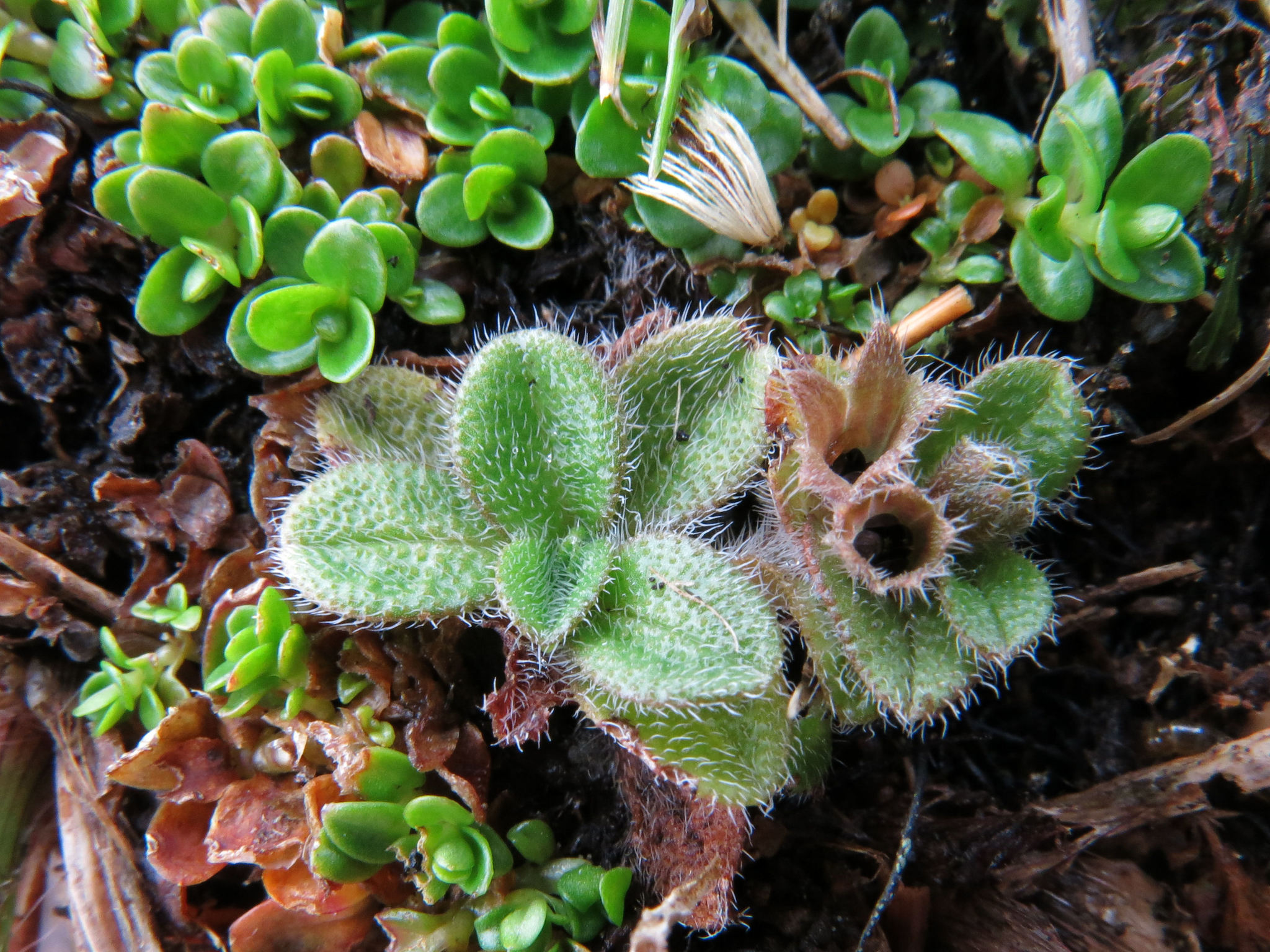

Conservation status
- Naturally Uncommon (NZ TCS)

Scientific classification
- Kingdom: Plantae
- Clade: Tracheophytes
- Clade: Angiosperms
- Clade: Eudicots
- Clade: Asterids
- Order: Boraginales
- Family: Boraginaceae
- Genus: Myosotis
- Species: M. antarctica

Binomial name
- Myosotis antarctica Hook.f.

Synonyms
- Myosotis drucei (L.B.Moore) de Lange & Barkla; Myosotis pygmaea Colenso

= Myosotis antarctica =

Species of flowering plant

Myosotis antarctica is a species of flowering plant in the family Boraginaceae, native to mainland New Zealand, Campbell Island and southern Chile. Joseph Dalton Hooker described the species in his 19th century work Flora Antarctica. Plants of this species of forget-me-not are perennial with a prostrate habit, bracteate inflorescences, and white or blue corollas. It is one of two native species of Myosotis in the New Zealand subantarctic islands, the other being M. capitata, which also has blue corollas.

== Taxonomy and etymology ==
Myosotis antarctica Hook.f. is in the family Boraginaceae and was described in 1844 by Joseph Dalton Hooker from the New Zealand subantarctic islands. After its original description, others expanded the circumscription of M. antarctica to include plants from mainland New Zealand. In 1961, Lucy Moore's treatment in the Flora of New Zealand circumscribed M. antarctica to include only plants from Campbell Island and Chile.

Since then, common usage of the name M. antarctica has largely followed Moore's treatment, and morphologically similar mainland plants have been referred to as M. drucei, M. pygmaea, M. glauca and M. brevis. These species constitute the "pygmy subgroup" of New Zealand Myosotis, and the latest taxonomic revision of this subgroup from 2022 recognizes three species: M. antarctica (with two subspecies), M. brevis, and M. glauca. In that treatment, M. antarctica has an expanded circumscription to include plants from Campbell Island and Chile, as well as those from mainland New Zealand previously called M. drucei and M. pygmaea, and two subspecies are recognized.

The two subspecies of M. antarctica are M. antarctica subsp. antarctica (previously M. antarctica and M. drucei) and M. antarctica subsp. traillii (previously M. pygmaea). The subspecies are largely allopatric, and can be distinguished from one another based on the hairs on the rosette leaves.

The type specimen of Myosotis antarctica was collected by Joseph Hooker on Campbell Island and is lodged at Kew Herbarium.

The specific epithet, antarctica, derives from its presence on the New Zealand subantarctic islands.

== Phylogeny ==
Myosotis antarctica was shown to be a part of the monophyletic southern hemisphere lineage of Myosotis in phylogenetic analyses of standard DNA sequencing markers (nuclear ribosomal DNA and chloroplast DNA regions). Within the southern hemisphere lineage, species relationships were not well resolved. The sequences of M. antarctica (including some referred to as M. pygmaea and M. drucei) grouped with other New Zealand species that are morphologically similar to it, including M. brevis.

== Description ==
Myosotis antarctica plants are single rosettes. The rosette leaves have petioles 1–20 mm long. The rosette leaf blades are 3–26 mm long by 1–11 mm wide (length: width ratio usually 1.0–4.0: 1), narrowly oblanceolate to very broadly obovate, widest at or above the middle, green or brown, with an obtuse apex. The upper surface of the leaf is densely covered in curved or flexuous, patent to erect, evenly-distributed antrorse (forward-facing) hairs, whereas the lower surface of the leaf is similar but with fewer hairs (ranging from glabrous to with sparsely distributed hairs). The hairs on the leaf edges are appressed to spreading. Each rosette has multiple prostrate, bracteate inflorescences that are usually up to 15 cm long (rarely up to 31 cm long). The cauline leaves are similar in size and shape to the rosette leaves and usually sessile. Each inflorescence has up to 46 flowers, each borne on a very short pedicel, with a bract. The calyx is 1–4 mm long at flowering and 2–7 mm long at fruiting, lobed to one-third to three-quarters its length, and hairs that are sometimes of two different lengths and types. The corolla is white, cream, or blue, up to 4 mm in diameter, with a cylindrical tube, and small yellow scales alternating with the petals. The anthers are very short (usually < 0.3 mm long) and fully included. The four smooth, shiny nutlets are usually 1.2–1.9 mm long by 0.8–1.2 mm wide and are ovoid in shape.

The chromosome number of M. antarctica is unknown.

The pollen of M. antarctica is australis type pollen.

It flowers August–April and fruits September–April, with peak flowering and fruiting December–January.

== Distribution and habitat ==
Myosotis antarctica is a forget-me-not native to New Zealand, Campbell Island, and southern Chile (Magallanes) from 0–2200 m ASL. In mainland New Zealand, it is found in the following islands and ecological districts: North Island (Auckland, Taranaki, Gisborne, Volcanic Plateau, Southern North Island), South Island (Western Nelson, Sounds-Nelson, Marlborough, Westland, Canterbury, Otago, Southland, Fiordland) and Stewart Island (Rakiura). M. antarctica is found in habitats ranging from coastal to subalpine, including on turfs, dunes, fellfields, scree, cliff faces, and terraces.

== Conservation status ==
M. antarctica was listed as At Risk - Naturally Uncommon on the most recent assessment (2017-2018) of the New Zealand Threatened Classification for plants. It also has the qualifiers "DP" (Data Poor), "Sp" (Sparse) and "TO" (Threatened Overseas). This assessment was based on a narrow circumscription of M. antarctica which included the Campbell Island populations only. As to the other two species now included in a larger circumscription of M. antarctica, M. drucei was listed as Not Threatened and M. pygmaea was listed as At Risk - Declining with the qualifier "Sp" (Sparse) in the same publication.

== Gallery ==
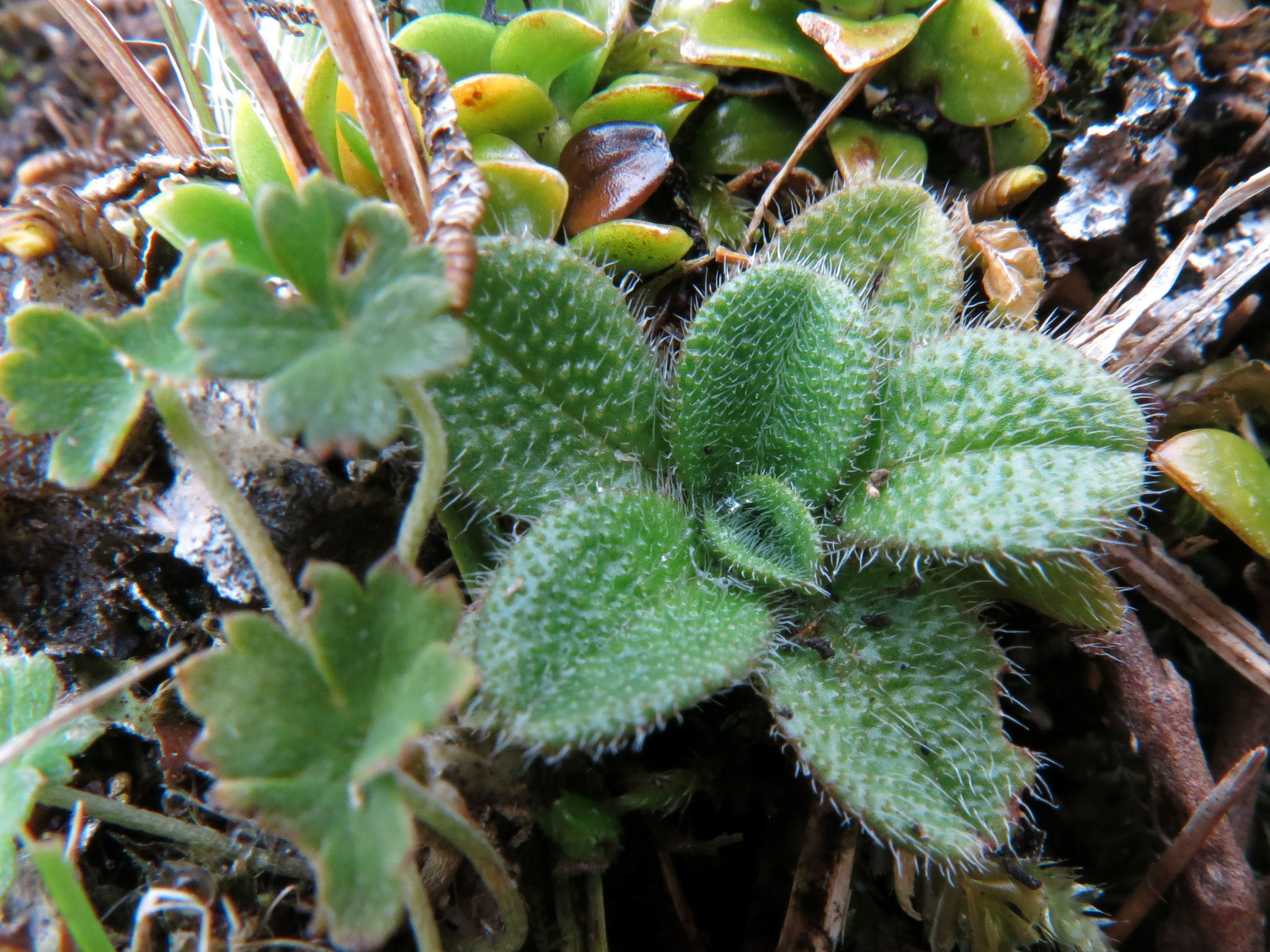

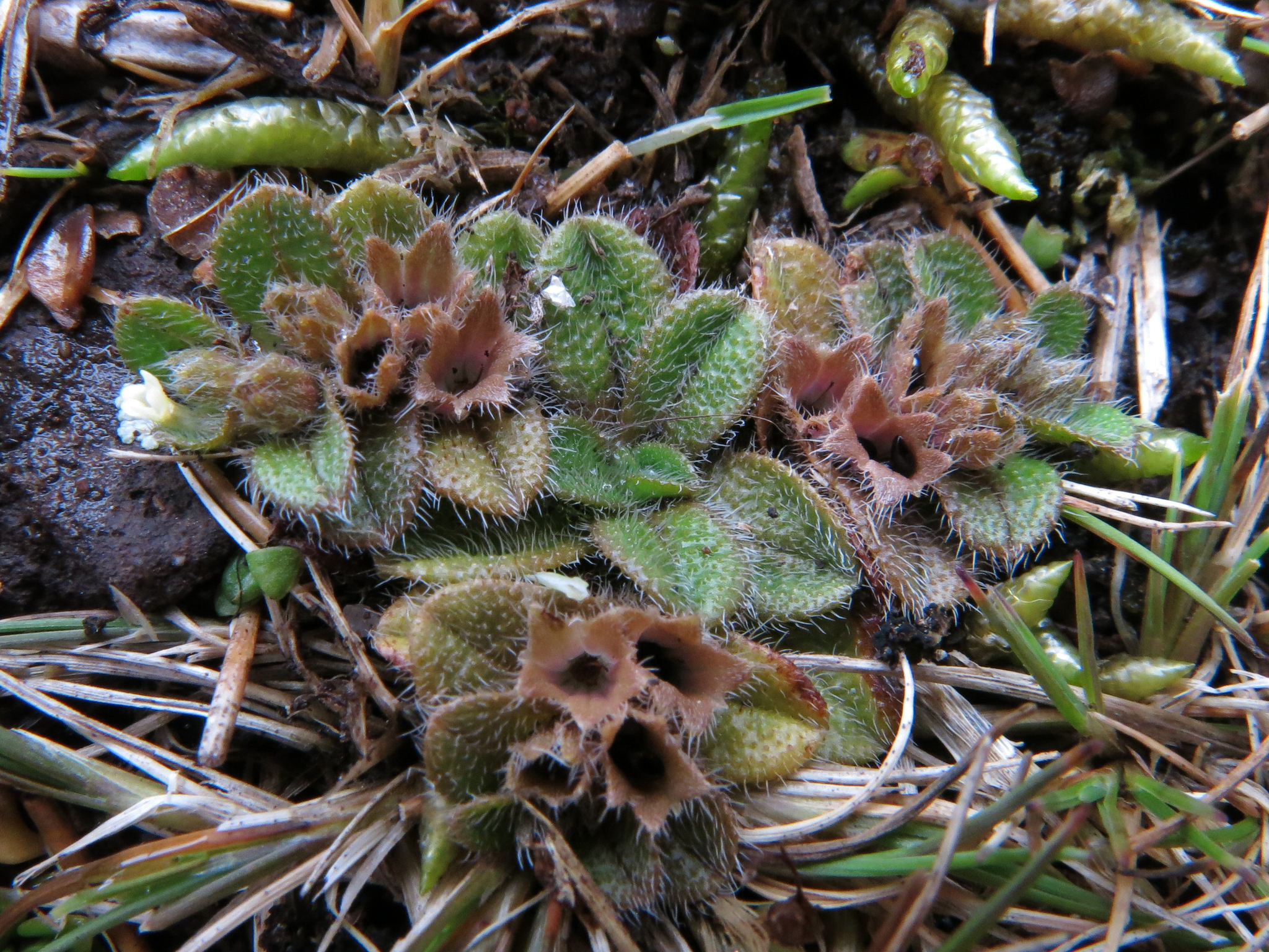

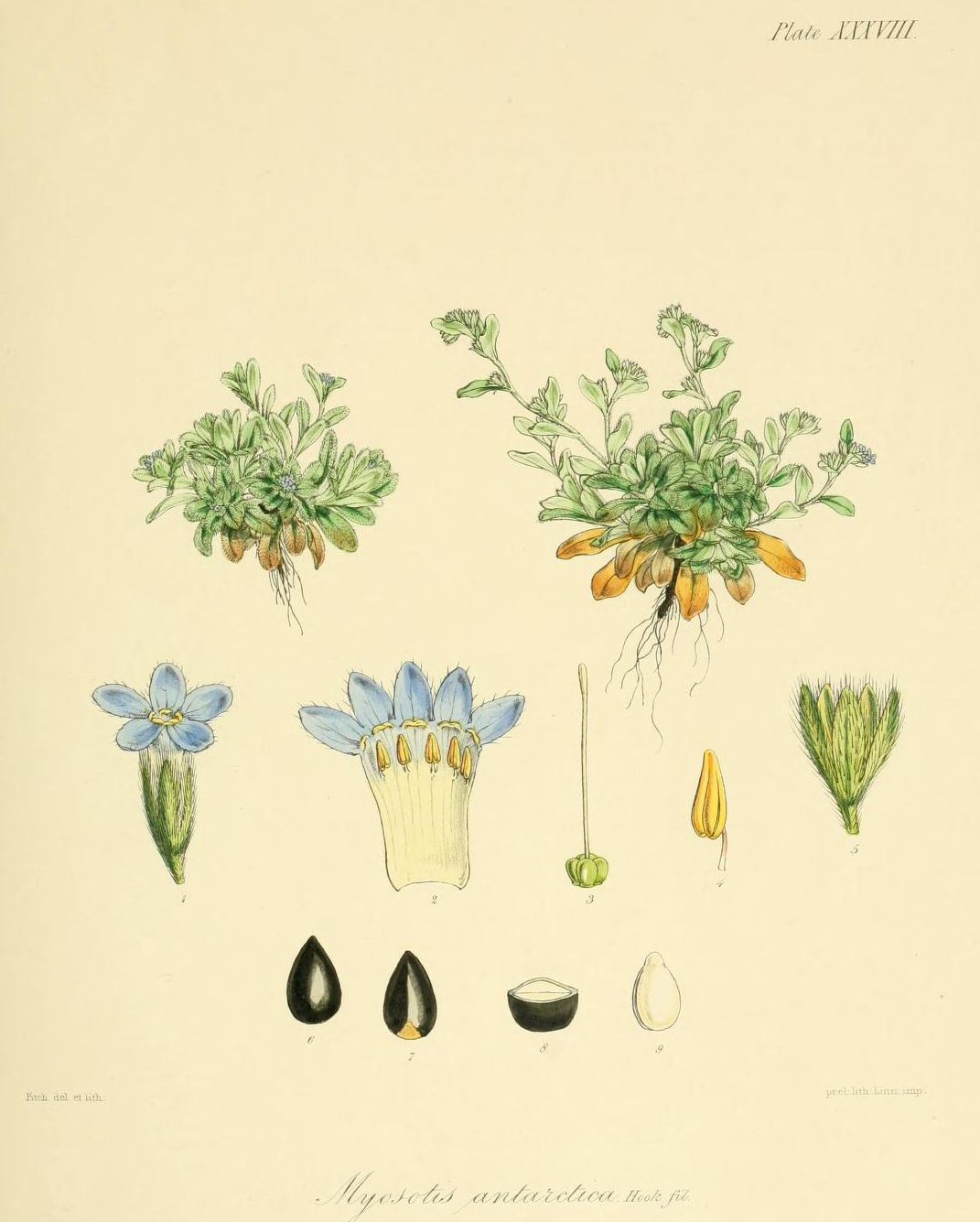
Plate XXXVIII of Hooker's Flora Antarctica.
