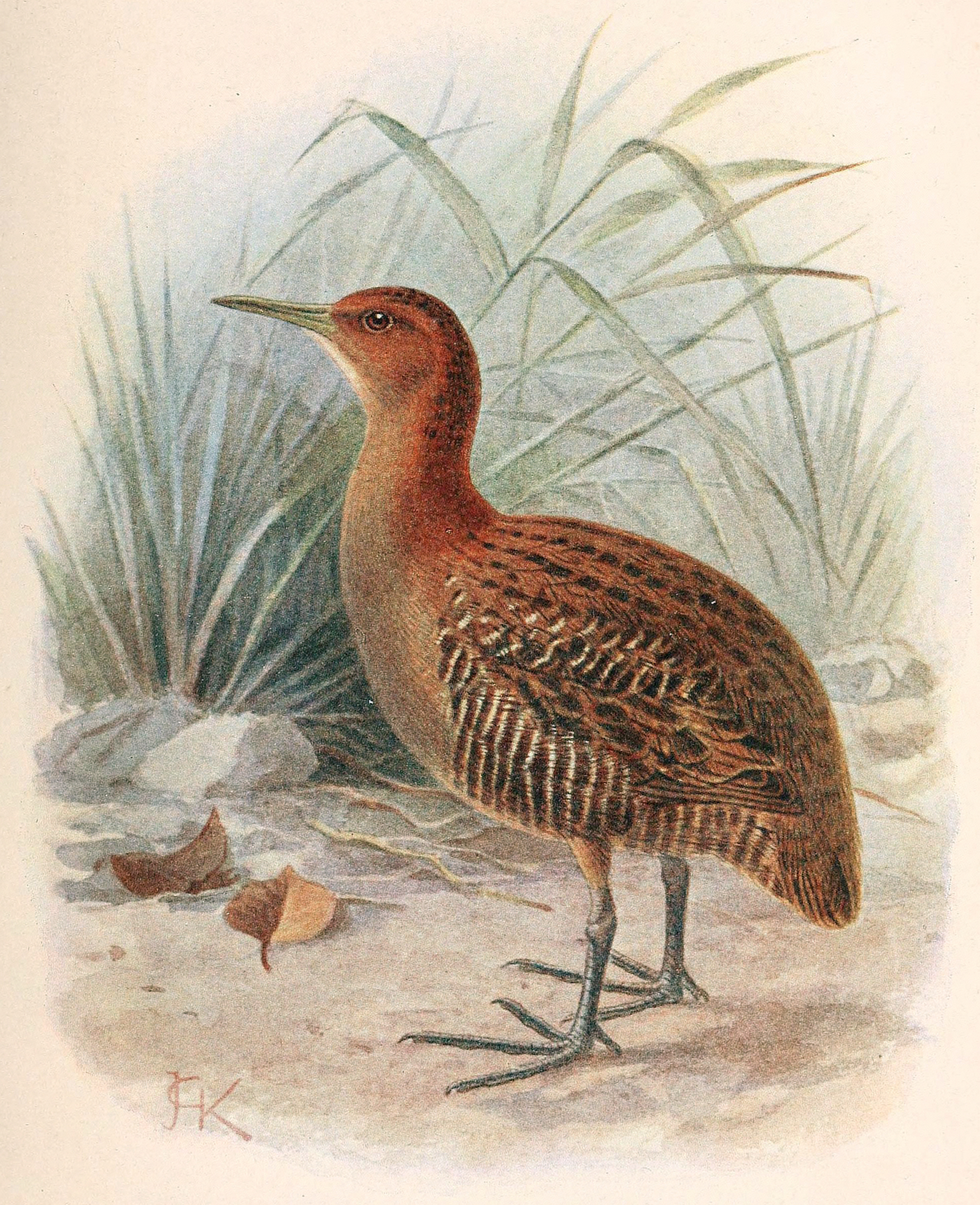
- Illustration by John Gerrard Keulemans, 1905

Conservation status
- Vulnerable (IUCN 3.1)

Scientific classification
- Kingdom: Animalia
- Phylum: Chordata
- Class: Aves
- Order: Gruiformes
- Family: Rallidae
- Genus: Lewinia
- Species: L. muelleri

Binomial name
- Lewinia muelleri (Rothschild, 1893)
- Distribution area

= Auckland rail =

Species of bird

The Auckland rail, also known as the Auckland Island rail or Auckland Islands rail (Lewinia muelleri) is a small nearly flightless rail endemic to the Auckland Islands 460 km south of New Zealand. Its closest relative is Lewin's rail of Australia. The species is currently restricted to two islands in the Auckland islands group, Adams Island and Disappointment Island.

== Taxonomy ==
The Auckland rail is sometimes placed in the genus Dryolimnas. It is monotypic. Its closest relative is the Lewin's rail.

== Description ==
The sexes are similar, the females are possibly duller however. A small rail, the Auckland rail measures 17–20 cm (6.7–7.9 in) in length, and four adults were found to weigh 89–100 g (3.1–3.5 oz). Its head and neck are reddish-brown in colour, while it has a grey breast and a brown-black coloured back.

Its characteristic call is a loud "kek" or "crek" sound, but it can also make a variety of quieter calls, as well as grunts and clicks.

The Auckland rail can fly but only does so very rarely.

== Behaviour ==
Its diet and foraging methods probably very similar to the Lewin's rail, and it probably feeds mainly on invertebrates.

The Auckland rail is active during daylight but may also be active for some time after sunset. It appears to be territorial.

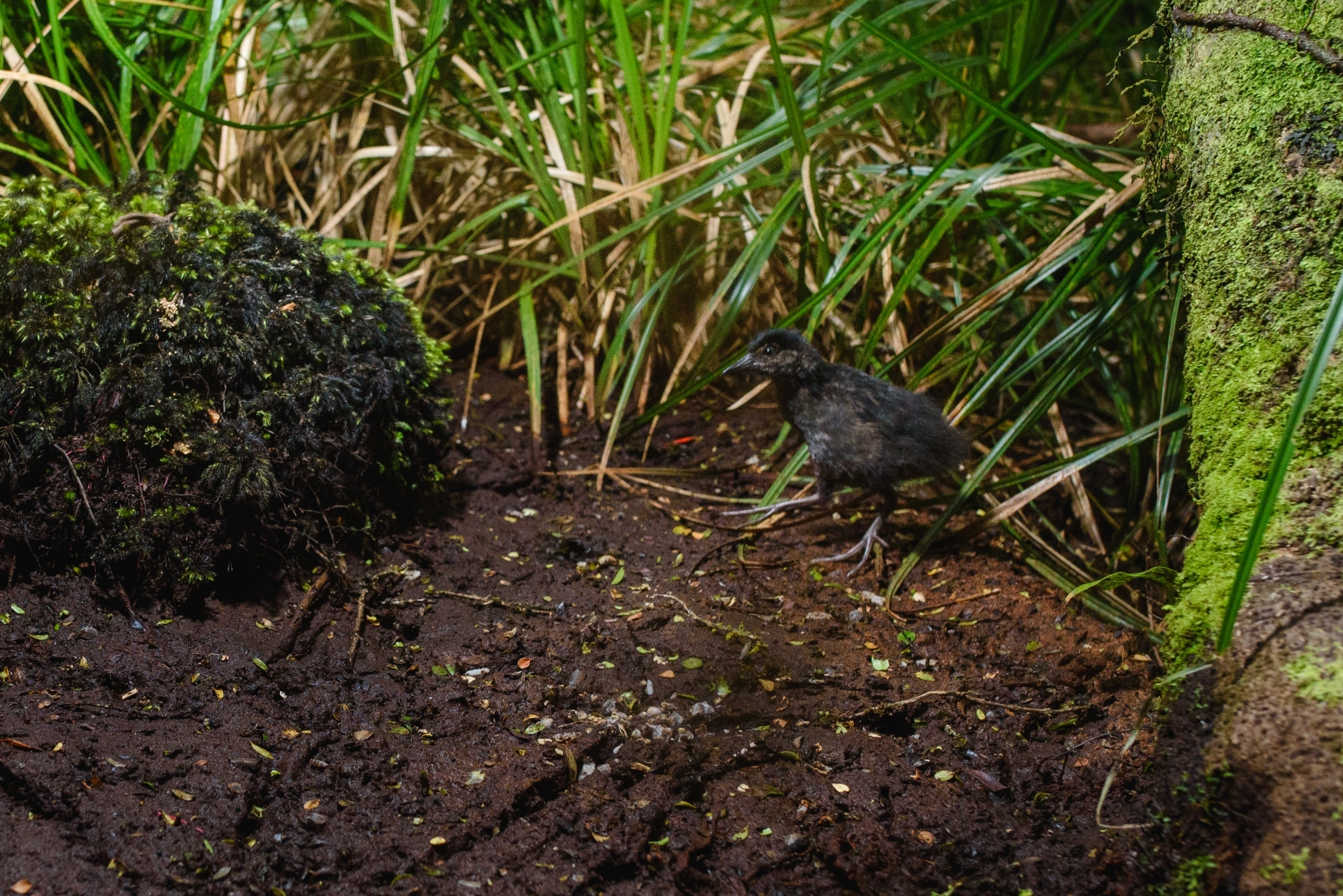
Auckland rail chick, taken with trail camera on Adams Island in 2024.

It is probably monogamous. One active nest of the Auckland rail was found in November, containing two eggs. The nest is woven of grass and/or sedges. Its incubation period is probably similar to Lewin's rail, which incubates for 19–20 days. Its eggs are cream coloured with brown, red-brown and pale grey spots and blotches. The eggs measure 34 mm × 25 mm (1.34 in × 0.98 in), on average.

== Conservation ==
The Auckland rail is highly secretive and was considered to be extinct after its last sighting in 1893, before being rediscovered on Adams Island in 1966, and Disappointment island in 1993. As of 2022, the population is believed to be stable and is estimated at 2,000 mature individuals between these two islands. It is thought to have become extinct on the main Auckland Island due to the presence of introduced feral cats and pigs. The species is currently considered Vulnerable by the IUCN and BirdLife International due to its restricted range and threat of rapid extinction if invasive mammals were to be introduced.
