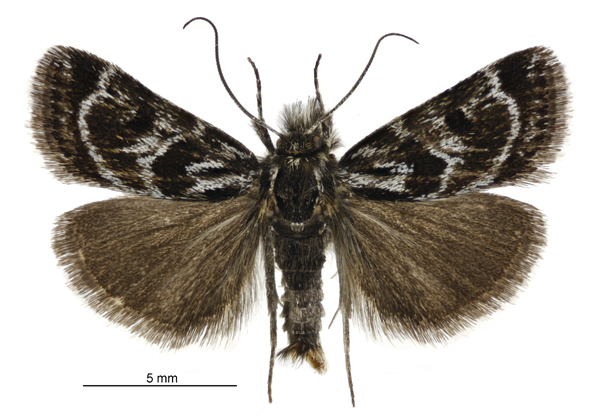
- Male
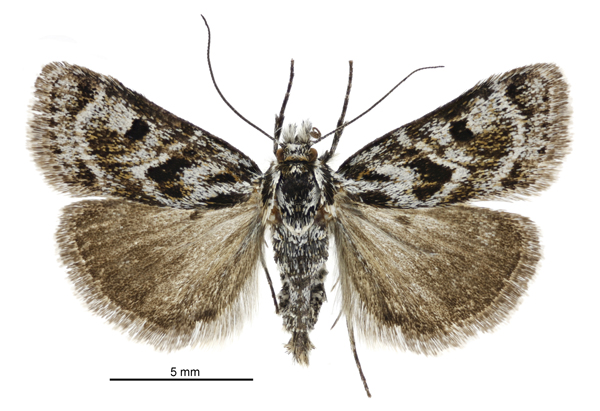
- Female

Scientific classification
- Kingdom: Animalia
- Phylum: Arthropoda
- Clade: Pancrustacea
- Class: Insecta
- Order: Lepidoptera
- Family: Crambidae
- Genus: Tauroscopa
- Species: T. trapezitis

Binomial name
- Tauroscopa trapezitis Meyrick, 1905

= Tauroscopa trapezitis =

Species of moth endemic to New Zealand

Tauroscopa trapezitis, the chequered alpine snout, is a moth in the family Crambidae. It was first described by Edward Meyrick in 1905. It is endemic to New Zealand and is found only in the South Island from Arthur's Pass south. This species frequents alpine habitat. Adults are on the wing from November to January and is day flying. As at 2017 the larval host is unknown.

== Taxonomy ==
This species was first described by Edward Meyrick in 1905 using as specimen collected by George Hudson on Mount Earnslaw at 5,300 feet (1,600 m). George Hudson discussed and illustrated this species in his 1928 book The butterflies and moths of New Zealand. In 1929 Alfred Philpott discussed the male genitalia of this species. In 1973, in his revision of New Zealand Chilonini, David E. Gaskin redescribed this species. The male holotype is held at the Natural History Museum, London.

== Description ==
Live moth.

Illustration of male by Hudson.

Meyrick originally described the male adult of this species as follows:

♂. 22 mm. Head and thorax blackish-fuscous mixed with white, orbits and cheeks naked, orange. Palpi dark fuscous, white on upper longitudinal half and at base beneath. Antennae blackish, towards base whitish-sprinkled. Abdomen bronzy-fuscous sprinkled with white. Fore-wings elongate-triangular, costa faintly sinuate, apex rounded, termen rather obliquely rounded ; grey, partially slightly ochreous-tinged, densely and suffusedly mixed with whitish; markings blackish, somewhat irregular-edged ; a streak along basal third of dorsum, and a streak from base of costa equal and parallel to this ; two small costal spots before and one beyond middle ; an oblique narrow-trapezoidal spot in disc before middle, its posterior edge formed by whitish first line, which is very acutely angulated below middle; a reniform discal spot slightly beyond middle ; second line whitish, obtusely angulated in middle and indented beneath costa, edged with black anteriorly and by an oblique black spot on costa posteriorly ; a terminal series of small black spots: cilia grey, with dark grey basal shade, tips white. Hind-wings rather dark grey ; cilia grey, mixed with white towards tips.

Both the male and female have a wing span that ranges from 18 to 22 mm. Although similar in appearance to its sister species Tauroscopa gorgopis, T. trapezitis is very distinct, especially as a result of the peculiarly formed first line on the forewings and the unique lack of hair-like scales on the orange cheeks and eyes of the moth. T. trapezitis is variable in appearance but only in the forewing colour and patterns.

== Distribution ==
T. trapezitis is endemic to New Zealand. This species is found in the South Island from Arthur's Pass south. Flight period November to JanuaryHudson regarded this species as rare.

== Habitat and hosts ==
The species frequents alpine habitat. As at 2017 the larval host of T. trapezitis is unknown.

== Behaviour ==
Adults are on the wing from November to January and is day flying.
