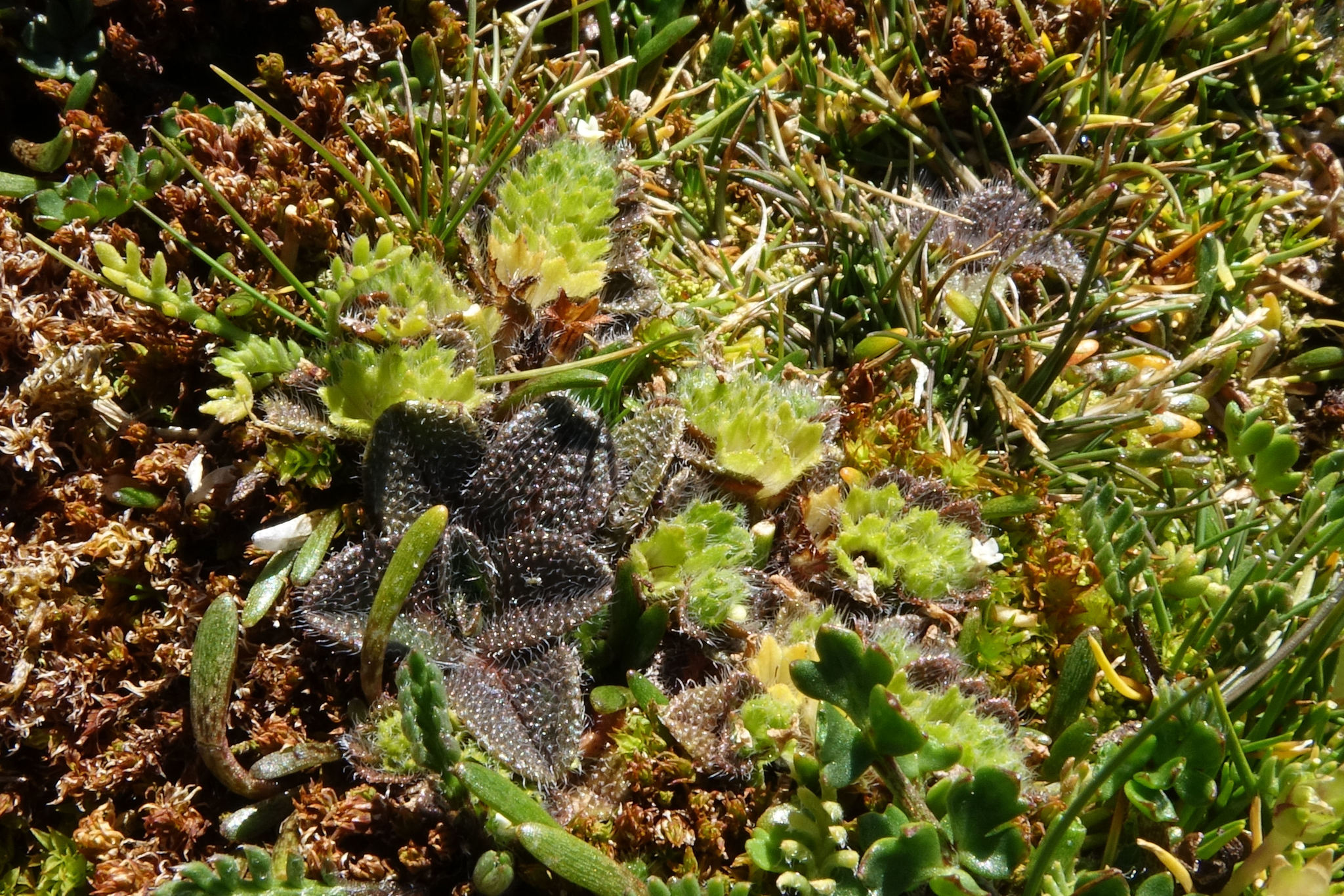

Conservation status
- Naturally Uncommon (NZ TCS)

Scientific classification
- Kingdom: Plantae
- Clade: Tracheophytes
- Clade: Angiosperms
- Clade: Eudicots
- Clade: Asterids
- Order: Boraginales
- Family: Boraginaceae
- Genus: Myosotis
- Species: M. antarctica
- Subspecies: M. a. subsp. antarctica

Trinomial name
- Myosotis antarctica subsp. antarctica Hook.f.

Synonyms
- Myosotis drucei (L.B.Moore) de Lange & Barkla; Myosotis pygmaea var. drucei L.B.Moore

= Myosotis antarctica subsp. antarctica =

Subspecies of flowering plant

Myosotis antarctica subsp. antarctica is a subspecies of flowering plant in the family Boraginaceae, native to New Zealand, Campbell Island, and southern Chile. Joseph Dalton Hooker described the species in his 19th century work Flora Antarctica. Plants of this subspecies of forget-me-not are perennial with a prostrate habit, bracteate inflorescences, and white or blue corollas. It is one of two native Myosotis in the New Zealand subantarctic islands, the other being M. capitata, which also has blue corollas.

== Taxonomy and etymology ==
Myosotis antarctica Hook.f. subsp antarctica is in the family Boraginaceae. Myosotis antarctica was described in 1844 by Joseph Dalton Hooker from the New Zealand subantarctic islands. Botanists' circumscription of Myosotis antarctica has changed over time, sometimes referring only to plants from Campbell Island and Chile., or also including plants from mainland New Zealand.

The latest taxonomic revision of recognizes an expanded M. antarctica which includes plants from mainland New Zealand, Campbell Island and Chile, including those previously called M. drucei and M. pygmaea. The two allopatric subspecies of M. antarctica are M. antarctica subsp. antarctica (previously M. antarctica from Campbell Island and Chile, and M. drucei from mainland New Zealand) and M. antarctica subsp. traillii (previously M. pygmaea from mainland New Zealand).

Myosotis antarctica subsp. antarctica can be distinguished from M. antarctica subsp. traillii by its flexuous, spreading to erect hairs on the blade and edges of the rosette leaves. Plants of subsp. antarctica are usually found at inland localities on mainland New Zealand, but can be coastal in Fiordland, Campbell Island and Chile. By contrast, M. antarctica subsp. traillii has curved, appressed to spreading hairs on the blade and edges of the rosette leaves. Plants of subsp. traillii are usually found on coastal localities in mainland New Zealand.

The type specimen of Myosotis antarctica was collected by Joseph Hooker on Campbell Island and is lodged at Kew Herbarium.

The specific epithet, antarctica, derives from its presence on the New Zealand subantarctic islands.

== Phylogeny ==
Myosotis antarctica was shown to be a part of the monophyletic southern hemisphere lineage of Myosotis in phylogenetic analyses of standard DNA sequencing markers (nuclear ribosomal DNA and chloroplast DNA regions). Within the southern hemisphere lineage, species relationships were not well resolved. Sequences of both subspecies of M. antarctica (including some referred to as M. pygmaea and M. drucei) grouped with other New Zealand species that are morphologically similar, including M. brevis.

== Description ==
Myosotis antarctica subsp. antarctica plants are single rosettes. The rosette leaves have petioles 1–20 mm long. The rosette leaf blades are 3–26 mm long by 1–11 mm wide (length: width ratio usually 1.0–4.0: 1), narrowly oblanceolate to very broadly obovate, widest at or above the middle, green or brown, with an obtuse apex. The upper surface of the leaf is densely covered in flexuous, patent to erect, evenly-distributed antrorse (forward-facing) hairs, whereas the lower surface of the leaf is similar but with fewer hairs (ranging from glabrous to with sparsely distributed hairs). The hairs on the leaf edges are spreading to erect. Each rosette has multiple prostrate, bracteate inflorescences that are usually up to 15 cm long (rarely up to 31 cm long). The cauline leaves are similar in size and shape to the rosette leaves and usually sessile. Each inflorescence has up to 46 flowers, each borne on a very short pedicel, with a bract. The calyx is 1–4 mm long at flowering and 2–7 mm long at fruiting, lobed to one-third to three-quarters its length, and hairs that are sometimes of two different lengths and types. The corolla is white, cream, or blue, up to 4 mm in diameter, with a cylindrical tube, and small yellow scales alternating with the petals. The anthers are very short (usually < 0.3 mm long) and fully included. The four smooth, shiny nutlets are usually 1.2–1.9 mm long by 0.8–1.2 mm wide and are ovoid in shape.

The chromosome number of M. antarctica subsp. antarctica is n = 24 (CHR 101449, as Myosotis pygmaea s.l.) or n = 22 (AK 331000, as M. aff. drucei).

It flowers August–April and fruits September–April, with peak flowering and fruiting December–January.

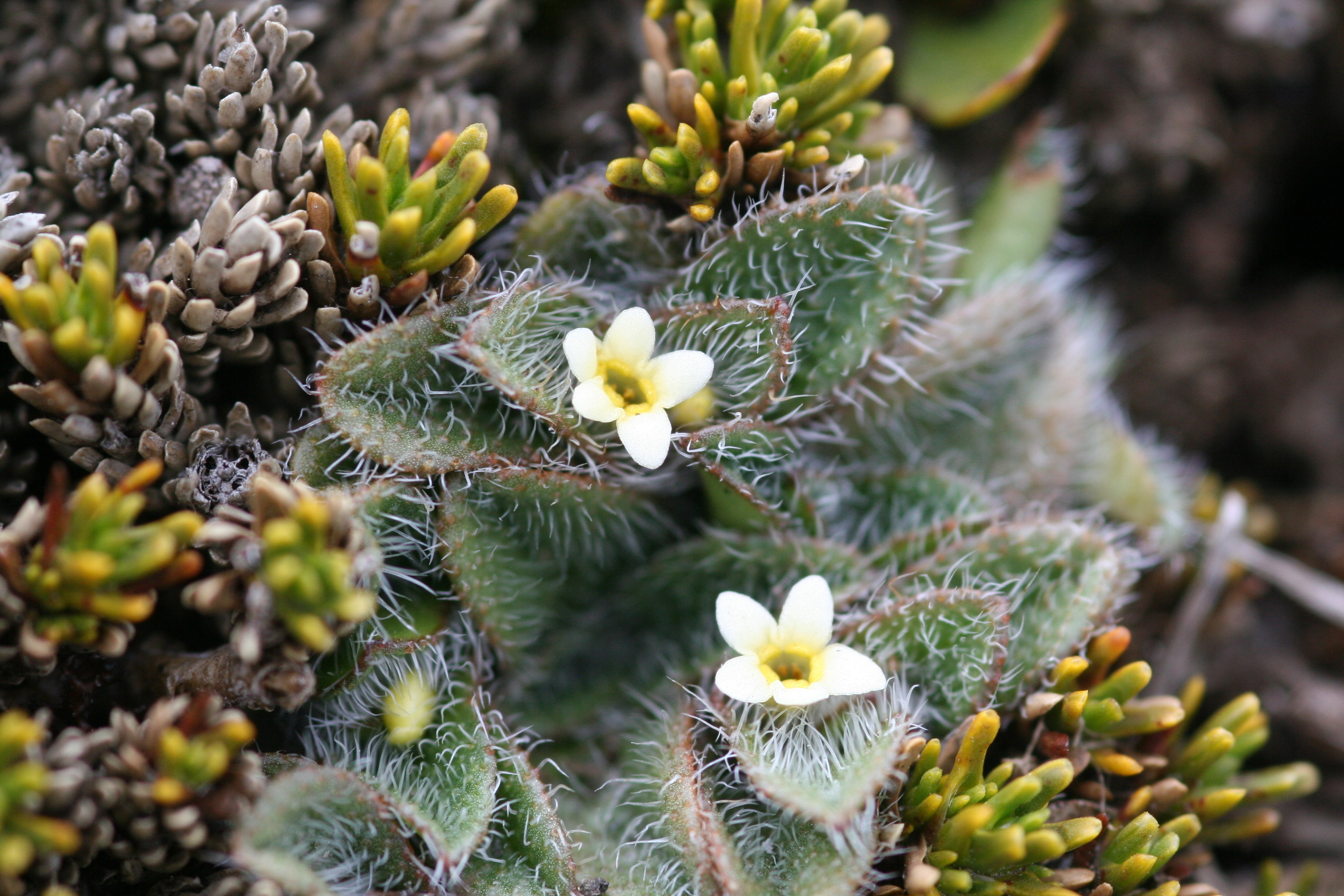
Floral detail

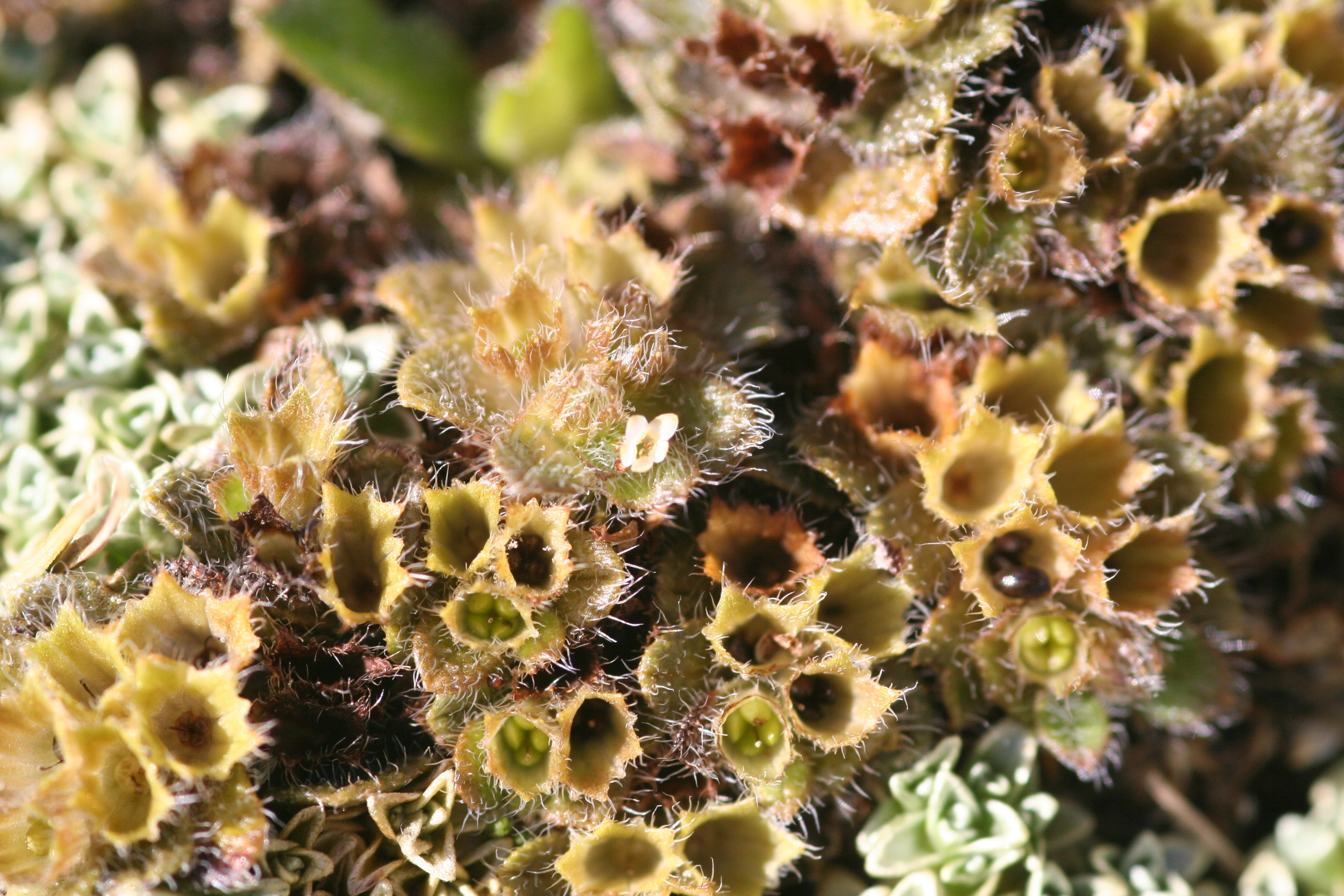
Close up of fruits

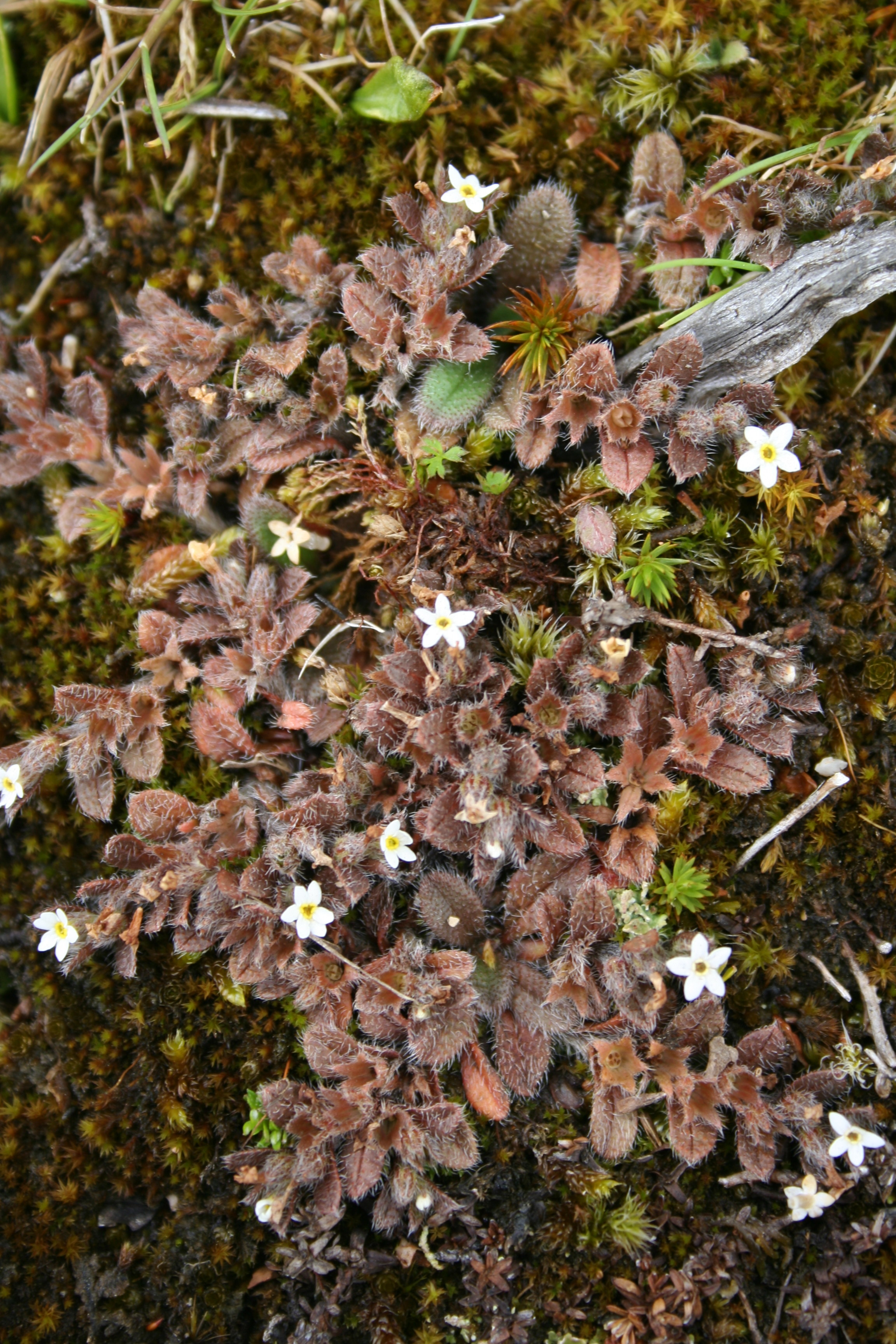
Growth habit

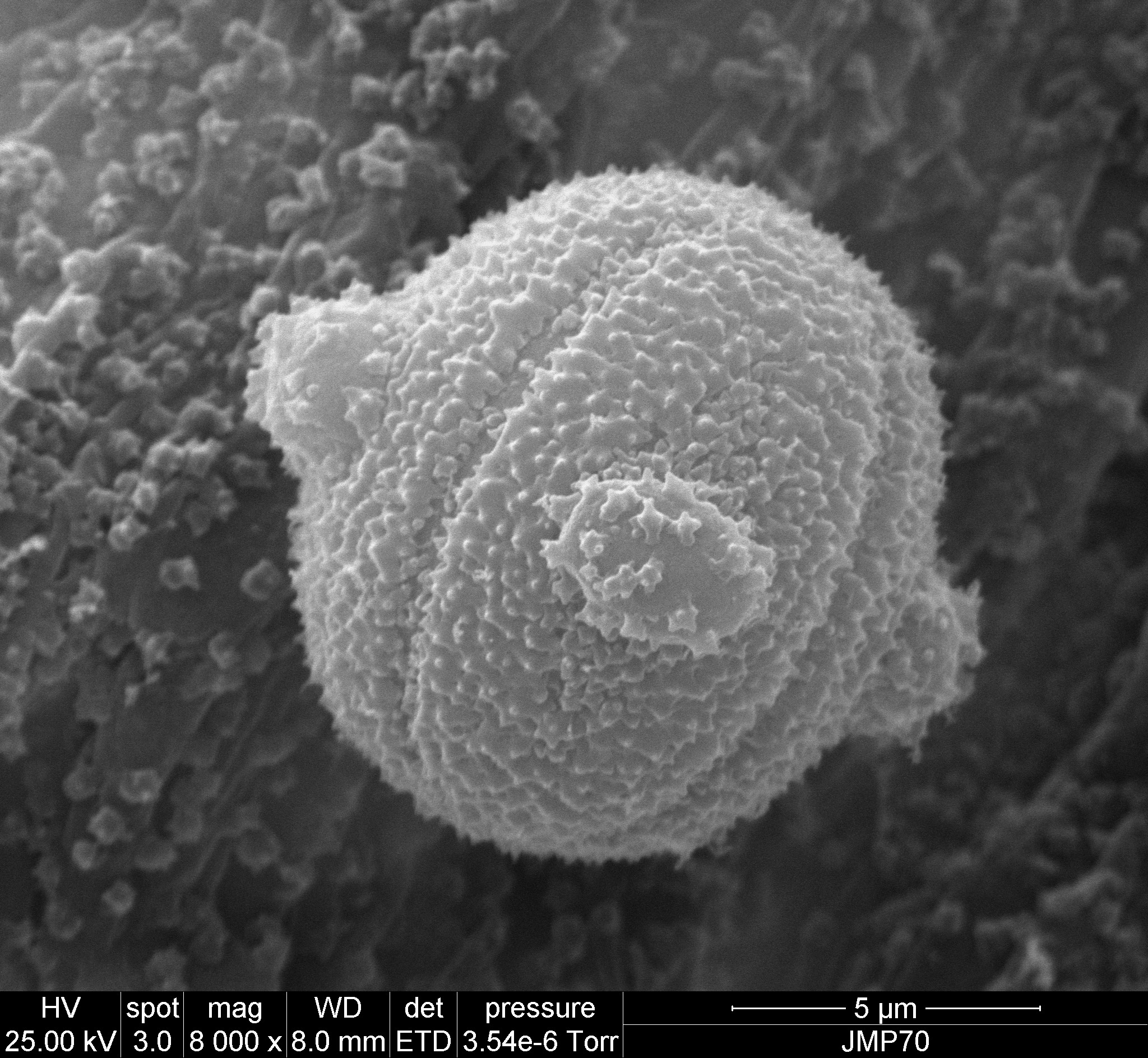
Pollen grain

== Distribution and habitat ==
Myosotis antarctica subsp. antarctica is a forget-me-not native to New Zealand, Campbell Island, and southern Chile (Magallanes) from 0–2200 m ASL. Very few collections of this subspecies have been made from Chile, with the most recent being from "Punta Arenas" by Per Dusén in 1895 and from "Puerto Altamirano" by Carl Skottsberg in 1908.

In mainland New Zealand, it is found in the following islands and ecological districts: North Island (Gisborne, Volcanic Plateau, Southern North Island), South Island (Western Nelson, Sounds-Nelson, Marlborough, Westland, Canterbury, Otago, Southland, Fiordland) and Stewart Island (Rakiura). M. antarctica subsp. antarctica is found in habitats ranging from coastal to subalpine, including on turfs, fellfields, scree, and cliff faces.

== Conservation status ==
The subspecies M. antarctica subsp. antarctica was previously listed as two different species in the most recent assessment (2017-2018) of the New Zealand Threatened Classification for plants. Thus, M. antarctica (=Campbell Island populations only) was listed as At Risk - Naturally Uncommon with qualifiers "DP" (Data Poor), "Sp" (Sparse) and "TO" (Threatened Overseas), whereas M. drucei (mainland New Zealand) was listed as Not Threatened.
