= Brown-banded rail =

Conservation status
- Data Deficient (IUCN 3.1)

Scientific classification
- Kingdom: Animalia
- Phylum: Chordata
- Class: Aves
- Order: Gruiformes
- Family: Rallidae
- Genus: Lewinia
- Species: L. mirifica

Binomial name
- Lewinia mirifica (Parkes & Amadon, 1959)

Synonyms
- Lewinia mirificus (Parkes & Amadon, 1959) [orthographic error] Rallus mirificus mirificus Collar & Andrew, 1988)

Species of bird

The brown-banded rail (Lewinia mirifica), also known as the Luzon rail, is a species of bird in the family Rallidae. It is endemic to the Philippines found on the island of Luzon. Details about its life and breeding are not known. Its habitat is listed to be cloudforest, near pine forest and undisturbed river swamp and is found at 500–2,250 meters. It is largely known from migration records of 200 sightings from 1965 to 1970 at Dalton Pass so it is thought to be migratory. Its call is described as "frog-like accelerating series of clicking notes". The threats are not exactly known but it has been and is continuing to be hunted at Dalton Pass.

== Description and taxonomy ==
The brown-banded rail is 20–23 cm (7.9–9.1 in) in length.

This species is monotypic.

== Ecology and behavior ==
Nothing is directly known about this bird as it is mostly observed when it is trapped or mist netted in Dalton Pass. It is believed to have the same feeding habits as Lewin's rail which feeds on earthworms, arthorpods, frogs and some vegetable matter.

== Habitat and conservation status ==
Its precise habitat is unknown but is typically recorded in wet grassy areas. Most records are of migrating birds passing through Dalton Pass at 1,000 meters above sea level but records up to 2,690 have also been found.

IUCN has assessed this bird as Data deficient but was formerly listed as Endangered; its true range is still unknown. This bird is caught by trappers along with various other rails and migratory birds.

This species was not officially recorded for more than a decade from 2014 leading it to be declared as a lost bird in 2024. However, a research team found a dead specimen in 2026. Upon interviews with locals, they were able to find photos of a caputred and live individual in 2025.
