= Mount Dick =

Highest point of the Auckland Islands

Coordinates: 50°52′55.82″S 166°04′46.15″E

Mount Dick is a 705-metre (2313 ft) peak on Adams Island, the second-largest of New Zealand's Auckland Island chain. It is the highest point in the Auckland Islands. Mount Dick is on the rim of an extinct volcano, the crater of which now forms Carnley Harbour, which separates Adams Island from the larger Auckland Island.

This mountain was named after Richard “Dickey” Sayers, who moved from Wellington with his family to the Wairarapa in 1859.
