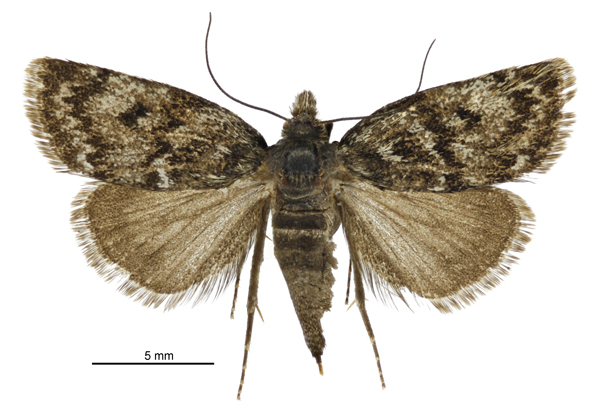
- Female
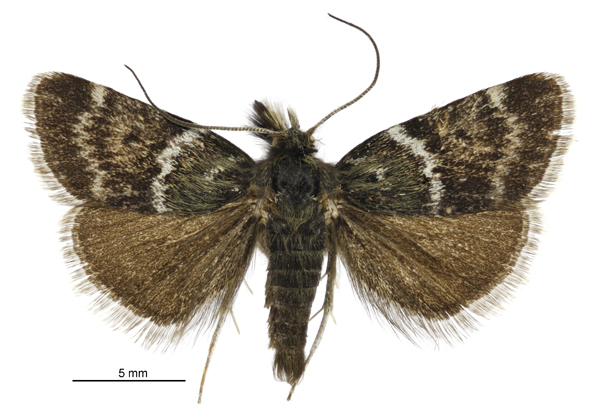
- Male

Scientific classification
- Kingdom: Animalia
- Phylum: Arthropoda
- Class: Insecta
- Order: Lepidoptera
- Family: Crambidae
- Subfamily: Crambinae
- Tribe: Chiloini
- Genus: Tauroscopa
- Species: T. gorgopis

Binomial name
- Tauroscopa gorgopis Meyrick, 1888

Synonyms
- Tauroscopa howesi Philpott, 1928

= Tauroscopa gorgopis =

Species of moth endemic to New Zealand

Tauroscopa gorgopis is a moth in the family Crambidae. It was first described by Edward Meyrick in 1888. This species is endemic to New Zealand and is found in the South Island. It inhabits rocky places on high mountains and is a day flying moth. Adults are variable in appearance and are commonly observed from December until February.

== Taxonomy ==
This species was first described by Edward Meyrick in 1888 using a specimen collected at Mount Arthur at 4000 ft in January. In 1928 George Hudson discussed and illustrated this species in his book The butterflies and moths of New Zealand. Also in 1928 Alfred Philpott, thinking he was describing a new species, raised the form of this moth found in the Old Man Range to species level and named it Tauroscopa howesi. This species was synonymised by David Edward Gaskin in 1973. The male holotype is held at Natural History Museum, London.

== Description ==
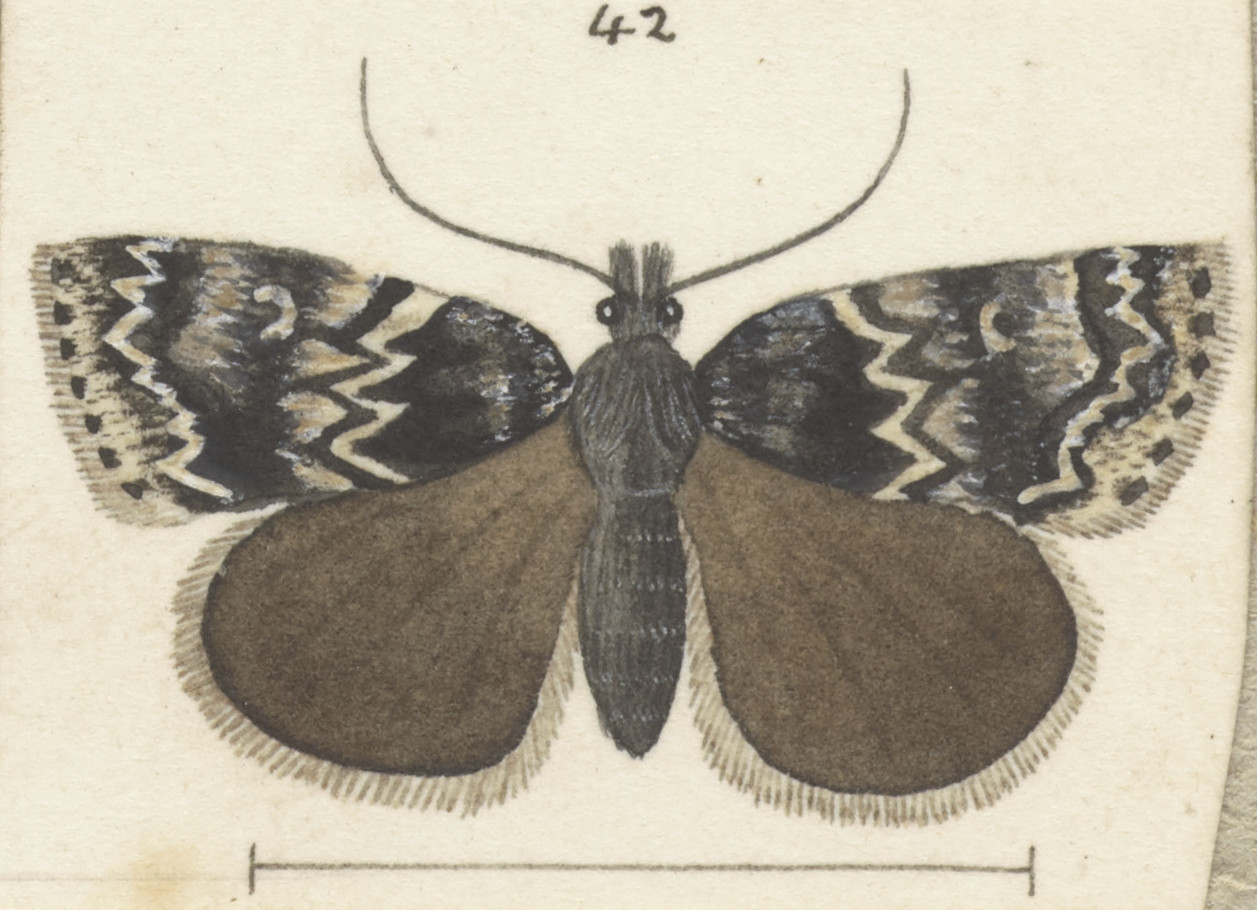
Illustration of female.

Meyrick described the adult male of this species as follows:

Male. — 22 mm. Head, palpi, and thorax grey, densely mixed with black. Antennae and abdomen blackish-grey. Legs blackish-grey, apex of joints ochreous-whitish. Forewings rather elongate-triangular, costa hardly arched, apex obtuse, hindmargin rather obliquely rounded; grey, densely irrorated with black; a black dentate line near base, preceded and followed by a white irroration; lines whitish, dentate, margined with black; first from 1/3 of costa to before middle of inner margin, preceded by a blackish band, and followed by a whitish irroration; second from 4/5 of costa to 3/4 of inner margin, rather curved, indented beneath costa, preceded by a white suffused irroration on upper half : cilia grey, irrorated with black on basal half. Hindwings and cilia dark fuscous grey.

This species is variable in appearance with some specimens being smaller and darker than typical specimens.

== Distribution ==
This species is endemic to New Zealand. Hudson regarded this species as rare. It has been observed in the South Island.

== Habitat ==
T. gorgopis inhabits rocky places or fellfields on high mountains.

== Behaviour ==
This species is commonly observed from December until February. Adults fly with great agility in the hottest sunshine.
