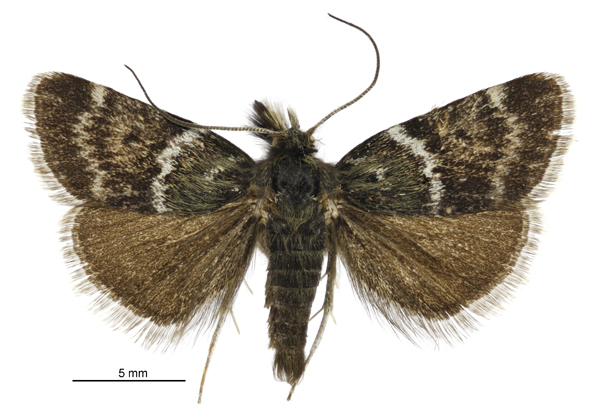
- Tauroscopa gorgopis

Scientific classification
- Kingdom: Animalia
- Phylum: Arthropoda
- Clade: Pancrustacea
- Class: Insecta
- Order: Lepidoptera
- Family: Crambidae
- Subfamily: Crambinae
- Tribe: Chiloini
- Genus: Tauroscopa; Meyrick, 1888

Synonyms
- Oressaula Turner, 1913

= Tauroscopa =

Genus of moths

Tauroscopa is a genus of moths of the family Crambidae. The genus has species found in Australia and New Zealand.

== Species ==
- Tauroscopa gorgopis Meyrick, 1888
- Tauroscopa lachnaea (Turner, 1913)
- Tauroscopa notabilis Philpott, 1923
- Tauroscopa trapezitis Meyrick, 1905
