= Tauroscopa lachnaea =

Scientific classification
- Kingdom: Animalia
- Phylum: Arthropoda
- Clade: Pancrustacea
- Class: Insecta
- Order: Lepidoptera
- Family: Crambidae
- Subfamily: Crambinae
- Tribe: Chiloini
- Genus: Tauroscopa
- Species: T. lachnaea

Binomial name
- Tauroscopa lachnaea (Turner, 1913)

Synonyms
- Oressaula lachnaea Turner, 1913

Species of moth

Tauroscopa lachnaea is a moth in the family Crambidae. It was described by Alfred Jefferis Turner in 1913. It is found in Australia, where it has been recorded from New South Wales.
