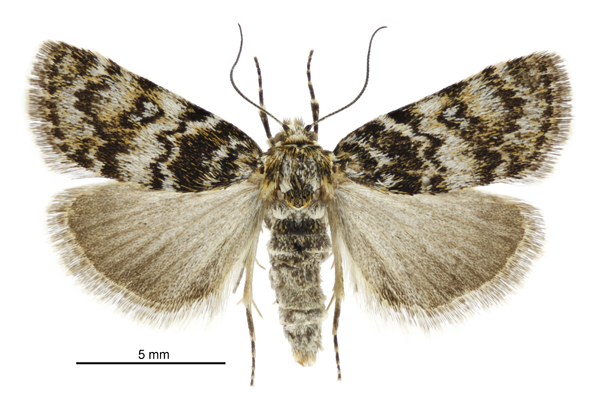
- Female
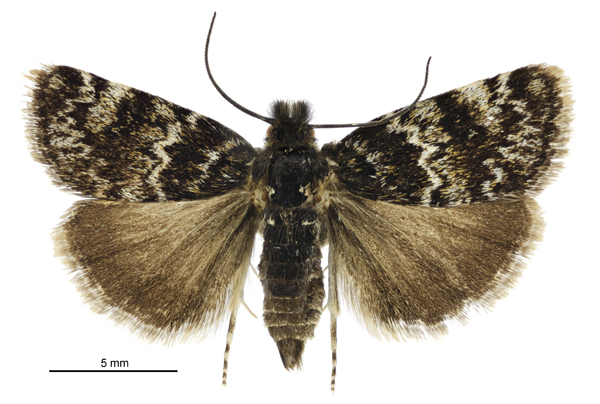
- Male

Scientific classification
- Kingdom: Animalia
- Phylum: Arthropoda
- Clade: Pancrustacea
- Class: Insecta
- Order: Lepidoptera
- Family: Crambidae
- Genus: Tauroscopa
- Species: T. notabilis

Binomial name
- Tauroscopa notabilis Philpott, 1923

= Tauroscopa notabilis =

Species of moth endemic to New Zealand

Tauroscopa notabilis is a moth of the family Crambidae. It was described by Alfred Philpott in 1923. It is endemic to New Zealand.

== Taxonomy ==
This species was first described by Alfred Philpott in 1923.

== Description ==
T. notabilis was described by Philpott as follows:

♂. 20mm. Head, palpi, and thorax black mixed with ochreous-whitish. Antennae black. Abdomen fuscous-black, anal tuft mixed with ochreous. Legs fuscous, tibiae and tarsi almost wholly whitish-ochreous. Forewings rather short, costa slightly arched at base, thence straight, apex rectangular, termen faintly rounded, little oblique, blackish-fuscous sprinkled with ochreous and white scales; an indistinct basal line, curved, irregular, white; first line from 1/3 costa to 2/5 dorsum, dentate at middle, white, suffusedly margined anteriorly and narrowly posteriorly with black; a discal blackish blotch in whitish median shade; second line from 1/4 costa to 4/5 dorsum, weakly dentate, roundly projecting above middle, white, narrowly margined anteriorly and suffusedly posteriorly, except at middle, with blackish; a subterminal whitish shade; a series of round black spots on termen : cilia grey, tips whitish. Hindwings pale fuscous: cilia fuscous, tips whitish.

== Distribution ==
This species is endemic to New Zealand and is found in the South Island.
