= Adams Island (New Zealand) =

Island off Southern New Zealand

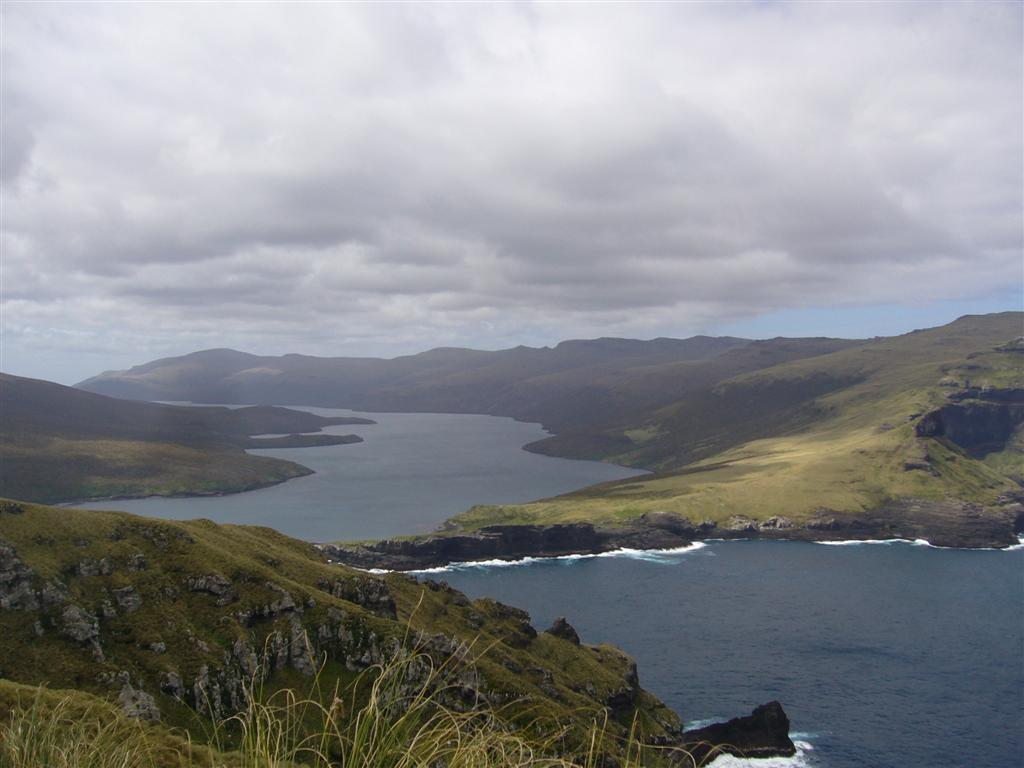
- Adams Island, to the right of Carnley Harbour

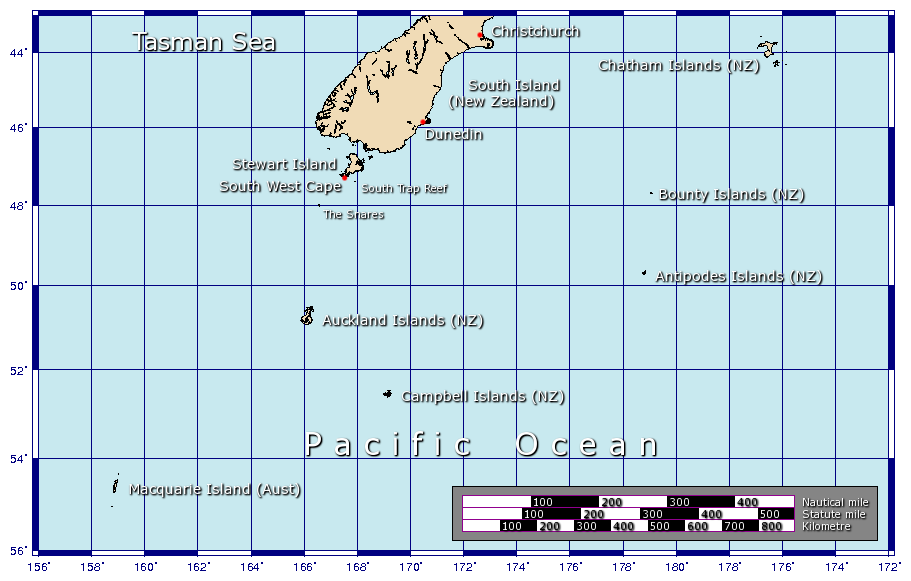
- Position relative to New Zealand and other outlying islands

Geography
- Coordinates: 50°53′S 166°04′E
- Archipelago: Auckland Islands
- Area: 100 km^{2} (39 sq mi)
- Highest elevation: 705 m (2313 ft)
- Highest point: Mount Dick

Administration
- New Zealand

Demographics
- Population: 0

Adams Island is the second largest island of New Zealand's Auckland Islands archipelago.

== Geography ==
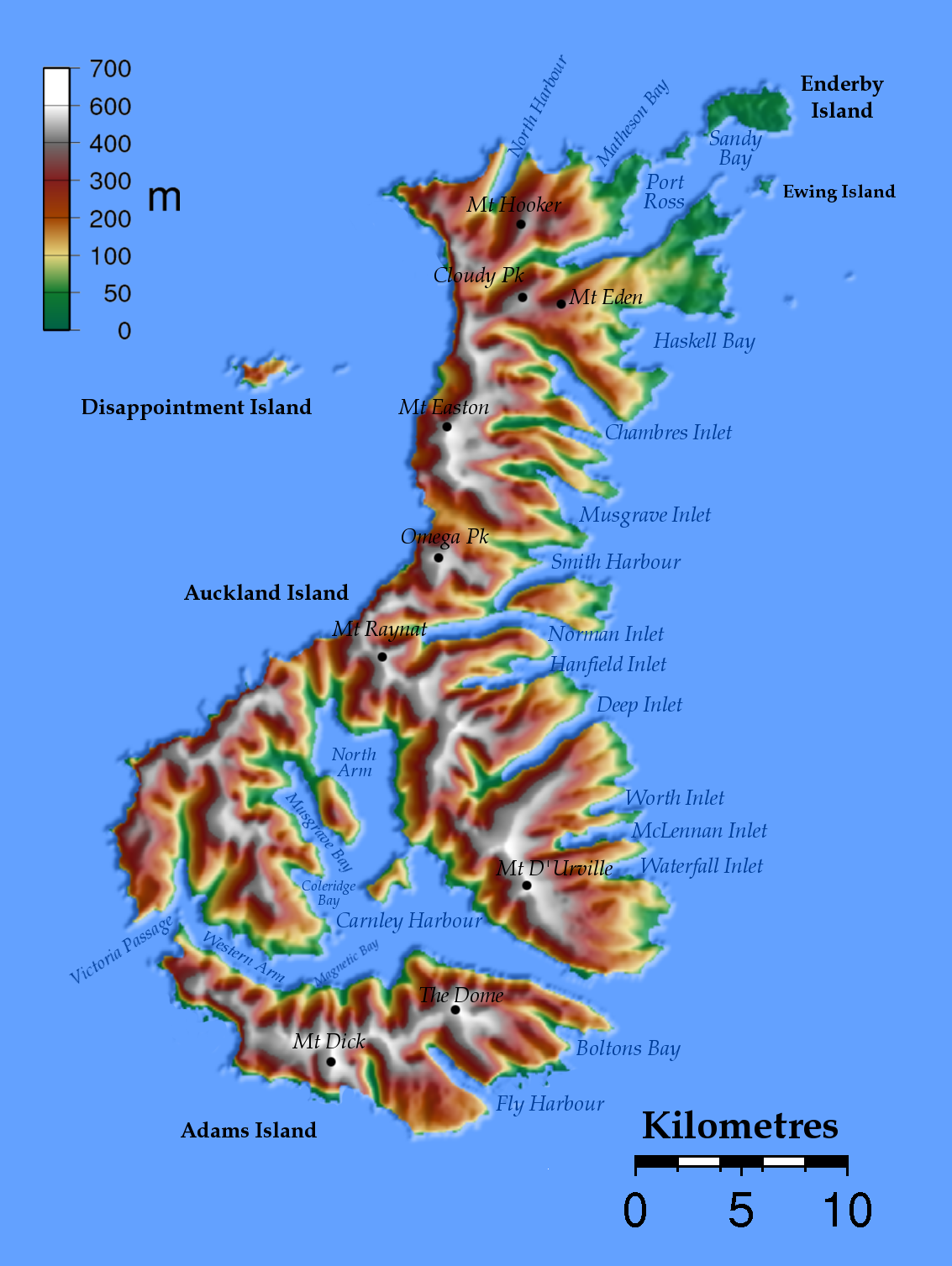
Map of the Auckland Islands, showing Adams Island to the south of the main island

Adams Island reaches a height of 705 m (2,313 ft) at Mount Dick. The channel is the remnant of the crater of an extinct volcano, with Adams Island, and the southern part of Auckland Island forming the crater rim.

Two large indentations, Bolton's Bay and Fly Harbour, are the most prominent features of the island's south coast, both in the south east.

The northern, sheltered coastline of Adams Island is forested, with shrubland, grassland and fellfield at higher altitudes, and herbfield in open, fertile sites. Its exposed southern coastline has high cliffs with narrow herbfields above them. This variety in habitat supports the island's bird life.

== Flora and fauna ==
The island is part of the Auckland Island group Important Bird Area (IBA), identified as such by BirdLife International because of the significance of the group as a breeding site for several species of seabirds as well as the endemic Auckland shag, Auckland teal, Auckland rail and Auckland snipe.

The island is notable in that no introduced mammals have ever established on Adams Island; it is the largest island in New Zealand with this status. Thus, the island's birdlife is close to what it would've been before its discovery by humans, including species that are rare or extirpated on Auckland Island. Most species are abundant, due to a lack of introduced predators.

The island has 48 extant bird species (22 land birds and 26 seabirds), of which 34 (16 land birds and 18 seabirds) are known to breed or are likely to breed there. 8 invasive species are present on the island, of which 6 probably breed there.

== See also ==
- Auckland Islands
- Composite Antarctic Gazetteer
- List of Antarctic and subantarctic islands
- List of islands of New Zealand
- New Zealand subantarctic islands
- Scientific Committee on Antarctic Research
