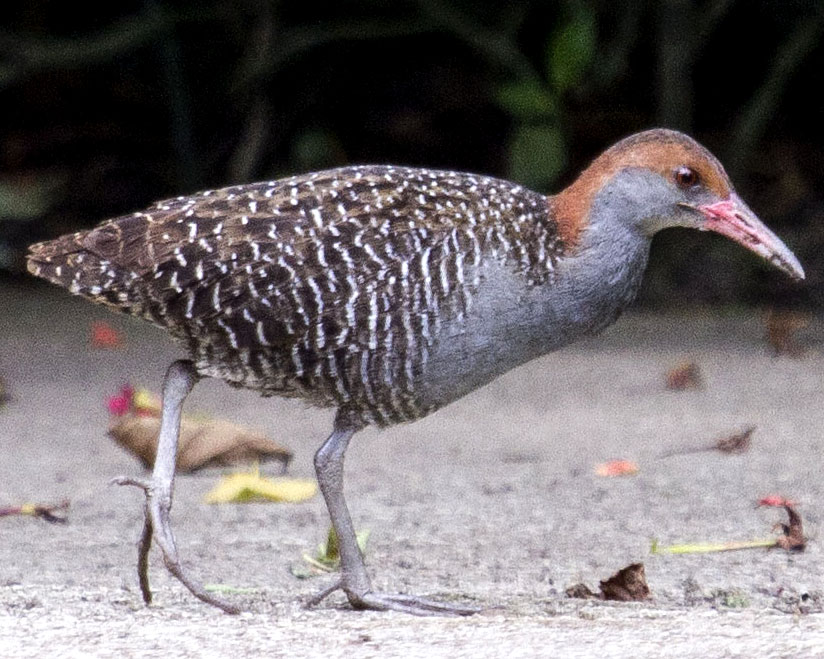
- Slaty-breasted rail in Malaysia

Conservation status
- Least Concern (IUCN 3.1)

Scientific classification
- Kingdom: Animalia
- Phylum: Chordata
- Class: Aves
- Order: Gruiformes
- Family: Rallidae
- Genus: Lewinia
- Species: L. striata

Binomial name
- Lewinia striata (Linnaeus, 1766)
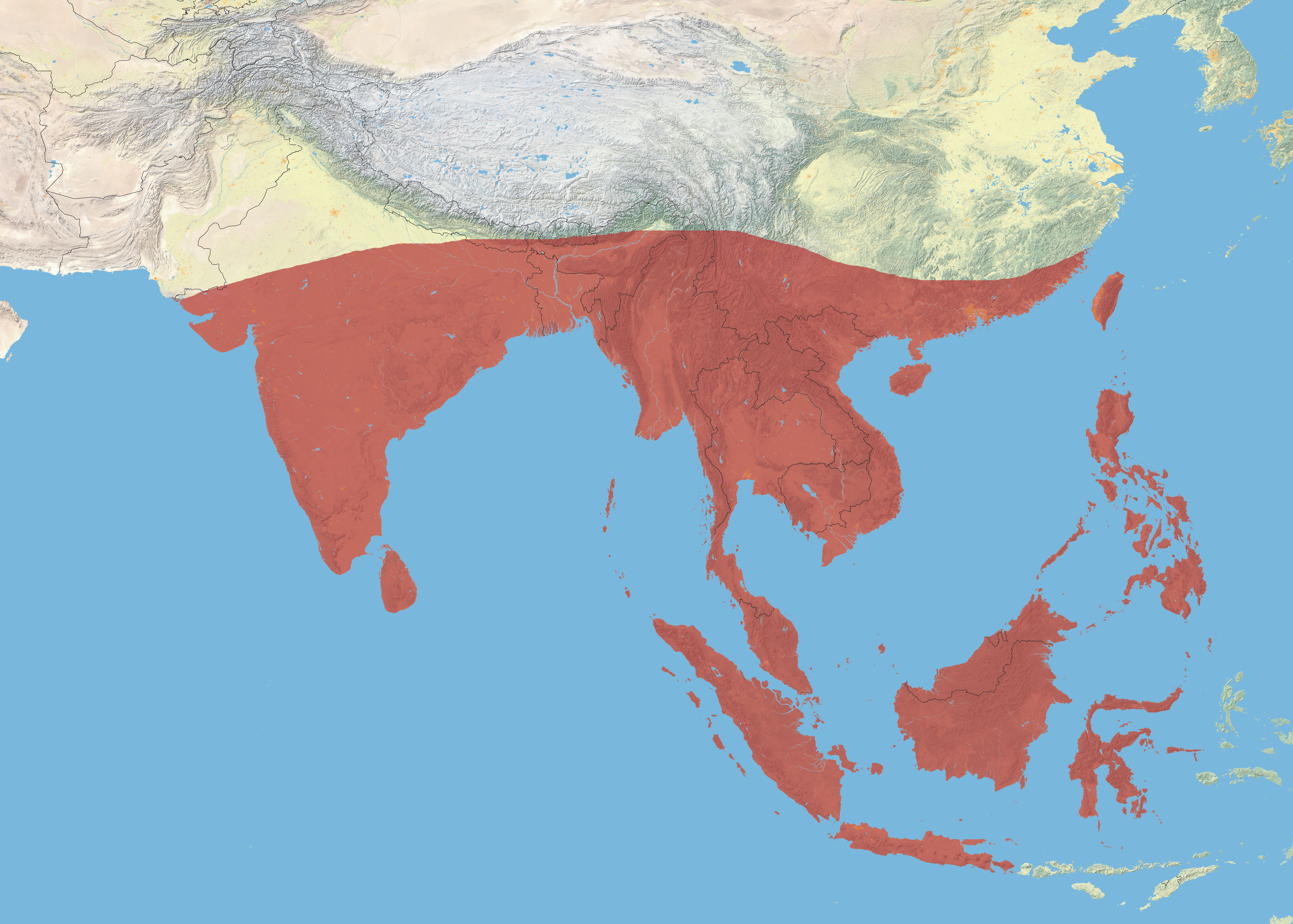
- approximate range

Synonyms
- Gallirallus striatus Linnaeus, 1766 *Rallus striatus Linnaeus, 1766

= Slaty-breasted rail =

Species of bird

The slaty-breasted rail (Lewinia striata) is a rail species native to the Indian subcontinent and Southeast Asia.

== Taxonomy ==
Despite traditionally being considered part of Gallirallus, recent genetic studies have consistently placed it in the genus Lewinia, which is now formally recognized by the IUCN and IOC.

=== Subspecies ===
L. s. albiventer

L. s. obscurior

L. s. jouyi

L. s. taiwana

L. s. gularis

L. s. striata

L. s. paraterma

== Habitat ==
The slaty-breasted rail is mostly found in wetlands, up to elevations of typically 1,000 m (3,300 ft), but also up to 1,500 m (4,900 ft) and 1,850 m (6,070 ft) in Sri Lanka.

== Description ==
A medium sized rail, it measures 25–30 cm (9.8–11.8 in) in length and weighs 100–142 g (3.5–5.0 oz). In coloration, the slaty-breasted rail has a chestnut crown and nape, a blue-grey breast, and a long, reddish bill.

== Behavior ==
Breeding season can vary by location. It lays 5–9 eggs, which are incubated by both sexes for 19–22 days. Chicks can leave the nest soon after hatching, they are fed and cared for by their parents.

It feeds on worms, molluscs, crustaceans, and the seeds of marsh plants.

== Gallery ==
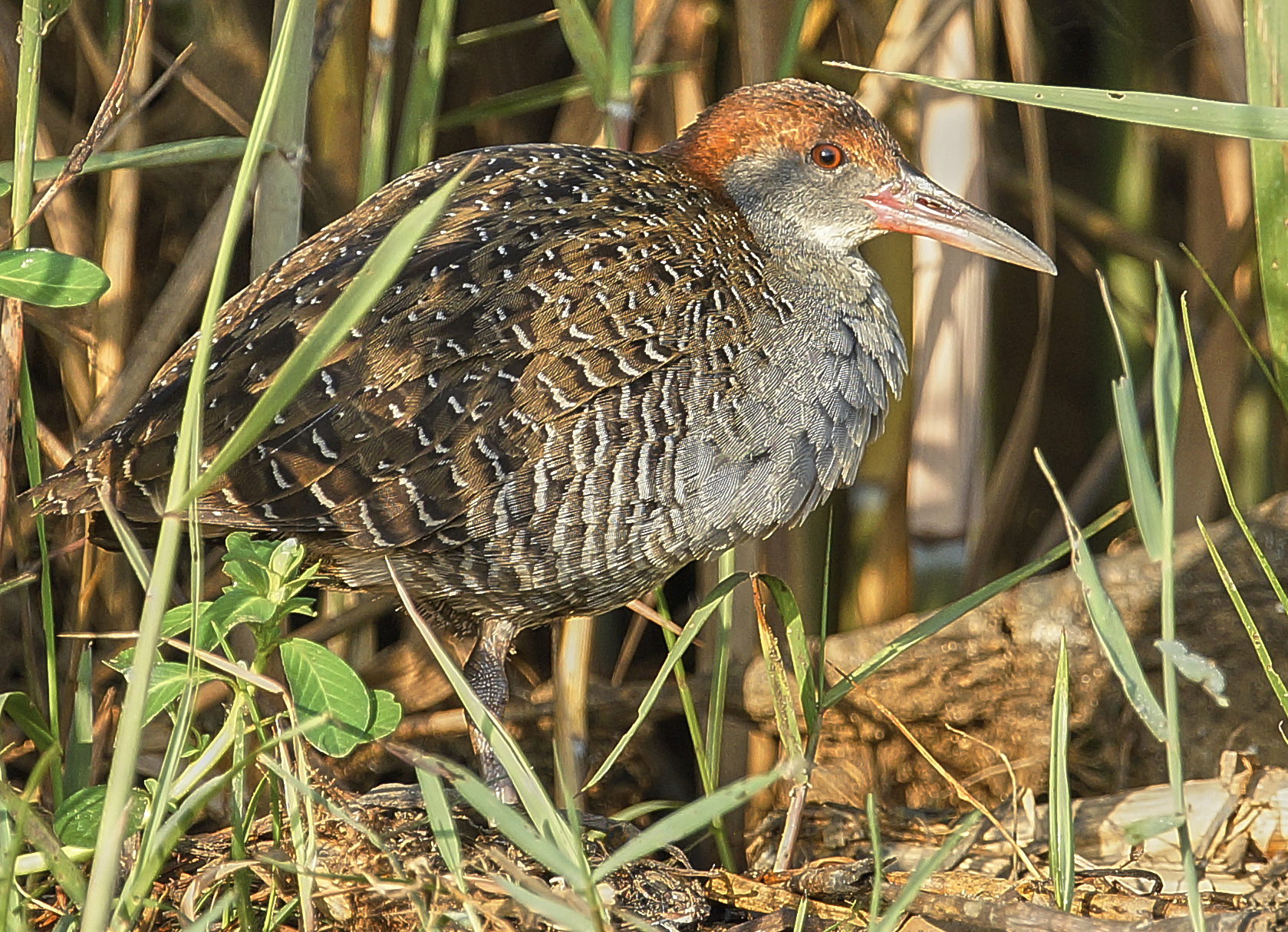
Slaty-breasted rail at Chilika Lake, Odisha, India

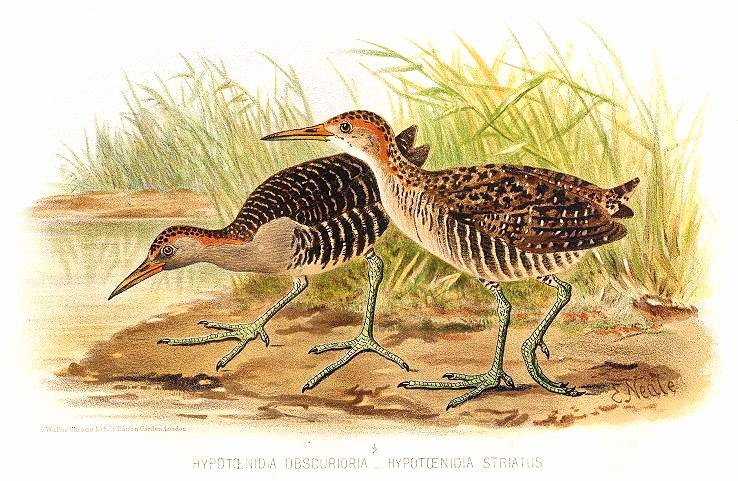
Illustration of slaty-breasted rails by Edward Neale c. 1890

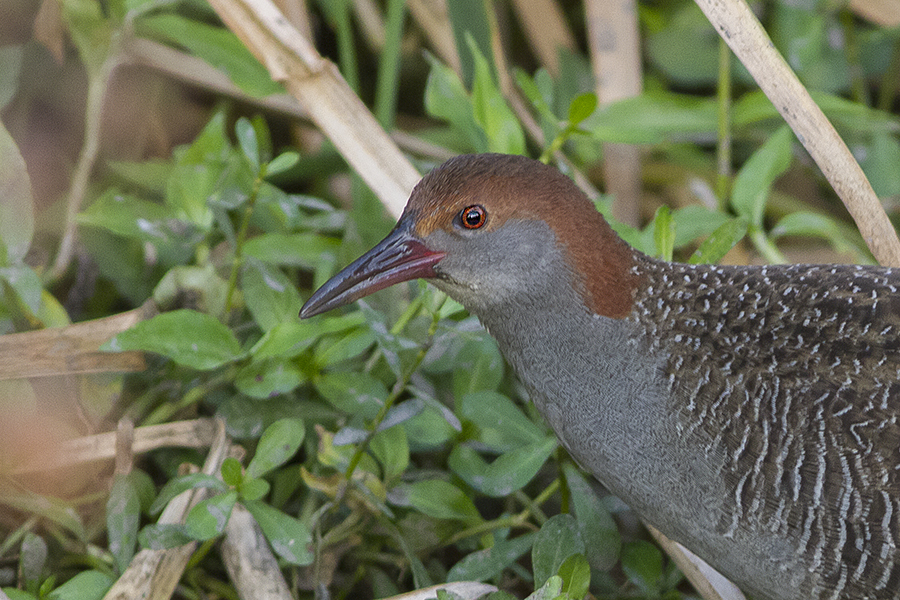
Slaty-breasted rail in East Kolkata Wetlands, West Bengal, India

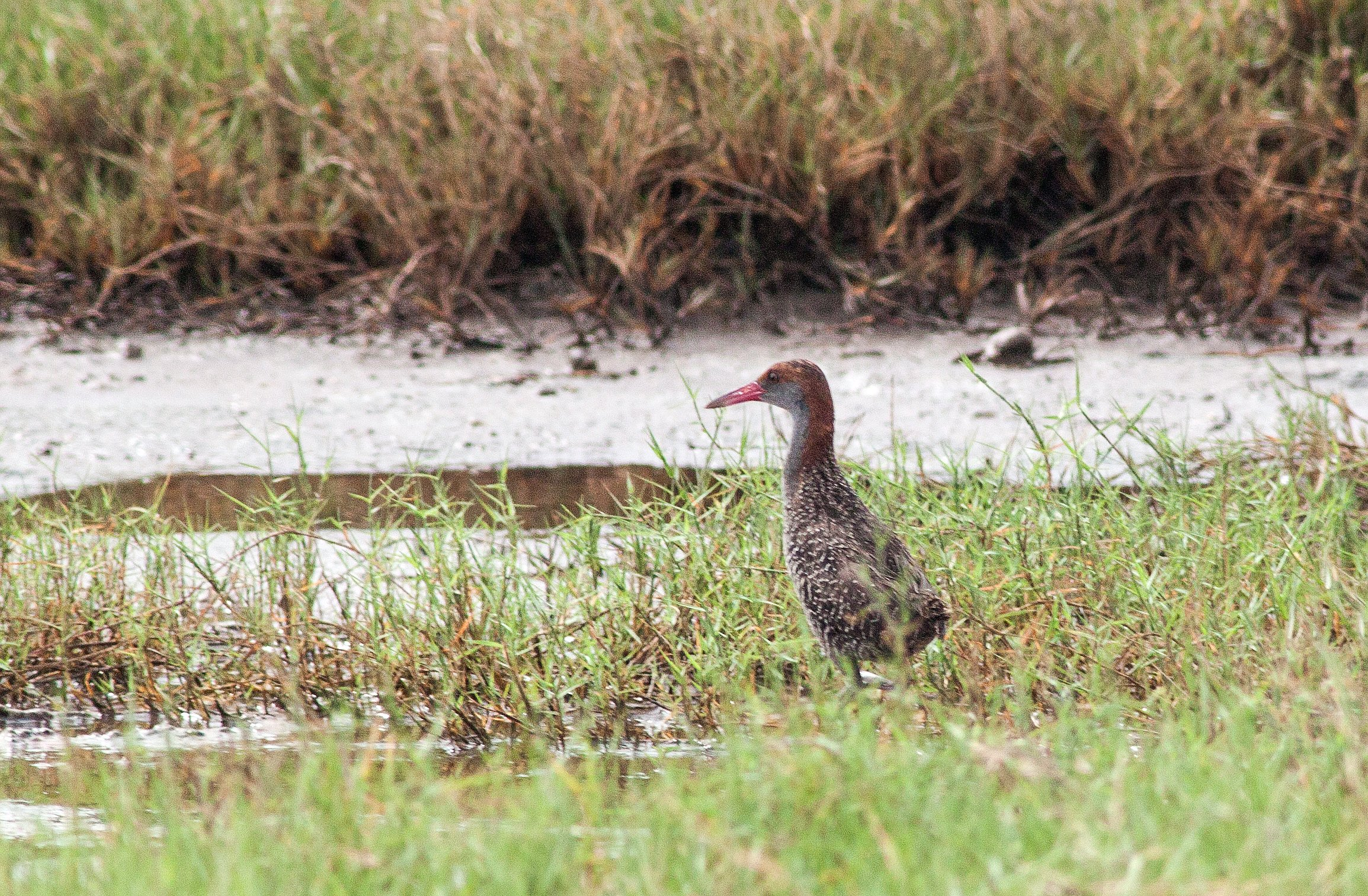
Slaty-breasted rail in the wetlands of Vasai, Maharashtra, India
