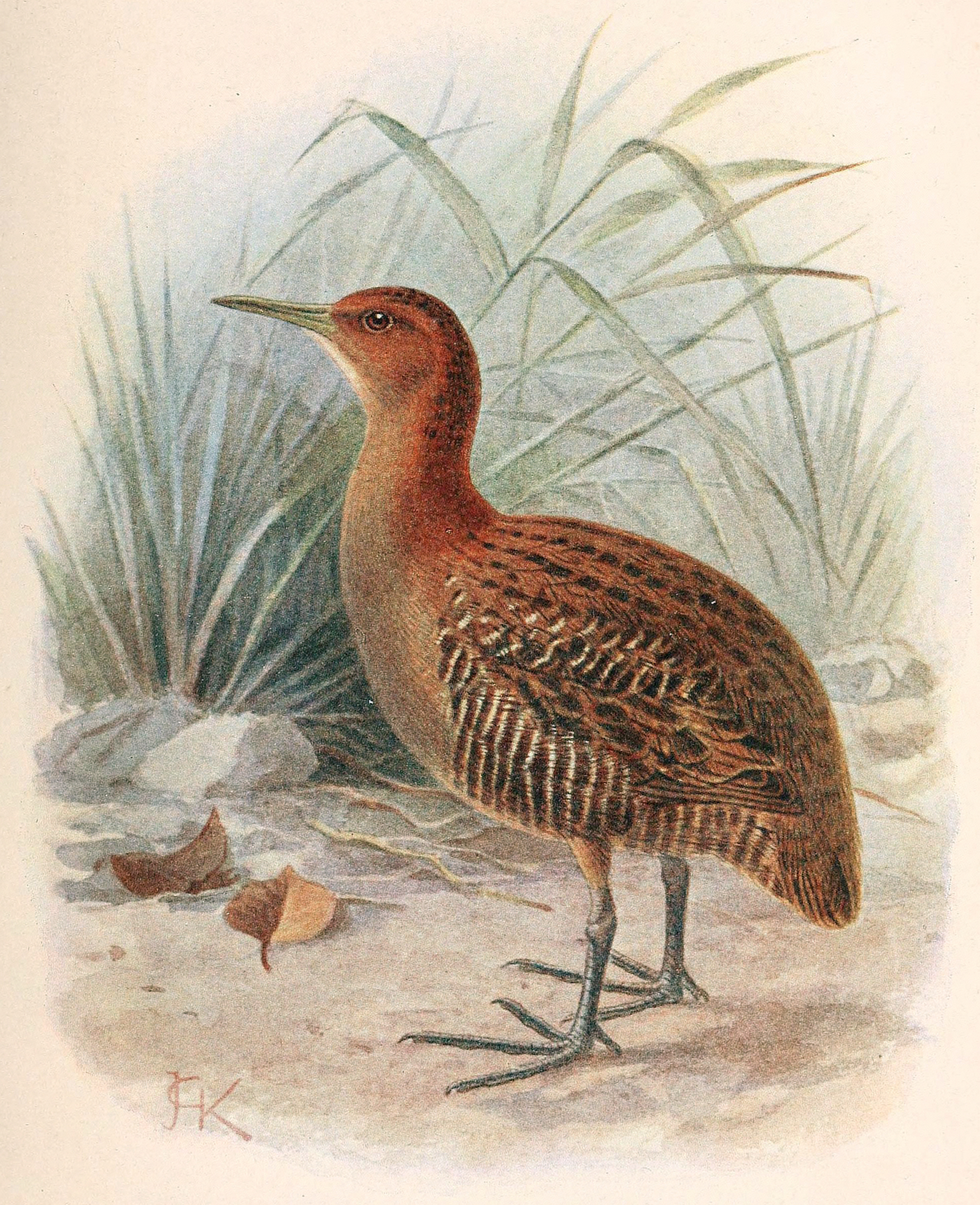
- Auckland rail (Lewinia muelleri)

Scientific classification
- Kingdom: Animalia
- Phylum: Chordata
- Class: Aves
- Order: Gruiformes
- Family: Rallidae
- Genus: Lewinia; Gray, GR, 1855

Type species
- Rallus lewini Swainson, 1838

Species
- see text

= Lewinia =

Genus of birds

Lewinia is a genus of birds in the family Rallidae.

The genus was erected by the English zoologist George Robert Gray in 1855 with Lewin's rail Lewinia pectoralis as the type species. The genus name is from a synonym of the type species Rallus lewinii Swainson, 1837. The common name commemorates the English engraver and naturalist John Lewin (1770–1819) who settled in Australia.

== Species ==
The genus contains the following four species:

Image	Scientific name	Common name	Distribution
	Lewinia pectoralis	Lewin's rail	Australia, Wallacea, and New Guinea.
	Lewinia mirifica	Brown-banded rail	the Philippines, from Luzon and Samar.
	Lewinia muelleri	Auckland rail	Auckland Islands
	Lewinia striata	Slaty-breasted rail	South and Southeast Asia
