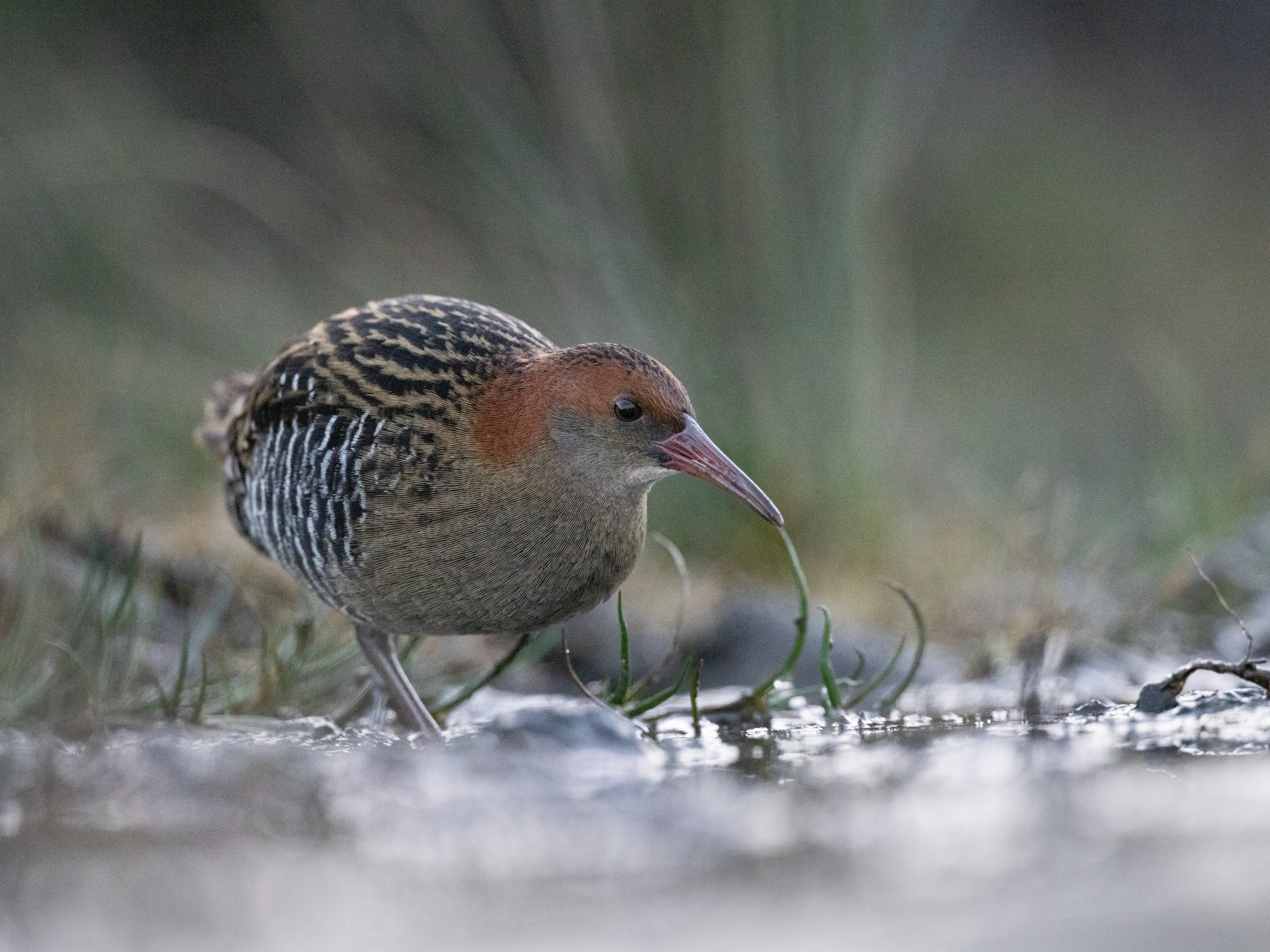

Conservation status
- Least Concern (IUCN 3.1)

Scientific classification
- Kingdom: Animalia
- Phylum: Chordata
- Class: Aves
- Order: Gruiformes
- Family: Rallidae
- Genus: Lewinia
- Species: L. pectoralis

Binomial name
- Lewinia pectoralis (Temminck, 1831)

Synonyms
- Rallus pectoralis Temminck, 1831

= Lewin's rail =

Species of bird

Lewin's rail (Lewinia pectoralis) is a species of bird in the family Rallidae.

== Names and taxonomy ==
Its common name and Latin binomial commemorate English naturalist and illustrator William Lewin.

It is also known as the water rail, Lewin's water rail, Lewin's grind rail, slate-breasted rail, slate-breasted water rail, pectoral rail, pectoral water rail, short-toed rail and short-toed water rail.

Eight subspecies have been described:

- L. p. exsul (Hartert, 1898) – Flores, Wallacea

New Guinea

- L. p. mayri (Hartert, 1930) – Arfak Mountains
- L. p. captus (Mayr & Gilliard, 1951) - central New Guinea
- L. p. insulsus (Greenway, 1935) - Herzog Mountains
- L. p. alberti (Rothschild & Hartert, 1907) - mountains of south-eastern New Guinea

Australia

- L. p. clelandi (Mathews, 1911) – south-western Australia (extinct)
- L. p. pectoralis (Temminck, 1831) – eastern and south-eastern Australia
- L. p. brachipus (Swainson, 1838) – Tasmania

== Description ==
Lewin's rail measures 18–27 cm (7.1–10.6 in) in total length, with a wingspan of 31–35 cm (12–14 in). Females average 82 g (2.9 oz) in weight while males average 88 g (3.1 oz). In coloration, the abdomen is a barred black and white and the wings are mottled and have "black-to-chestnut" stripes.

== Conservation status ==
Lewin's rails are not listed as threatened on the Australian Environment Protection and Biodiversity Conservation Act 1999. However, their conservation status varies from state to state within Australia. For example:

Lewin's rail is listed as threatened on the Victorian Flora and Fauna Guarantee Act (1988). Under this Act, an Action Statement for the recovery and future management of this species has not yet been prepared. It is also notable that the Lewin's rail is listed by an earlier scientific name (Dryolimnas pectoralis) under this Act.

On the 2007 advisory list of threatened vertebrate fauna in Victoria, the Lewin's rail is listed as vulnerable.

A subspecies of Lewin's rail, listed as Lewin's water rail (Rallus pectoralis clelandi), is on Western Australia's Wildlife Conservation (Specially Protected Fauna) Notice 2008 Schedule 2 — Fauna presumed to be extinct, under the WA Wildlife Conservation Act 1950.

Along Kedron Brook in Brisbane, the bird is described as rare and threatened. The Brisbane Airport's construction of a second runway initially included 38 hectares of wetlands to be set aside for habitat. This was later expanded to 49 hectares to provide a more appropriate vegetation corridor.

Lewin's rail is protected under the Nature Conservation Act 1992. It is an offence to damage or interfere with Lewin's rail in any other way than when accepted by the Act.

Redland City Council manages environmental pests throughout the Redlands to minimize their impact on native ecosystems and birds such as Lewin's rail.

Loss of habitat due to changes in water body structure, disruption of nests, and predation by introduced species.

== Habits ==
Lewin's rail is a highly secretive bird. This species prefers permanent, fresh-to-saline wetlands surrounded by dense vegetation. That means it can be found in artificial wetlands surrounded by dense vegetation.

Its diet consists mostly of earthworms, molluscs and arthropods. It also occasionally consumes amphibians and bird eggs.

The breeding season of the Lewin's rail varies by location, with it starting earlier in Australia compared to New Guinea. It lays three to eight eggs at daily intervals in their saucer-shaped ground nests, which they build from dry vegetation such as reeds and grasses. The nests usually sit just above the water's edge in dense reeds and grassland. The eggs are incubated for 19–20 days, likely by only the female. The chicks hatch covered in black down. Young are fed by both parents. They may raise two broods per season.

== Media ==
South East Queensland

Lewin's rail
Call recorded at Samsonvale Cemetery, SE Queensland

== See also ==
- List of birds of Australia
- List of birds of Indonesia
- List of birds of Papua New Guinea
