= Fellfield =

Ecological area

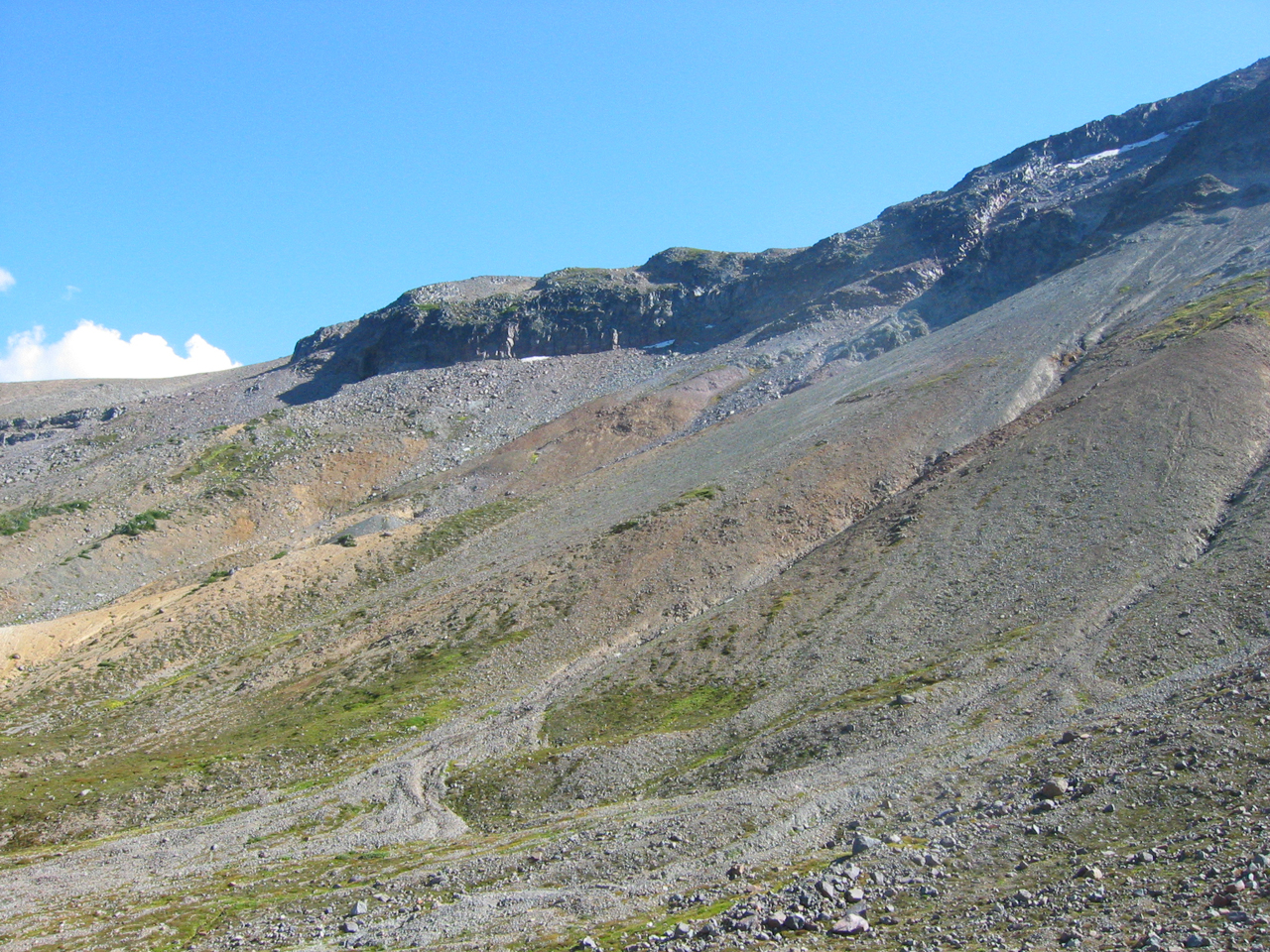
A fellfield in Mount Rainier National Park

A fellfield or fell field comprises the environment of a slope, usually alpine or tundra, where the dynamics of frost (freeze and thaw cycles) and of wind give rise to characteristic plant forms in scree interstices.

== Soil dynamics ==
The freeze-thaw cycles tend to push plants out of the soil. In addition, the high porosity of the soil makes a fellfield a difficult place for plants to grow. Fellfields often have typical patterns of rocks: lines of rocks that have been pushed out of the soil, and slid into a low region.

== Botany ==
In botany the term "fellfield" describes an ecoregion, ecosystem, habitat, or plant community. The term frequently used is alpine fellfield. Fellfield is usually applied to an alpine tundra region of high altitude mountains, or high latitude islands, and the alpine plants there.

=== Flora ===
Fellfields are typically populated by cushion plants: perennials that grow close to the ground. Cushion plants are well-adapted to the dryness and short growing season of a fellfield. Cushion plants often have hairy foliage and long taproots, to gather and retain moisture. Examples of cushion plants include the lupines and buckwheats.

==== Fellfield species ====
- Alpine flora list
  - Azorella selago
  - Oenothera xylocarpa
  - Calyptridium umbellatum

Some geologists find it is controversial to share the term for biology and geomorphology applications.

== See also ==
- Feldmark
