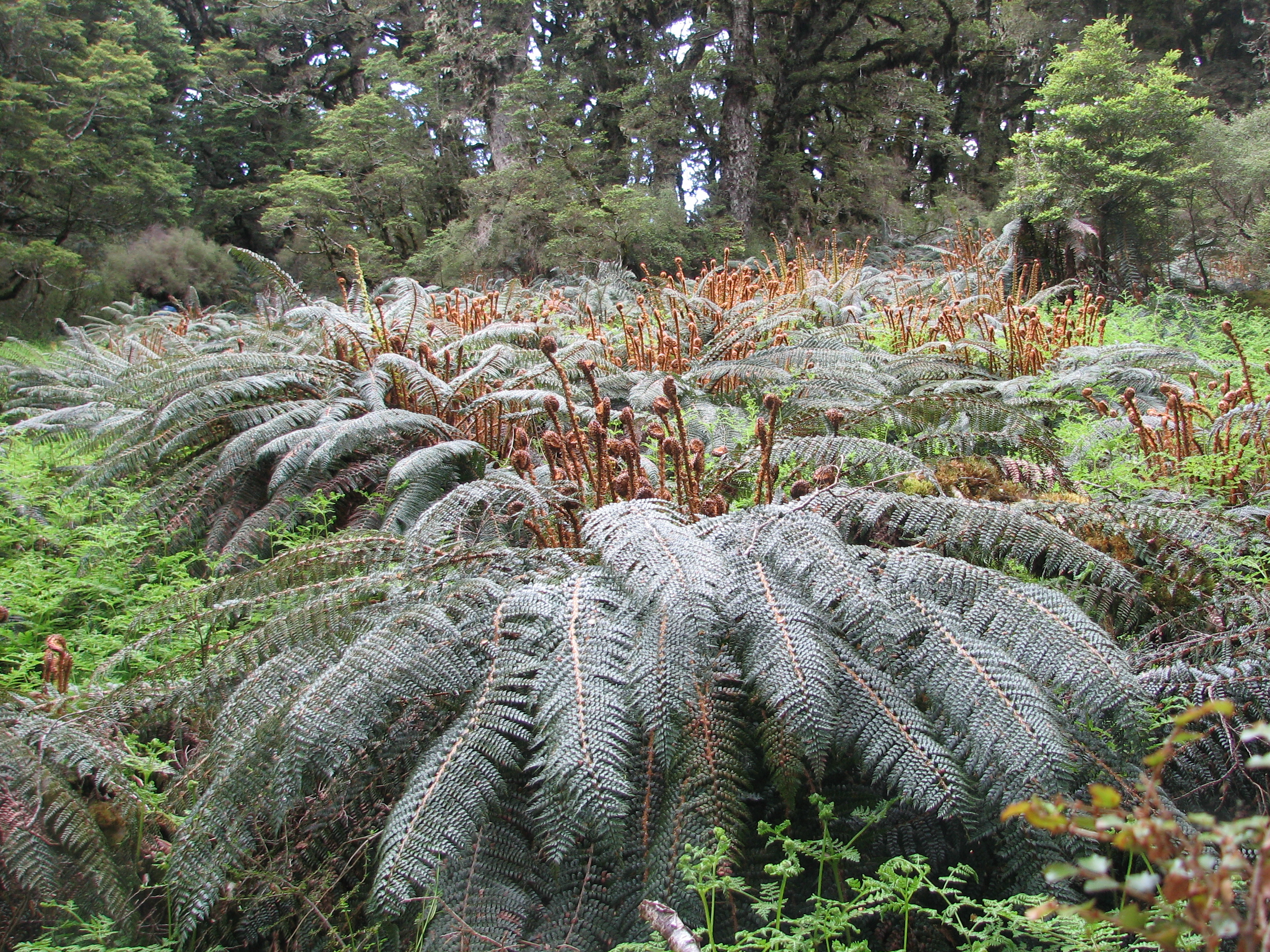

Scientific classification
- Kingdom: Plantae
- Clade: Tracheophytes
- Division: Polypodiophyta
- Class: Polypodiopsida
- Order: Polypodiales
- Suborder: Polypodiineae
- Family: Dryopteridaceae
- Genus: Polystichum
- Species: P. vestitum

Binomial name
- Polystichum vestitum (G.Forst.) C.Presl

Synonyms
- Polypodium vestitum G.Forst.; Aspidium vestitum (G.Forst.) Sw.; Polystichum venustum Hombr.; Aspidium venustum (Hombr.) Hook.f.

= Polystichum vestitum =

Species of fern

Polystichum vestitum, commonly known as the prickly shield fern or pūnui (Māori), is a hardy, evergreen or semi-evergreen ground fern.

== Description ==
Polystichum vestitum is a terrestrial fern with an erect and scaly rhizome, sometimes forming a short trunk and growing up to 700 mm in height. The fronds are 220–600 mm long. There are 3–7 round sori on each pinnule, halfway between the margin and midrib, with a light brown indusium. The ferns are usually bicolour with a dark brown centre that is surrounded by margins that are a pale brown. On ferns found on the Chatham Islands and subantarctic islands, the dark brown centre can be reduced and therefore less obvious. The etymology of Polystichum comes from the Greek words polus and stikhos, which can be translated as "many rows" and refers to the parallel rows of spore cases on the underside of the fronds. Vestitum has its origins from the Latin vestire and means "to be clothed", denoting the dense cover of the scales on its leaf stalks.

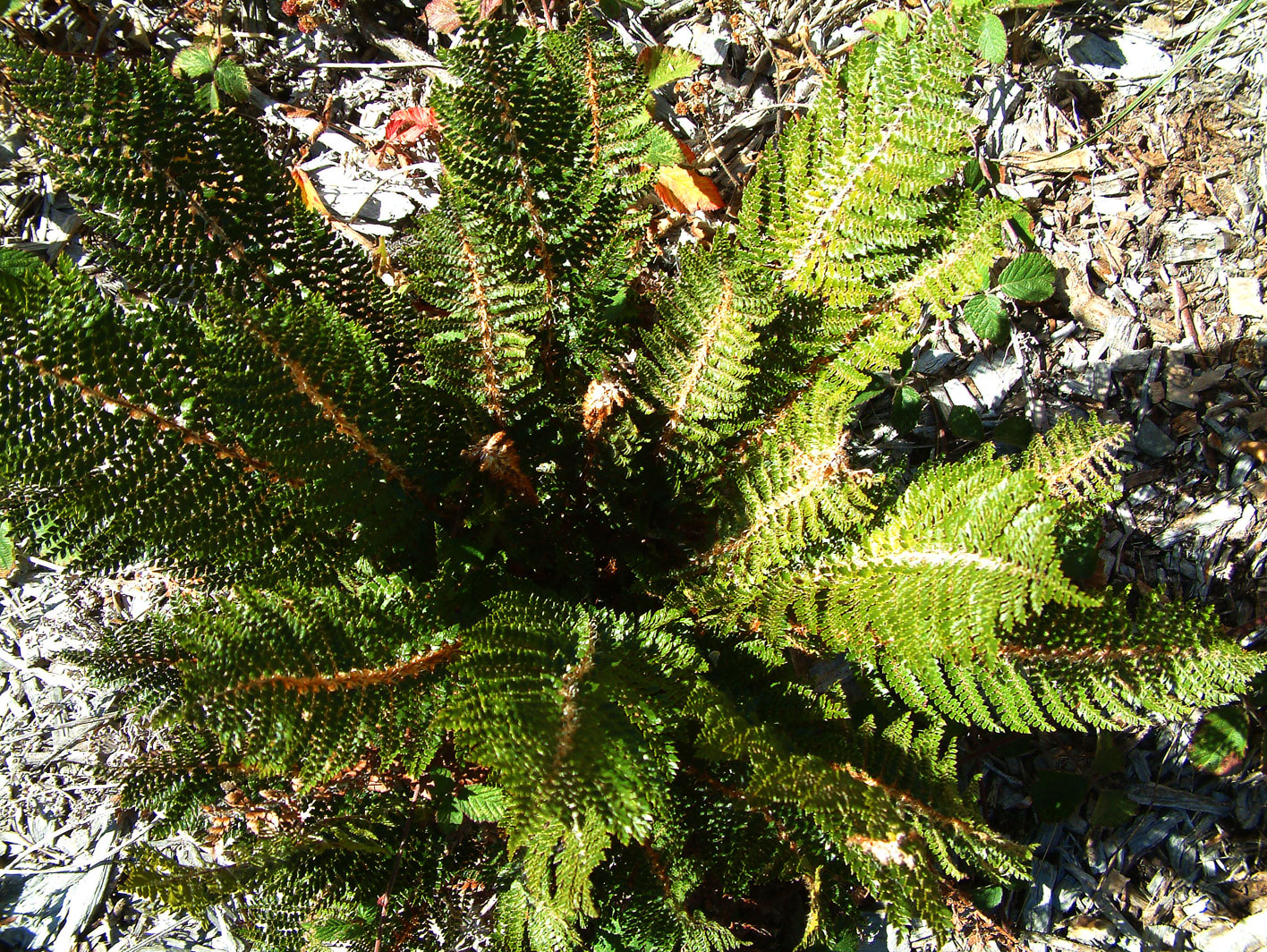
Closeup of individual prickly shield fern

== Distribution ==
The prickly shield fern is native to New Zealand and the Chatham Islands, as well as to New Zealand's subantarctic Snares, Antipodes, Auckland and Campbell Islands, and to Australia’s Macquarie Island.

=== New Zealand range ===
The prickly shield fern is found on the North and South Island's of New Zealand, however it is not very common north of Auckland or the Coromandel Peninsula.

=== Macquarie Island ===
On Macquarie Island it dominates the fernbrake communities which typically occur on the eastern, leeward side of the island on valley slopes and sheltered valley floors. Although it can form dense stands that often exclude other plants, it is more commonly found in conjunction with Stilbocarpa polaris, Poa foliosa and Pleurophyllum hookeri. The fern is seriously affected by rabbit grazing.

== Habitat ==
The prickly shield fern on the North Island is often found covering the hillsides and at higher altitudes where the climate is cooler, while on the South Island it can be found in a more varied range of habitats such as coastal and alpine regions, and at lower altitudes. It is common in exposed landscapes such as gulley floors, forest margins and tussock grasslands, but can also be found in abundance in cooler and wetter forests.

== Life cycle ==
The spores of P. vestitum are borne in round sori protected by round indusia – a characterisitic feature of the genus. Individual spores are monolete and bilaterally symmetrical located which provides unique identification for the species.

== Site preferences and predators ==
=== Site preferences ===
The prickly shield fern prefers soil that is free-draining and fertile, enriched with humus. It can survive in a wide range of environmental conditions. It prefers areas with more rainfall and can survive in temperature below 0°C, however, in these conditions the ferns are more often found under the forest canopy where it will be slightly warmer. It prefers wetter areas and is why it can often be found in gullies.

=== Predators, parasites, and diseases ===
On the underside of the fronds in silk tunnels, a tiny caterpillar of the "punui spore-eater" moth can be found living and eating the spores from the fern. There are also caterpillars from the "pale fern looper" and "zigzag fern looper" moth that feed on the fronds. The plant is also favored by deer and possums. In general, aphids, brown fern scale, caterpillars, mealy bug, slugs and snails are the most common pests to attack ferns. Other problems and diseases may include acid rot, algae, fungal diseases and moulding.

== Conservation ==
P. vestitum is found throughout much of New Zealand and its current conservation status is not threatened.
