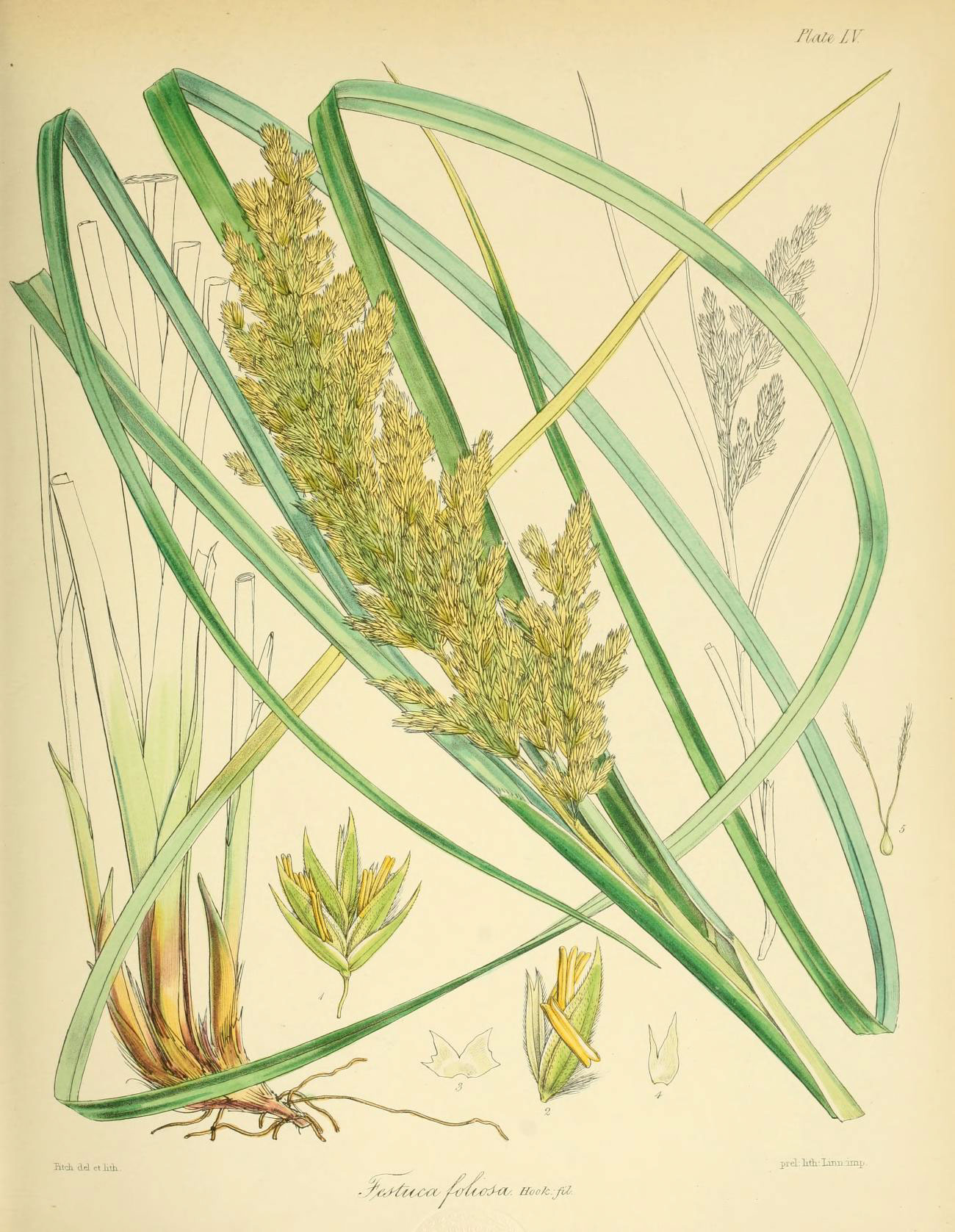
- Plate LV (artist Fitch)

Conservation status
- Naturally Uncommon (NZ TCS)

Scientific classification
- Kingdom: Plantae
- Clade: Tracheophytes
- Clade: Angiosperms
- Clade: Monocots
- Clade: Commelinids
- Order: Poales
- Family: Poaceae
- Subfamily: Pooideae
- Genus: Poa
- Species: P. foliosa

Binomial name
- Poa foliosa (Hook.f.) Hook.f.

Synonyms
- Festuca foliosa Hook.f.

= Poa foliosa =

Species of grass

Poa foliosa is a species of tussock grass commonly known as muttonbird poa. It is native to the subantarctic islands of New Zealand and Australia.

== Description ==
Poa foliosa is a perennial, dioecious grass growing as densely clumped tussocks up to 2 m in height. The tussocks arise from short, woody stolons, with the shoots covered at the base by the fibrous remnants of sheaths. The leaf-blades are 150–400 mm long and 3–6 mm wide. The plant flowers from October to December, and fruits from November to April.

== Distribution and habitat ==
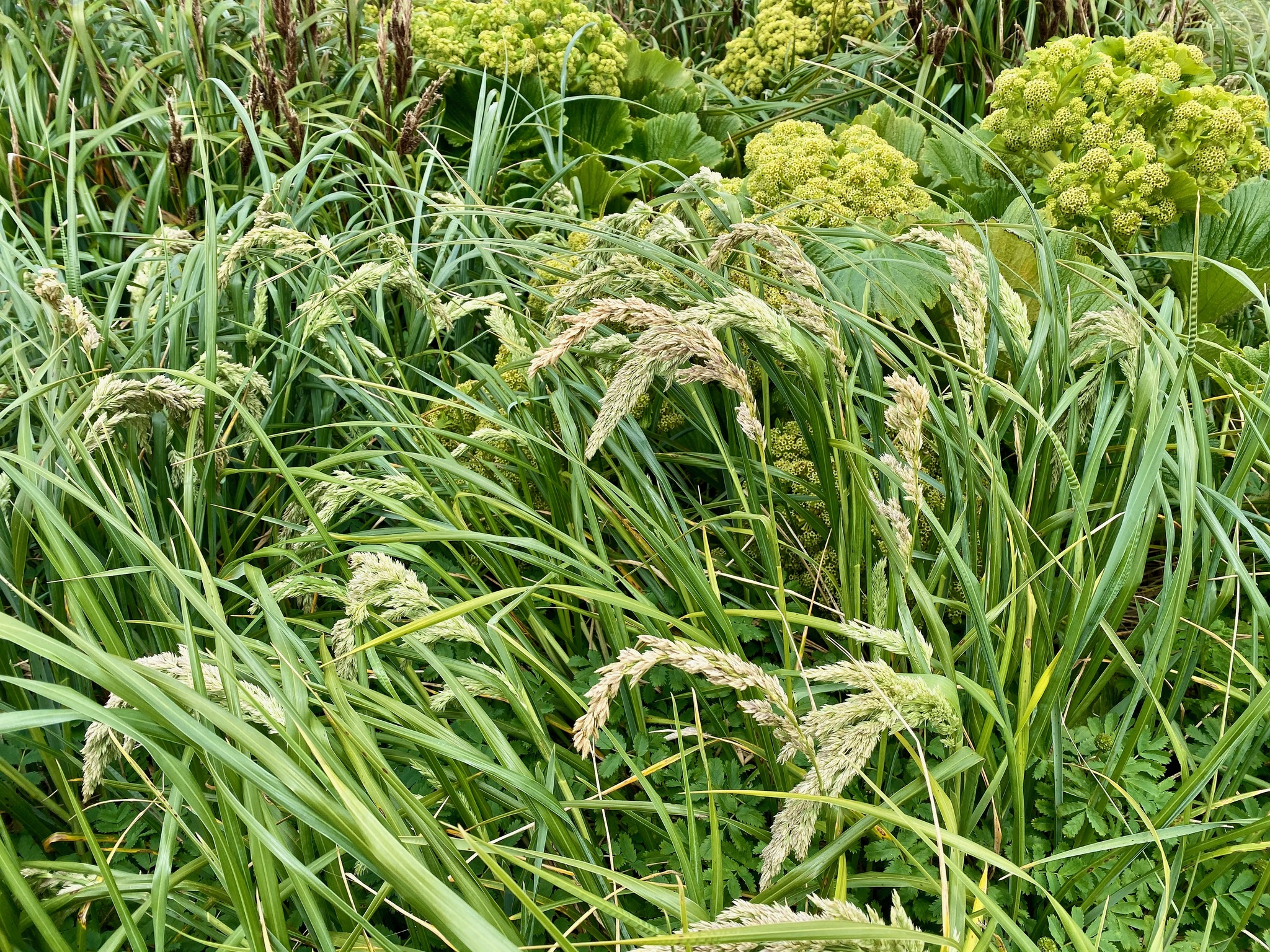
Poa foliosa on Auckland Island

In New Zealand the grass is found on the north-eastern Tītī / Muttonbird Islands, as well as on the Solander, Snares, Antipodes, Auckland and Campbell Islands. It is also found on Australia's Macquarie Island. The habitat is coastal and subcoastal, often near seabird colonies.

=== Macquarie Island ===
On Macquarie Island's coastal terraces and slopes it grows in mixed stands with Stilbocarpa polaris where the drainage is good, and along the borders of streams. It forms a tall tussock grassland along the beaches above the high-water mark, as well as patchily on the island's plateau in sheltered and relatively exposed sites. The upland grasslands are an important habitat for burrow-nesting petrels.

== Taxonomy ==
The species was first described in 1845 as Festuca foliosa by Joseph Hooker. In 1864 he redescribed it as belonging to the genus Poa.

== Conservation status ==
In both 2009 and 2012 it was deemed to be "At Risk - Naturally Uncommon" under the New Zealand Threat Classification System, and this New Zealand classification was reaffirmed in 2018 (due to its restricted range), with a further comment that it was safe overseas.
