= Elachista pumila =

Scientific classification
- Kingdom: Animalia
- Phylum: Arthropoda
- Class: Insecta
- Order: Lepidoptera
- Family: Elachistidae
- Genus: Elachista
- Species: E. pumila

Binomial name
- Elachista pumila (Dugdale, 1971)

Synonyms
- Irenicodes pumila Dugdale, 1971

Species of moth

Elachista pumila is a species of moth in the family Elachistidae. It was described by John S. Dugdale in 1971. This species is endemic to New Zealand, and can be found on Auckland Island.
