= Mount D'Urville =

Coordinates: 50.824394°S 166.147027°E

Mount D'Urville is one of the highest points on Auckland Island, one of New Zealand's subantarctic outlying islands, and is named after French explorer Jules Dumont d'Urville. It rises to a height of 630 m (2099 ft). It stands in the southeast of the main island, overlooking the mouth of Carnley Harbour. The higher peak of Mount Dick, on Adams Island, is visible from it, 12 kilometres to the southwest.
