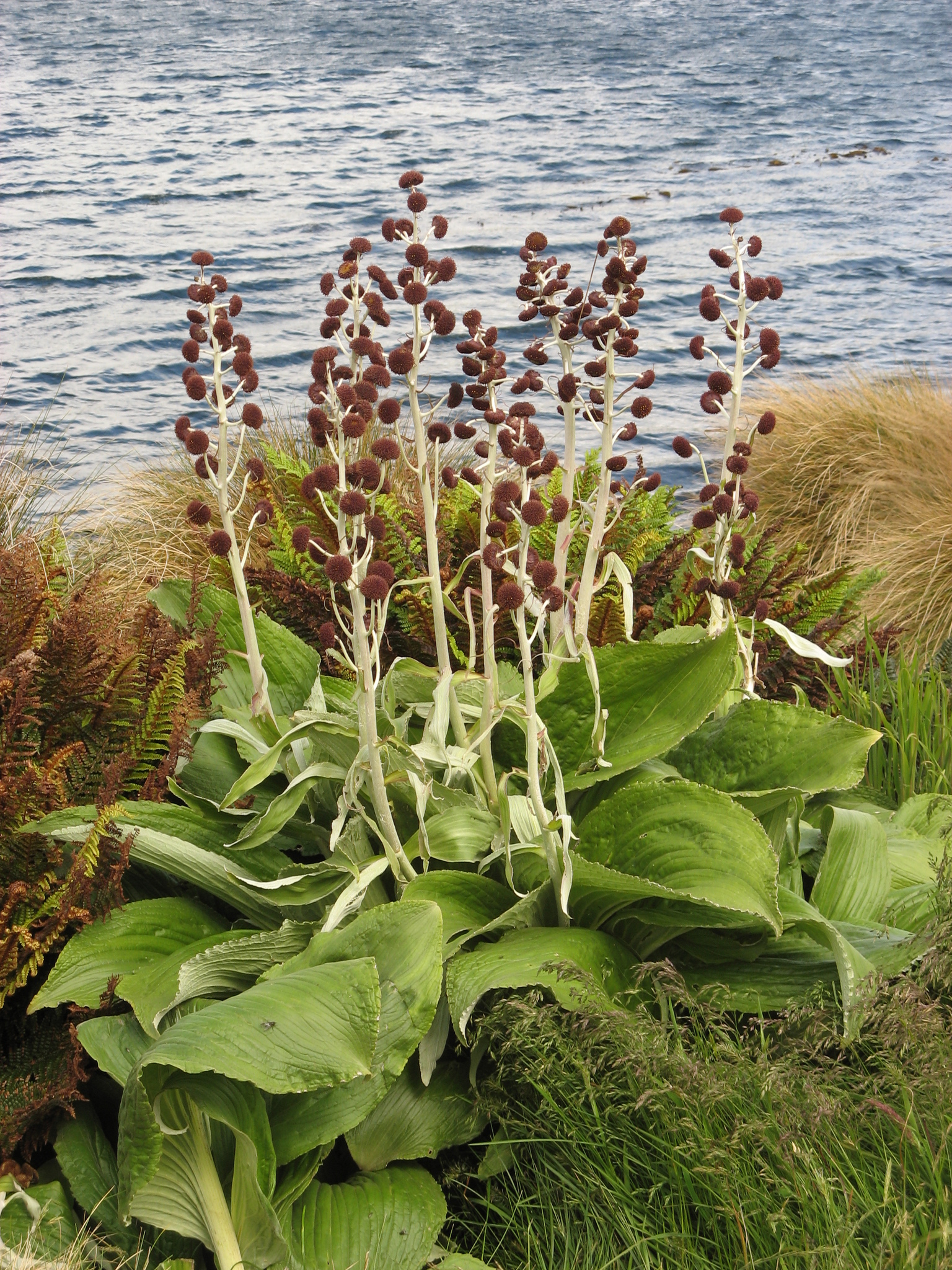
- Pleurophyllum criniferum found on Campbell Island / Motu Ihupuku

Conservation status
- Naturally Uncommon (NZ TCS)

Scientific classification
- Kingdom: Plantae
- Clade: Tracheophytes
- Clade: Angiosperms
- Clade: Eudicots
- Clade: Asterids
- Order: Asterales
- Family: Asteraceae
- Genus: Pleurophyllum
- Species: P. criniferum

Binomial name
- Pleurophyllum criniferum Hook.f.

Synonyms
- Pleurophyllum hombronii Decne; Albinia oresigenesa Homb. et Jacq. ex Decne; Pleurophyllum oresigenesum Decne.

= Pleurophyllum criniferum =

Species of plant

Pleurophyllum criniferum is a species of flowering plant in the family Asteraceae that is endemic to the subantarctic islands of New Zealand.

== Description ==
Pleurophyllum criniferum is a large perennial herb, growing up to 2 m (6 ft 7 in) in height. The leaves may grow to 1 metre (3 ft 3 in) or more in length and are diverse in shape, though usually oblong-ovate to lanceolate, the undersides covered by silky white hairs. The flowers occur as 15–30 heads in elongated racemes with short and inconspicuous ray-florets and dark purple disk-florets. The plant flowers from December to February and fruits from January to May.

== Distribution and habitat ==
The plant is endemic to New Zealand’s subantarctic Antipodes, Auckland and Campbell Islands, where it is a striking component of the megaherb community. It occurs from the coast up into the island ranges on peaty ground in herbfields.
