= Megaflora =

Large Plants

Megaflora (from Greek μέγας megas "large" and Neo-Latin flora "plant life") refers to an exceptionally large plant species; Jared Farmer defined the term as "the largest vascular plants of a particular region, habitat, or epoch". Examples of megaflora include the Sequoioideae of California, Pando (a large clonal organism of quaking aspen located in Utah), and a number of extinct plant species from the Mesozoic.

Megaflora (along with megafauna) are often seen as charismatic and have wide public appeal, making them particularly useful as the symbol or flagship species of conservation efforts.

== Culture ==
Most Proto-Indo-European mythologies feature megaflora in the form of a World Tree, a Tree-of-Life, axis mundi, or Sacred Tree. Some examples are the Ashvattha in Hindu mythology, Yggdrasil in Norse mythology, and égig érő fa in Hungarian mythology. Notable texts like the Epic of Gilgamesh and the Book of Genesis contain similar motifs, drawing inspiration from ancient iconography.

Often symbolizing rootedness, spirituality and fruitfulness, these plants have become central to the high fantasy and science fiction genres. The Two Trees of Valinor from The Lord of The Rings and the Hometrees of Avatar are two mainstream examples.

== Examples ==
Africa

- Adansonia digitata

Oceania

- Eucalyptus regnans

Eurasia

- Ficus benghalensis

Central and South America

- Ceroxylon quindiuense
- Puya raimondii
- Victoria amazonica

North America

- Sequoia sempervirens
- Sequoiadendron giganteum
- Picea sitchensis
- Pseudotsuga menziesii var. menziesii

Asia

- Shorea faguetiana
- Koompassia excelsa
- Rafflesia arnoldii
- Amorphophallus titanum

== See also ==
- Megafauna
- Megaherb
