= Megaherb =

New Zealand subantartic wildflowers

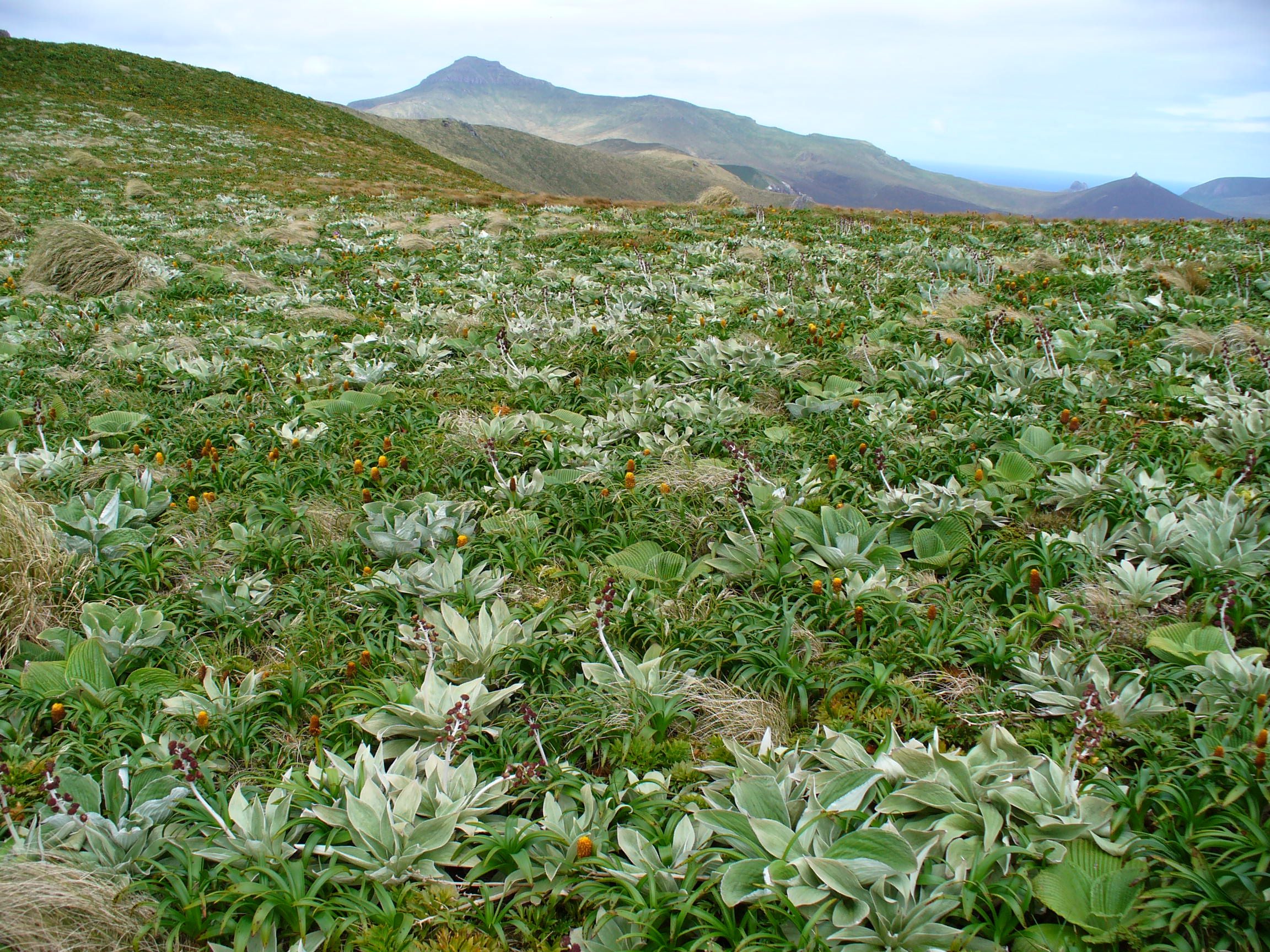
Megaherbs on Campbell Island

Megaherbs are a group of herbaceous wildflowers growing in the New Zealand Subantarctic Islands and on the other subantarctic islands. They are characterised by their great size, with huge leaves and very large and often unusually coloured flowers, which have evolved as an adaptation to the harsh weather conditions on the islands. They suffer from overgrazing due to introduced mammals.

== Appearance and occurrence ==
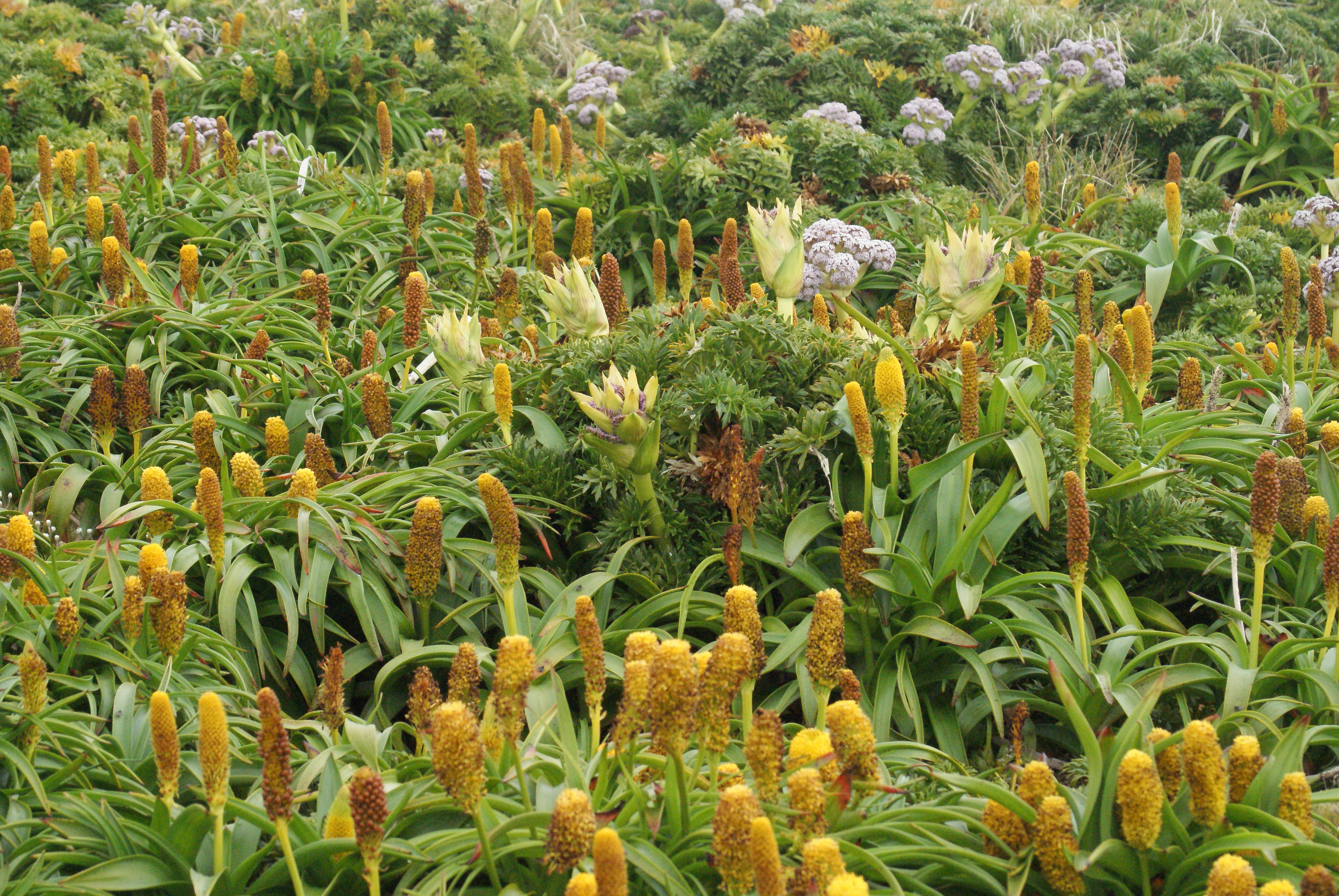
Close-up on megaherbs on Enderby Island

Originally, the term was coined to describe large-leaved herbs that form meadows in the subantarctic islands but has also been applied to describe tropical alpine vegetation forms found in the Andes, East Africa and New Guinea. They are large herbs that can reach dimensions of over 1 metre (3 ft 3 in), often feature strikingly colourful flowers, large leaves and long stalks, and are important components of the ecosystems of the subantarctic islands. Beyond these traits, megaherbs can have different forms; for example, some genera have perennial leaves and others are deciduous. Intensely coloured flowers are not unique to megaherbs but also occur on other plant species in the same environments and either arose by chance or are evolutionary adaptations to the environment.

They live in the wet, windy and cold environments of the subantarctic islands, where they coexist with cushion plants and tussock grasses but trees are absent. A single species, Pleurophyllum hookeri, covers almost a third of Macquarie Island where another megaherb, Azorella polaris, also occurs. They reach their maximum extent on that island. The only subantarctic islands lacking them are the Falklands and South Georgia, but Poa flabellata on South Georgia could be considered a megaherb. Typical settings are water-rich with fertile soils; sometimes they are associated with volcanic heat sources. On Campbell Island they appear to occur preferentially in nutrient-rich (eutrophic) terrain. Researchers since the 1940s often incorrectly assumed that they are limited to cliffs and ledges, as grazers had extirpated them from other areas.

The most extraordinary of the megaherbs is the Pleurophyllum meadow, a community dominated by the large-leafed herbaceous composite, producing a floral display second to none outside the tropics

— Joseph Dalton Hooker, quoted in Fell, 2002

They are the best known plants of the New Zealand Subantarctic Islands and are important components of the biodiversity of the region. Another name is "megaphyllous herbs".

== Taxa ==
Common taxa forming megaherbs are Asteraceae, Apiaceae, Araliaceae, Asphodelaceae, Boraginaceae, Brassicaceae, Gentianaceae and Liliaceae; sometimes Poaceae (grasses) are also included. In the New Zealand Subantarctic Islands, four endemic genera make up megaherbs. Among these are Anisotome and Bulbinella with colourful flowers and Azorella and Pleurophyllum with large leaves. Additional genera are Gentianella and Pringlea.

Noted megaherb species are the Campbell Island carrot (Anisotome latifolia) and the Ross lily (Bulbinella rossii). The Chatham Island forget-me-not (Myosotidium hortensia) naturally occurs on the Chatham Islands but has been brought to New Zealand. It has large leaves and forms rosettes up to one metre wide. The Kerguelen cabbage (Pringlea antiscorbutica) is a megaherb species that occurs on Heard Island where it is a key species in herbfields, the Crozet Islands, Kerguelen Islands and the Prince Edward Islands.

Other species called "megaherbs" include Phormium colensoi on New Zealand. The Mountain buttercup (Ranunculus lyallii) is also considered a megaherb and Astelia solandri has been referred to as one. The species Anisotome latifolia, Azorella spp., Bulbinella rossii, Myosotidium hortensia and Pleurophyllum spp. in the Chatham Islands have been referred to as "macrophyllous forbs". Angelica archangelica in Iceland has been considered an example of a Northern Hemisphere megaherb, and the tall-forb vegetation of Far Eastern Russia as a close analogue.

== Evolutionary history and ecology ==
The origins of the megaherb growth form are enigmatic. Several different subantarctic genera independently evolved this trait, which is defining for the genus Pleurophyllum. Azorella megaherbs evolved from ancestors with smaller leaves. These plants survived the Last Glacial Maximum on the subantarctic islands and spread northward after its end. Related species also occur on New Zealand.

Megaherbs have been described as a form of gigantism. The evolution of the megaherb form may be a consequence of specific conditions in the subantarctic islands. The large leaves could be intercepting nutrient-bearing aerosols and trap heat in cold environments. Rosette growths reduce wind speeds and wind-driven evaporation and cooling. The leaves may also act to absorb heat from diffuse radiation and higher temperatures have been measured in megaherbs than the surrounding environment. At the same time, the lack of herbivores, plentiful water, nutrients brought by seabirds, and steady temperatures facilitate the growth of large plants. On Adams Island megaherbs are well developed where they are fertilized by guano. In return, birds use them as cover and source of insects and are burrowed by nesting birds. Such burrowing may influence the establishment of megaherb communities. They are among the first plants to resettle former albatross nests on Adams Island. The simultaneous occurrence of large leaves, large underground storage tissues, large seeds and large seed output is also found in megaherbs and appears to reflect unusual adaptations, as resource trade-off would normally prohibit their simultaneous occurrence.

Herbs with large leaves occur in other places such as Chile, Hawaii, Kenya and New Zealand but there are traits specific for subantarctic megaherbs and there are environmental differences, such as lower and more steady insolation. Their evolution may be driven by similar environmental factors that are encountered on high mountains and in polar climates, such as cold and windy weather, and may thus be examples of convergent evolution.

Wētā, flightless crickets of New Zealand, have been observed to pollinate megaherbs and may constitute their main pollinators. Moths have also been observed pollinating megaherbs.

== Human history ==
Megaherbs were first described by the British botanist Joseph Dalton Hooker, who coined the term in 1847. Megaherbs draw the interest of scientists and tourists alike; they are the main claim to fame of Campbell Island for example. The Fairchilds Garden site on Adams Island was noted already in 1891 for its megaherbs. The characteristic appearance makes Pleurophyllum a plant that could be used in horticulture, but attempts to cultivate it outside of the subantarctic environment have largely been unsuccessful.

=== Threats ===
Megaherbs are susceptible to overgrazing by mammals. Feral pigs have devastated megaherb communities on Auckland Island. On Macquarie Island, rabbits consume megaherbs while rats cache seeds of Pleurophyllum hookeri in places unsuited for their germination, and the growth of the rabbit population has resulted in a major reduction of megaherb populations, as well as of other plant taxa of the island.

Where grazing animals have been removed, megaherb species often quickly reoccupy the terrain. This is expected to occur on Macquarie Island after rabbit and rodent populations began to shrink since 2010. They will probably displace less edible but also less competitive plant species like Polypogon magellanicus and Acaena magellanica. Conversely only a partial recovery took place on Campbell Island by 1994.

== Other uses of the term ==
The term "megaherb" is sometimes used to describe plant species from other continents that have features similar to subantarctic megaherbs. It has also been used to describe members of the family Heliconiaceae, which are tropical species, for the Amazonian species Phenakospermum guyannense, the Bushveld species Dracaena transvaalensis and the South African dryland genus Aloidendron.

== Gallery ==
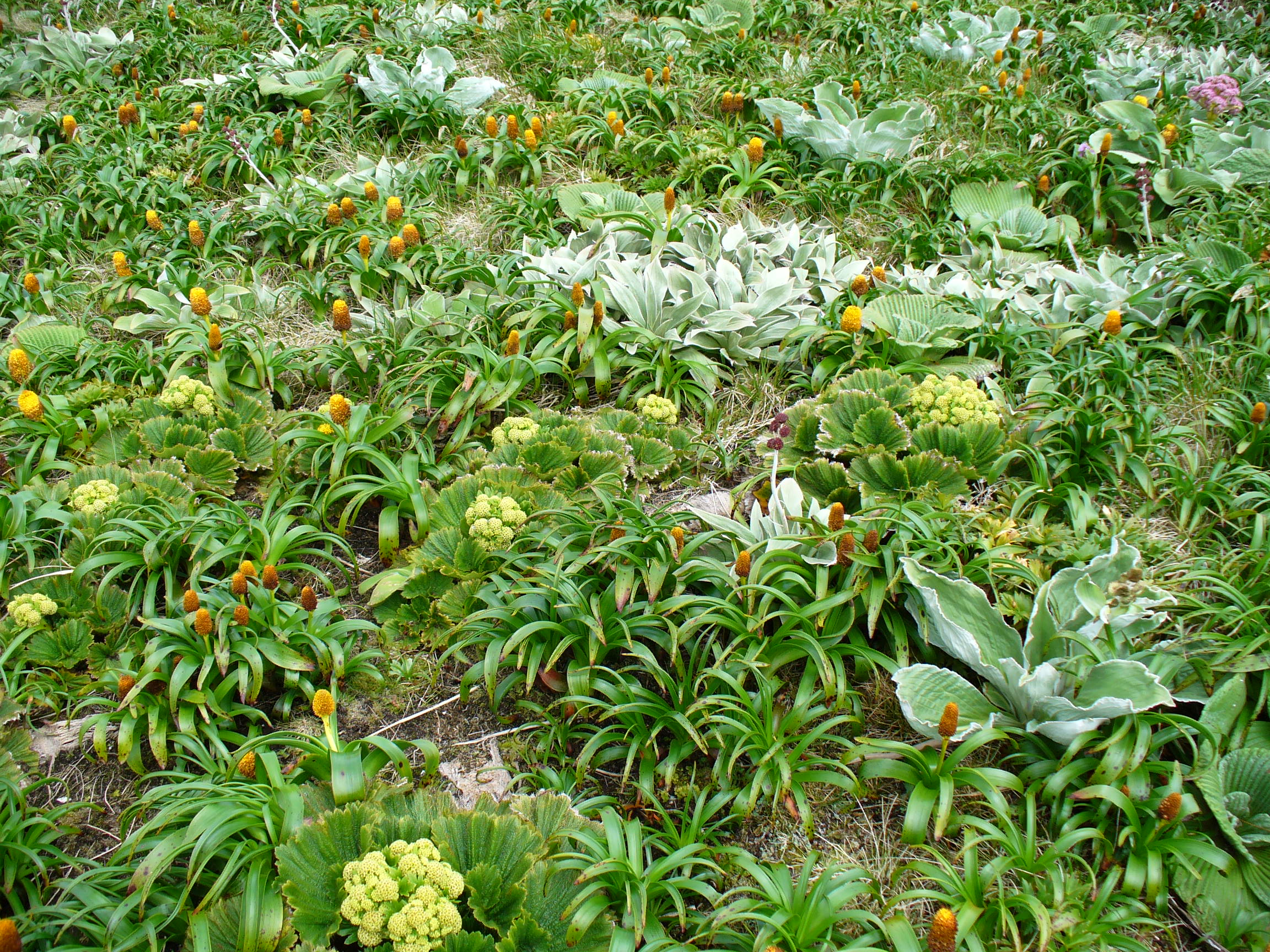
Bulbinella rossii, Azorella polaris, and two species of Pleurophyllum

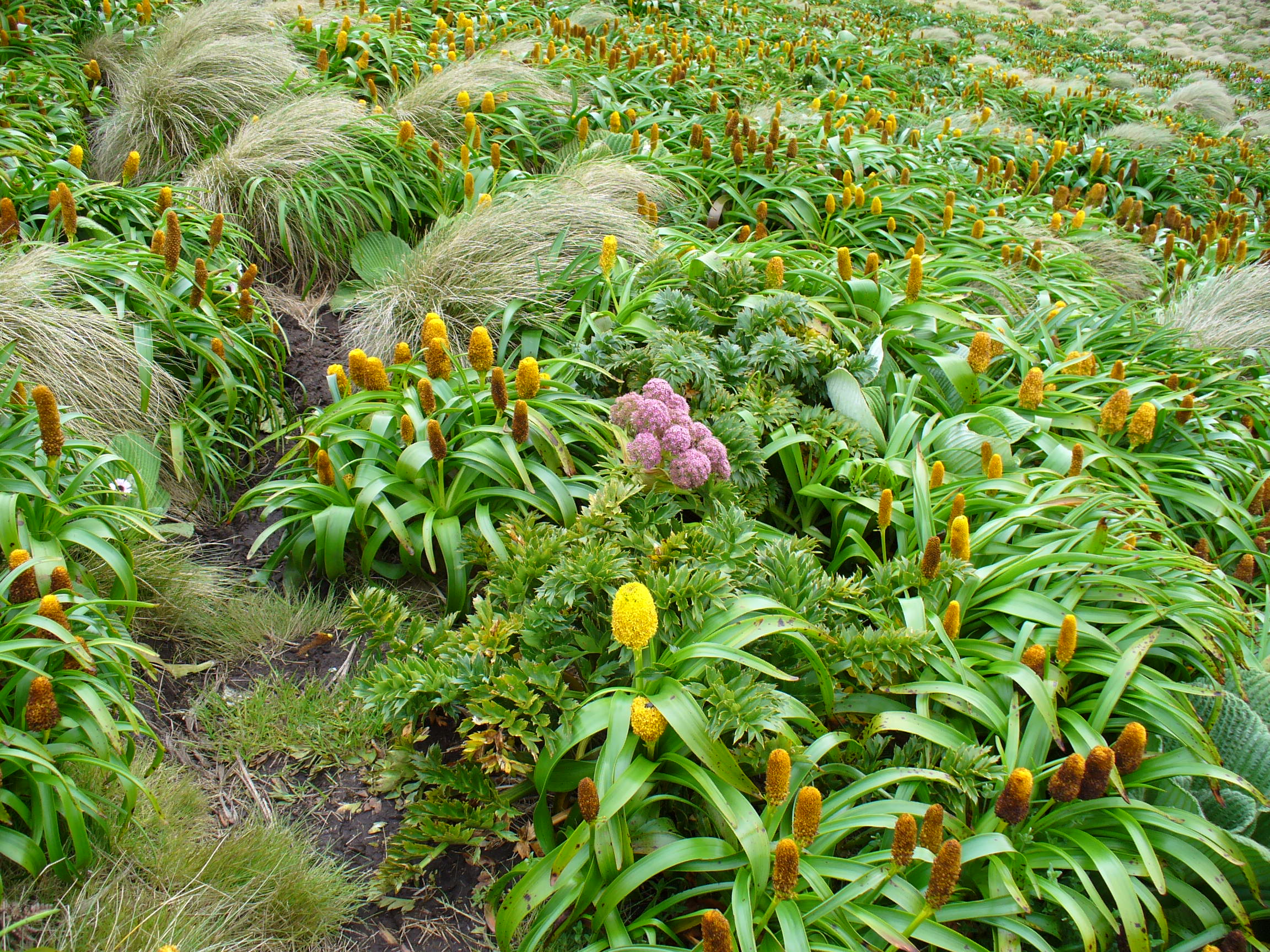
B. rossii, Anisotome latifolia, and Pleurophyllum

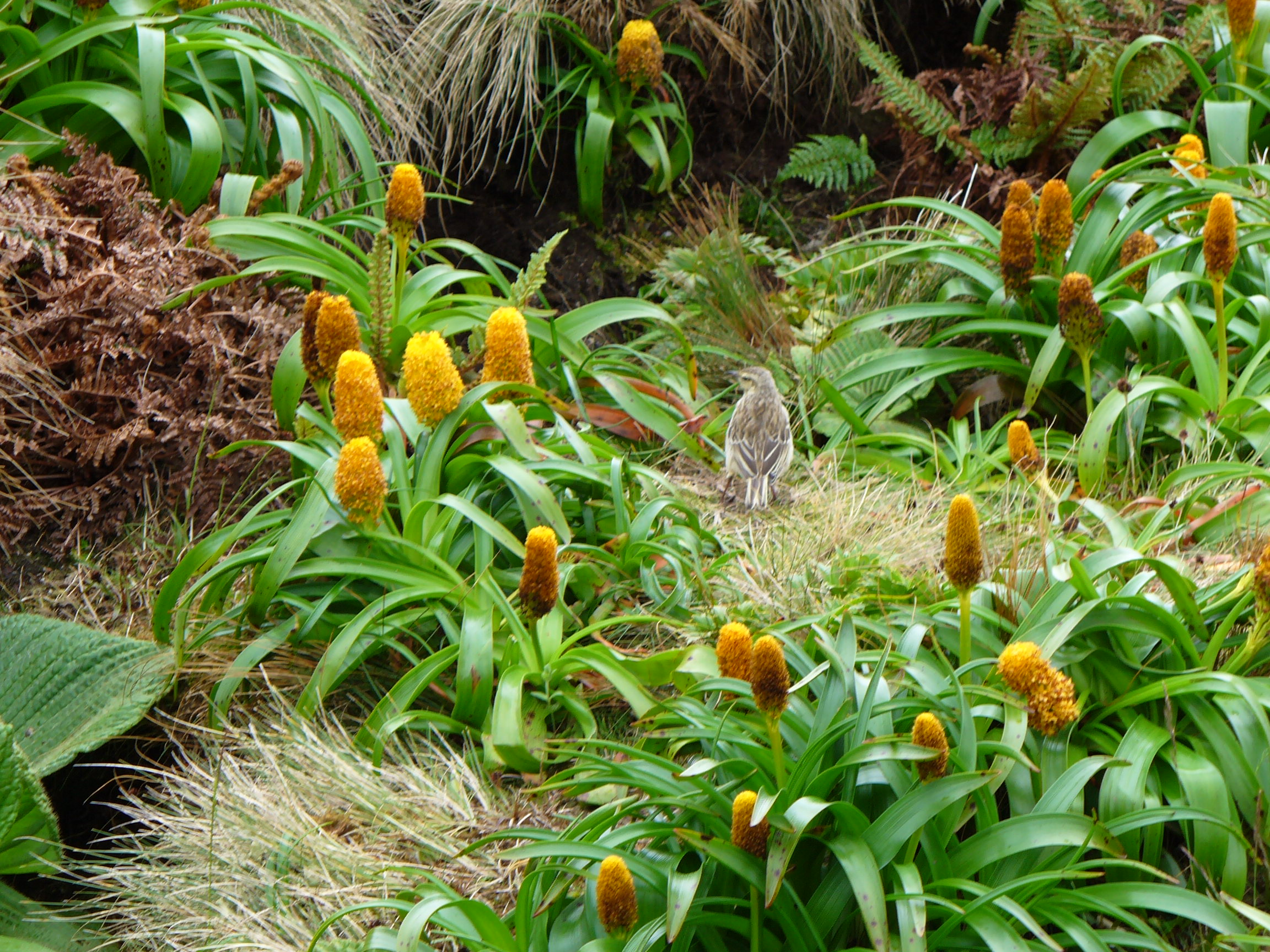
B. rossii

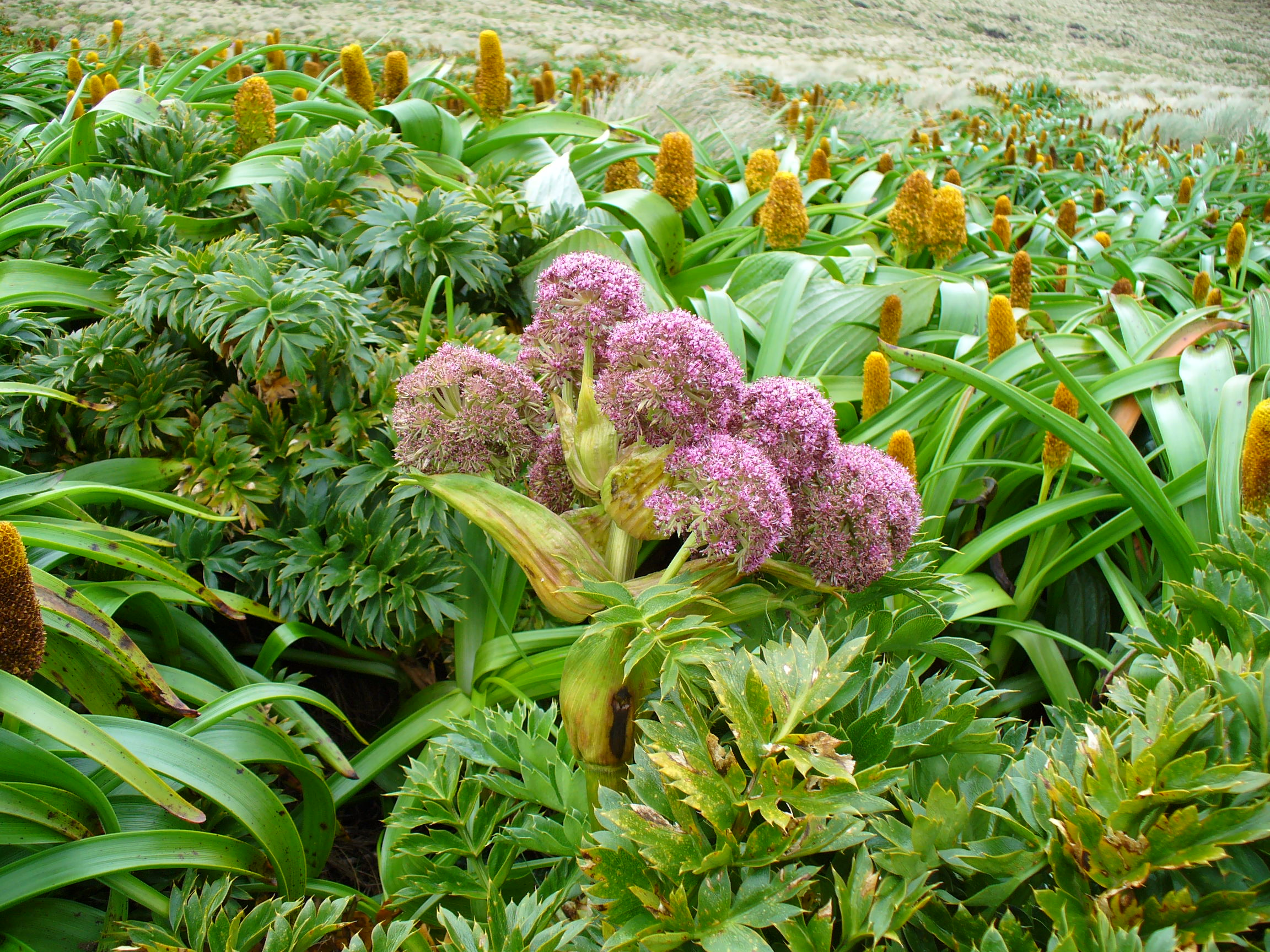
A. latifolia and B. rossii

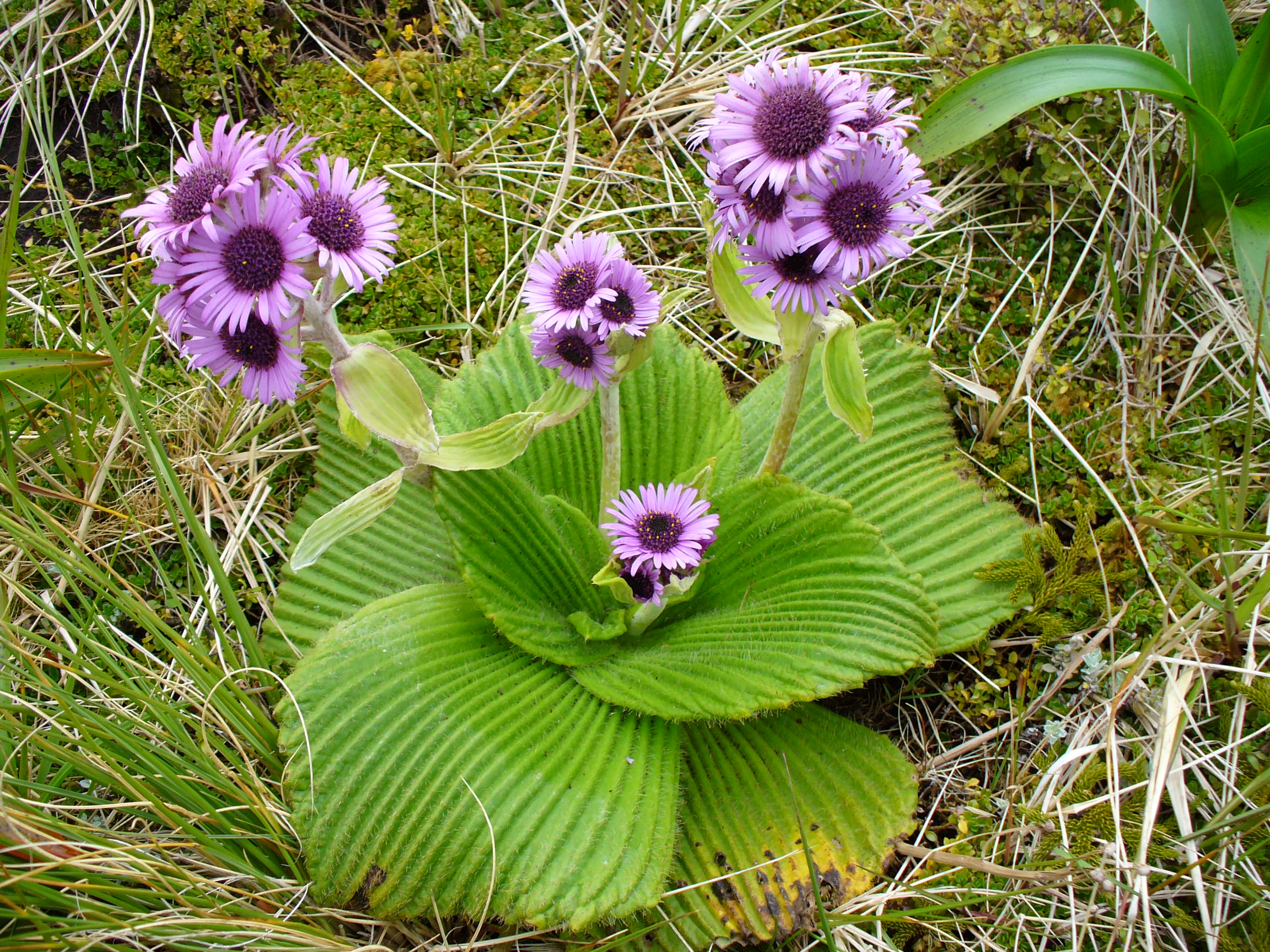
Pleurophyllum speciosum, the Campbell Island daisy

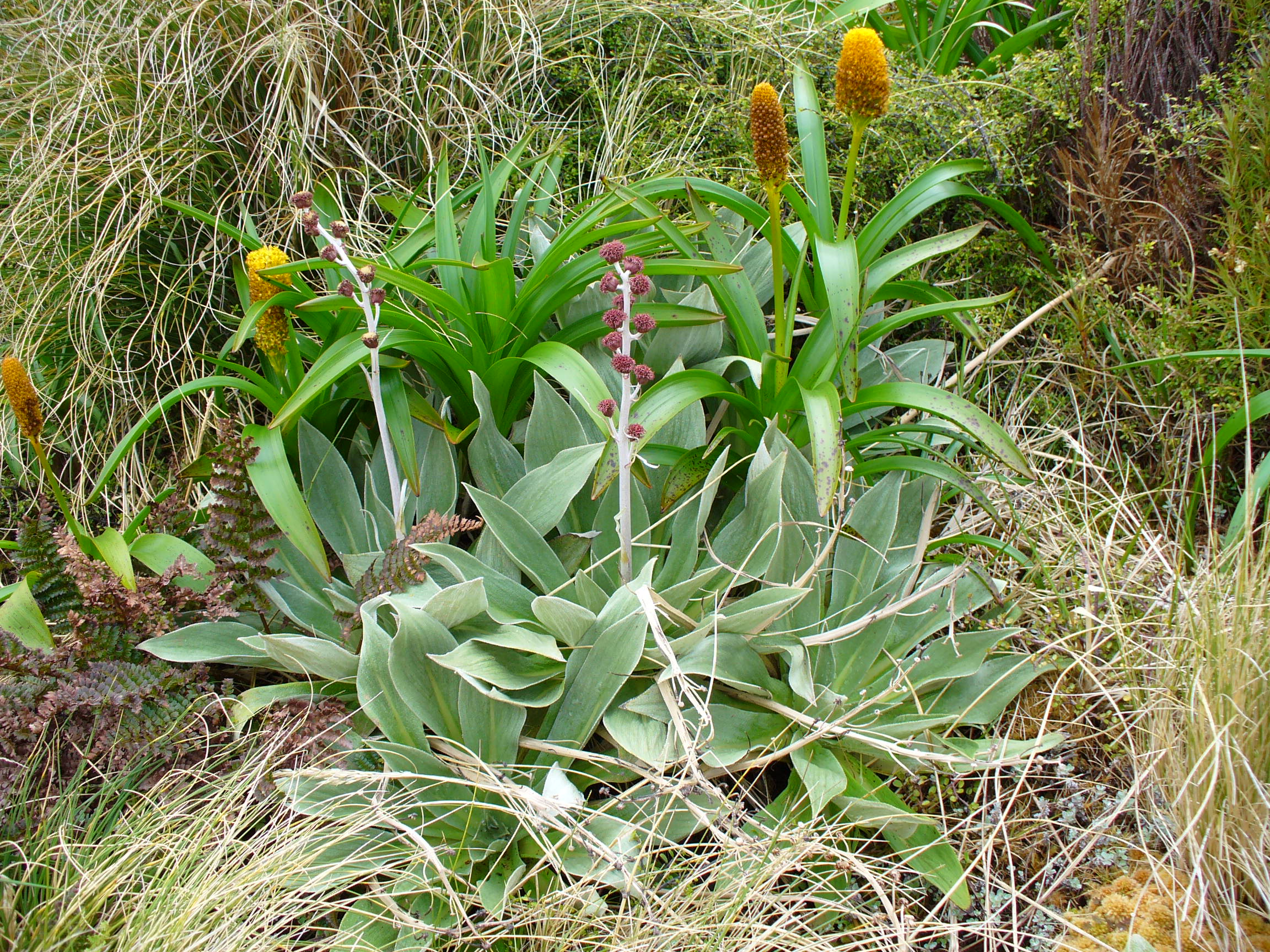
Pleurophyllum hookeri and B. rossii

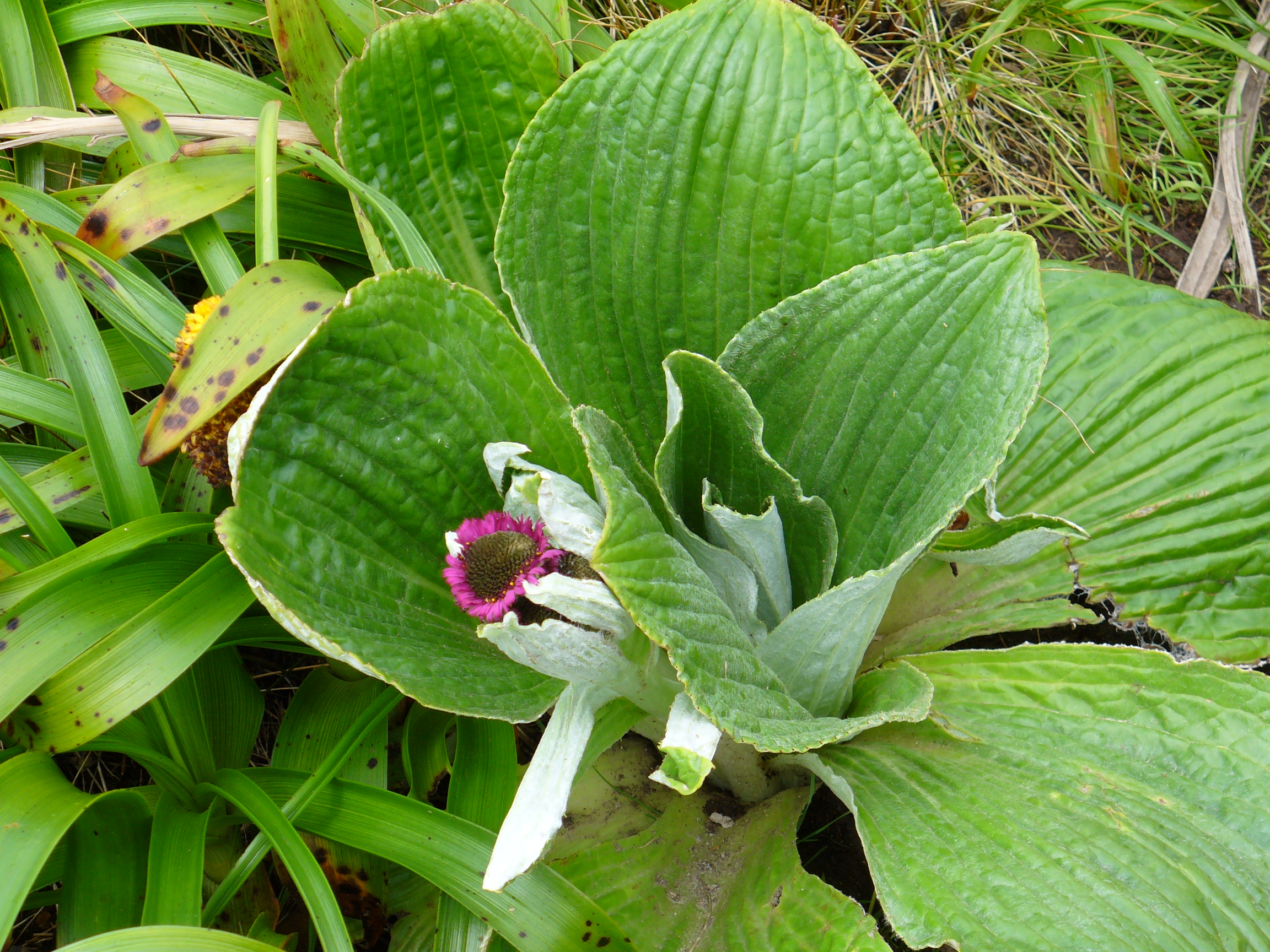
A hybrid between P. hookeri and P. speciosum

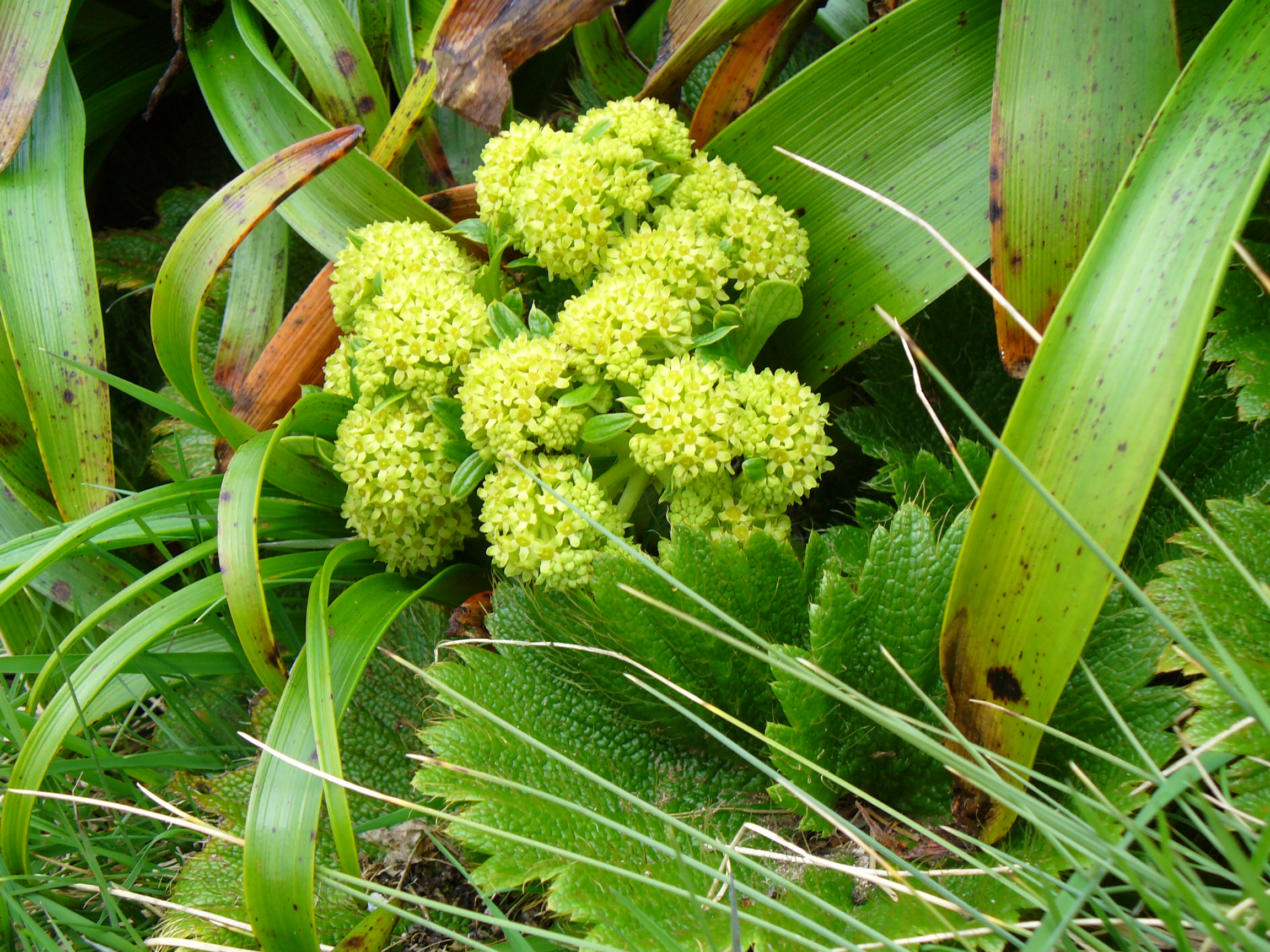
A. polaris and B. rossii

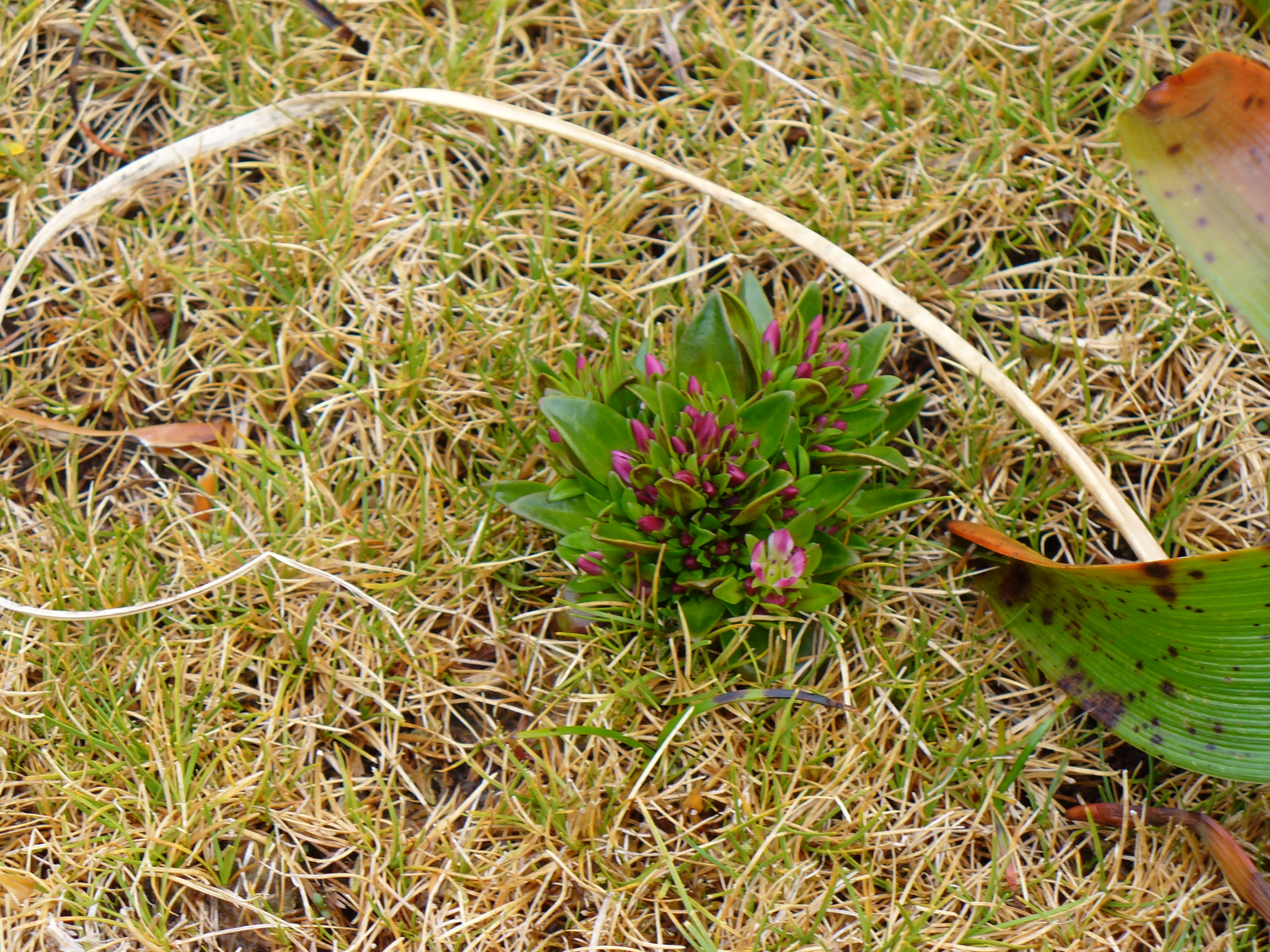
Gentianella antarctica

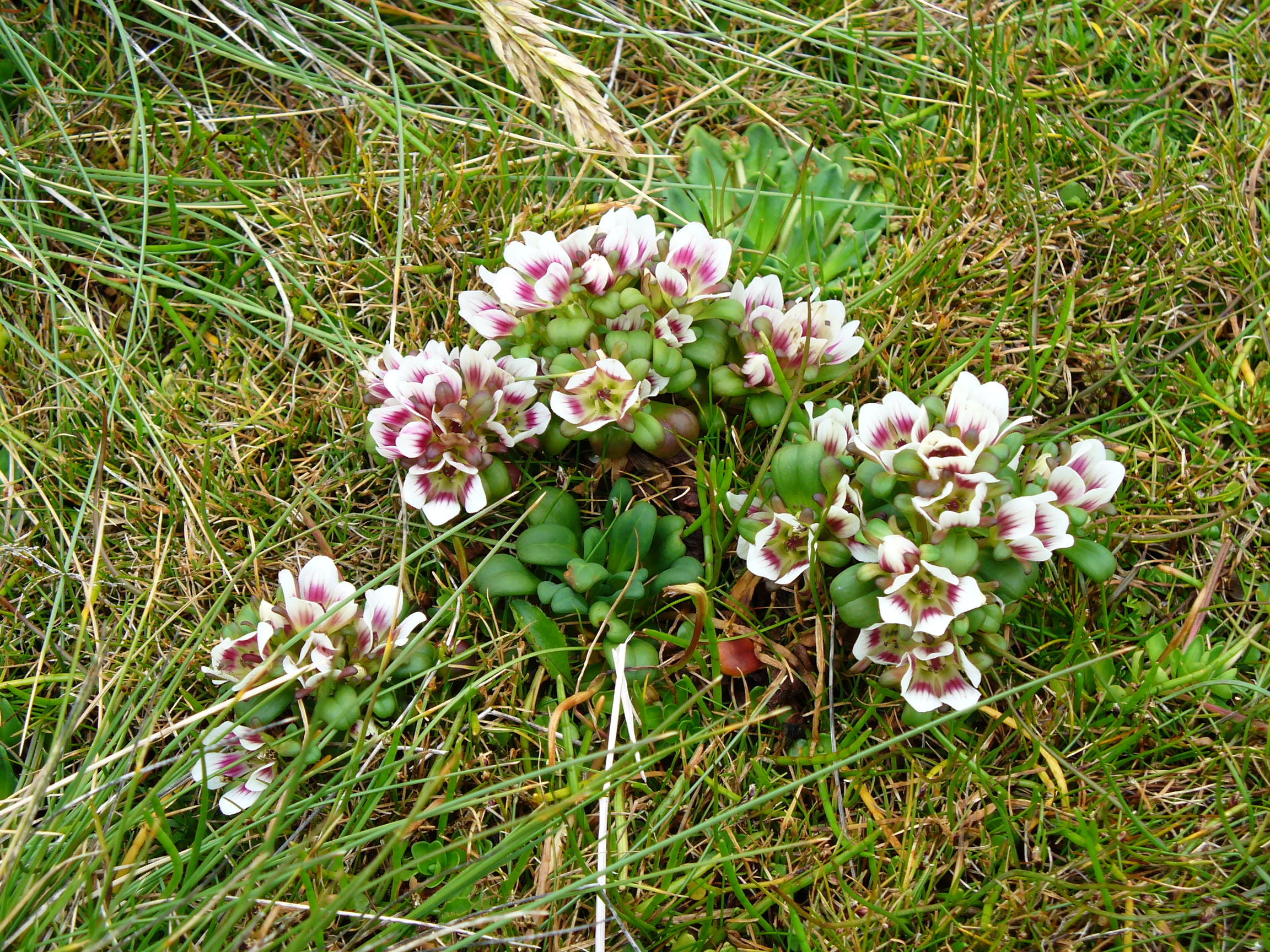
Gentianella concinna

== See also ==
- Island gigantism
- Antarctic Floristic Kingdom
- Antarctic flora
- Megafauna
- Megaflora
