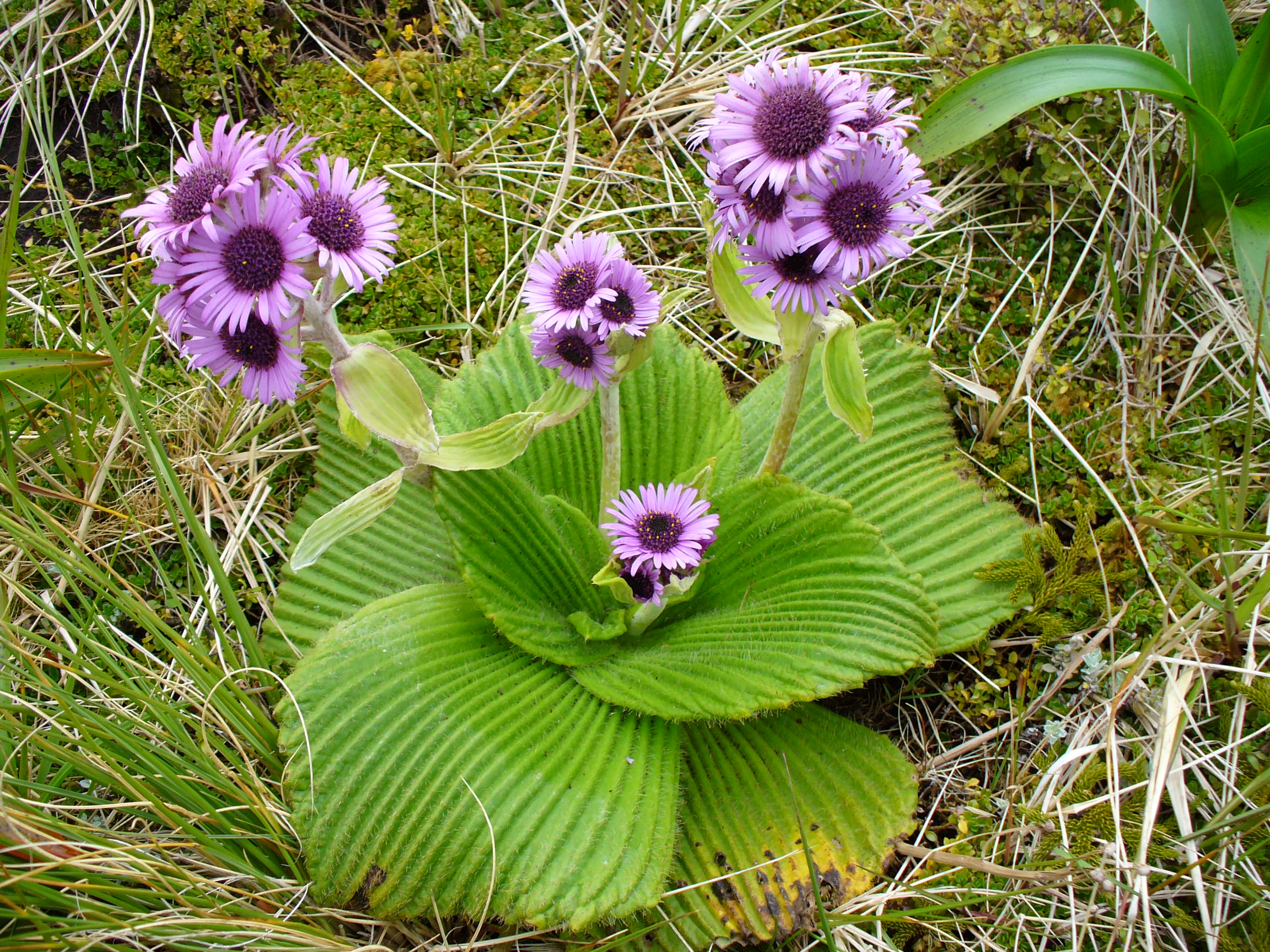

Conservation status
- Naturally Uncommon (NZ TCS)

Scientific classification
- Kingdom: Plantae
- Clade: Tracheophytes
- Clade: Angiosperms
- Clade: Eudicots
- Clade: Asterids
- Order: Asterales
- Family: Asteraceae
- Genus: Pleurophyllum
- Species: P. speciosum

Binomial name
- Pleurophyllum speciosum Hook.f.

= Pleurophyllum speciosum =

Species of plant

Pleurophyllum speciosum, also known as the giant emperor daisy or Campbell Island daisy, is a megaherb native to the Auckland and Campbell Islands of New Zealand. A false colour image is depicted on the lower left corner on the reverse of the current five dollar New Zealand banknote. The Campbell Island daisy was first described by Joseph Dalton Hooker in Flora Antarctica of 1844, after he had collected it during the Ross expedition.

== Conservation status ==
In both 2009 and 2012 it was deemed to be "At Risk - Naturally Uncommon" under the New Zealand Threat Classification System, and this New Zealand classification was reaffirmed in 2018 (due to its restricted range).
