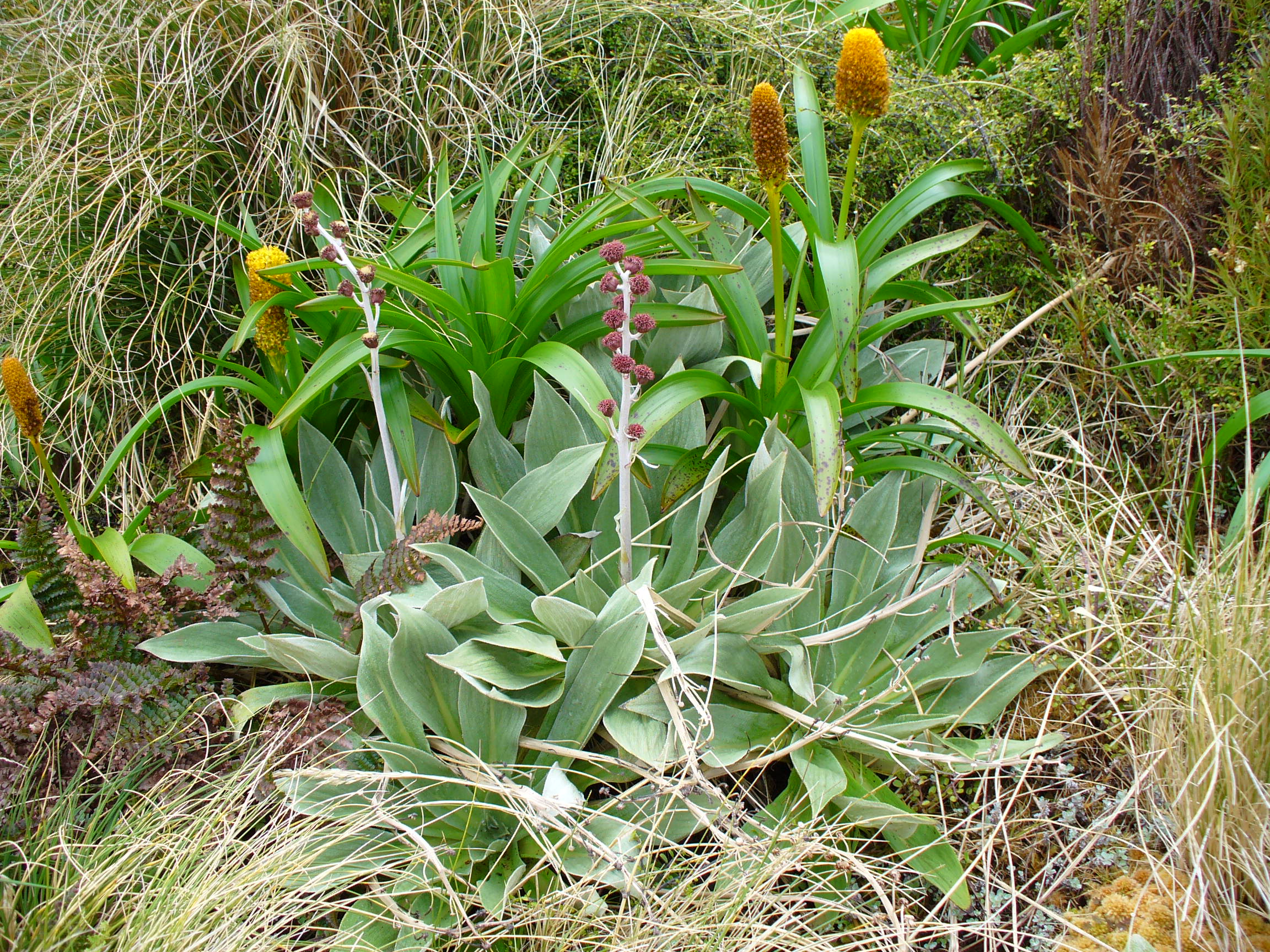
- Flowering Pleurophyllum hookeri (foreground) on Campbell Island; the yellow-flowers in the background are of Bulbinella rossii

Conservation status
- Naturally Uncommon (NZ TCS)

Scientific classification
- Kingdom: Plantae
- Clade: Tracheophytes
- Clade: Angiosperms
- Clade: Eudicots
- Clade: Asterids
- Order: Asterales
- Family: Asteraceae
- Genus: Pleurophyllum
- Species: P. hookeri

Binomial name
- Pleurophyllum hookeri Buch.

= Pleurophyllum hookeri =

Species of plant

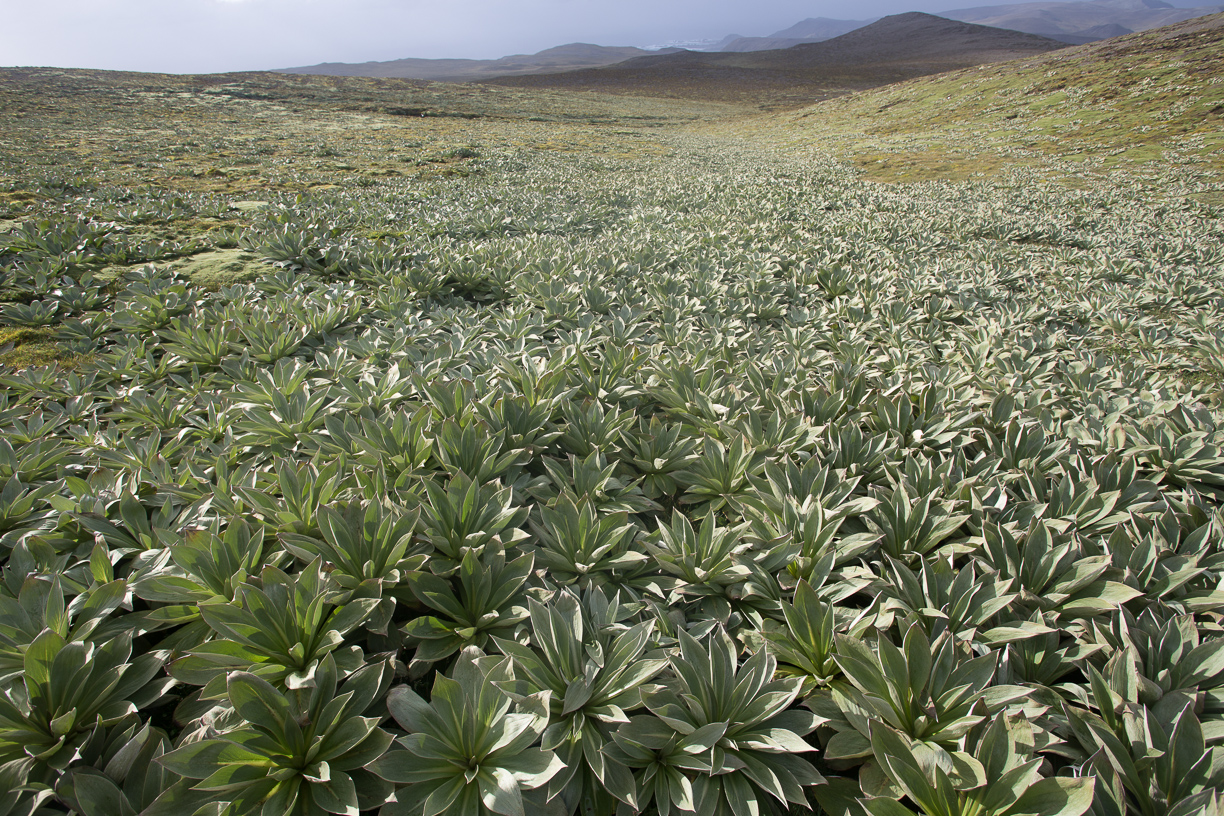
Highland herbfield on Macquarie Island dominated by the silver-leafed Pleurophyllum hookeri.

Pleurophyllum hookeri, also known as the silver-leaf daisy or sage-green rosette herb, is a herbaceous plant in the family Asteraceae, a megaherb native to the subantarctic Auckland and Campbell Islands of New Zealand and Australia’s Macquarie Island. It grows up to 900 mm in height and has crimson button flowers and long, silky, silver leaves, with a large carrot-like tuber and long roots. It also has the unusual feature of a vertically contractile stem, most of which is underground, which serves to keep the leaf rosette close to the ground surface and the plant anchored securely against the very strong winds typical of subantarctic islands. Prior to the successful eradication of introduced mammals on Macquarie Island in 2011, it had been threatened there by black rats and European rabbits.
