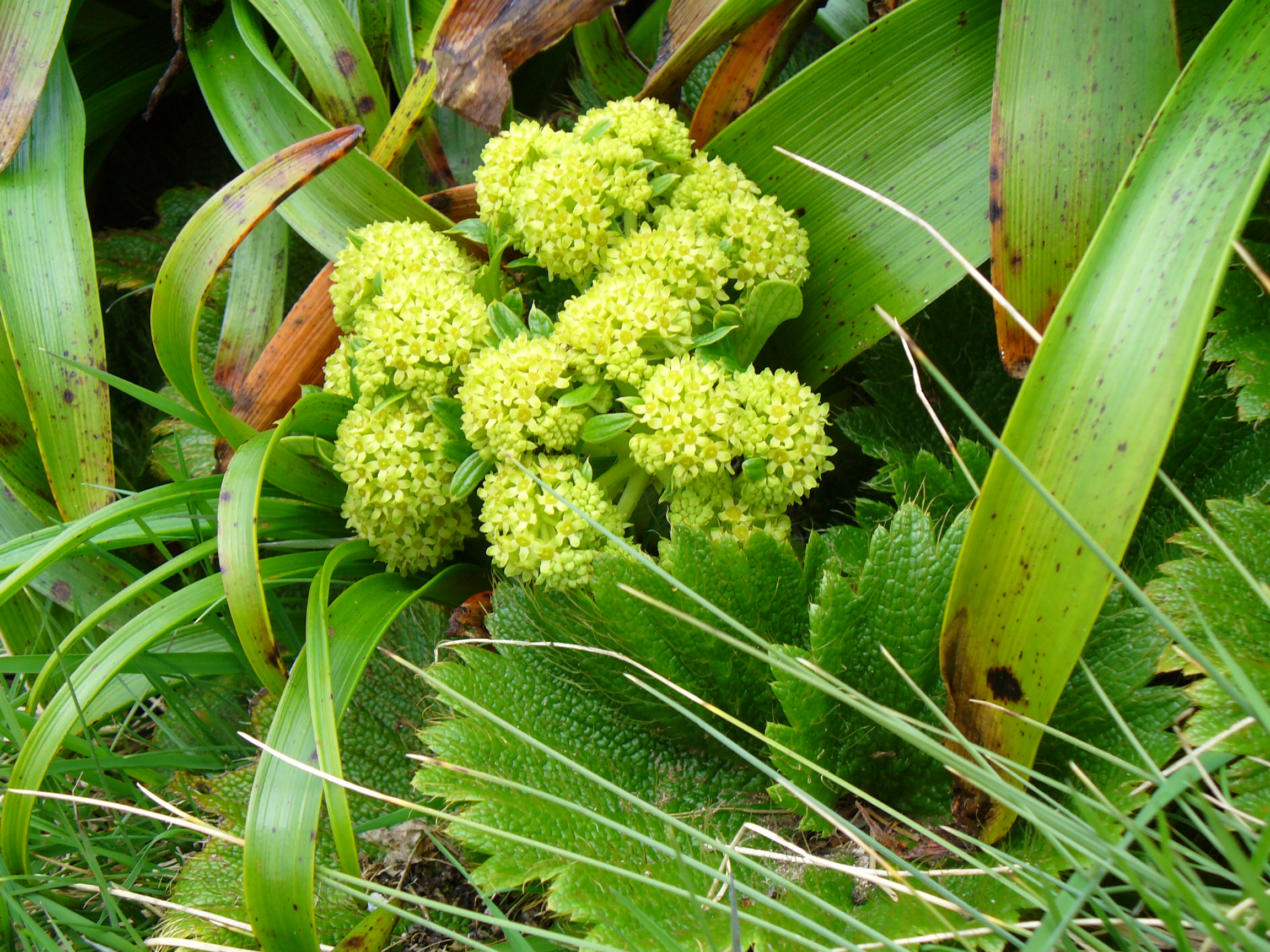
- Azorella polaris on Campbell Island

Conservation status
- Naturally Uncommon (NZ TCS)

Scientific classification
- Kingdom: Plantae
- Clade: Tracheophytes
- Clade: Angiosperms
- Clade: Eudicots
- Clade: Asterids
- Order: Apiales
- Family: Apiaceae
- Genus: Azorella
- Species: A. polaris

Binomial name
- Azorella polaris (Hombr. & Jacquinot) G.M.Plunkett & A.N.Nicolas (2016)

Synonyms
- Aralia polaris Hombr. & Jacquinot (1843); Stilbocarpa polaris (Hombr. & Jacquinot) A.Gray (1854)

= Azorella polaris =

Species of flowering plant

Azorella polaris, commonly known as the Macquarie Island cabbage, is a species of flowering plant usually placed in the family Araliaceae or Apiaceae and only very distantly related to cabbage. It is a megaherb, growing up to about a metre in height, native to the subantarctic islands of New Zealand and to Australia's Macquarie Island.

== Taxonomy ==
Azorella polaris is a species of flowering plant in the family Apiaceae. A plate of Azorella polaris (Hombr. & Jacq.) G. M. Plunkett & A. N. Nicolas was published in 1843 as Aralia polaris by French naturalist Jacques Bernard Hombron and Dutch botanist Nikolaus Joseph von Jacquin. But they did not provide a description. The original description of the species was provided by Joseph Dalton Hooker in his Flora Antarctica in 1844. The species was transferred to the genus Stilbocarpa in 1854 by American botanist Asa Gray. Finally, in 2016, American botanists Gregory Plunkett and Antoine Nicolas transferred the species to the genus Azorella.

Azorella polaris is closely related to two other subantarctic species, Azorella robusta and Azorella lyallii.

== Description ==
A. polaris is a large, herbaceous, rosette plant ("megaherb") up to 2 m tall and 2 m in diameter. It has branched stems and thick, fleshy rhizomes up to 4 cm thick. The leaves have long hairy petioles up to 60 cm long, and bright green, toothed leaf blades with prominent veins that are 20–35 cm long by 30–45 cm wide, suborbicular-reniform, fleshy, and very hairy with appressed hairs that are 1–2 cm long, or sometimes almost hairless on the underside. The flowers are arranged in compound, axillary and terminal umbels that can be up to 30 cm in diameter. The umbels are at the tips of hairy peduncles 10–15 cm long. Each flower is borne on a pedicel up to 1 cm long with entire bracts. The numerous flowers are about 5 mm wide, with waxy, yellow petals with a purple base. Fruits are subglobose, shiny, and 4–6 mm wide.

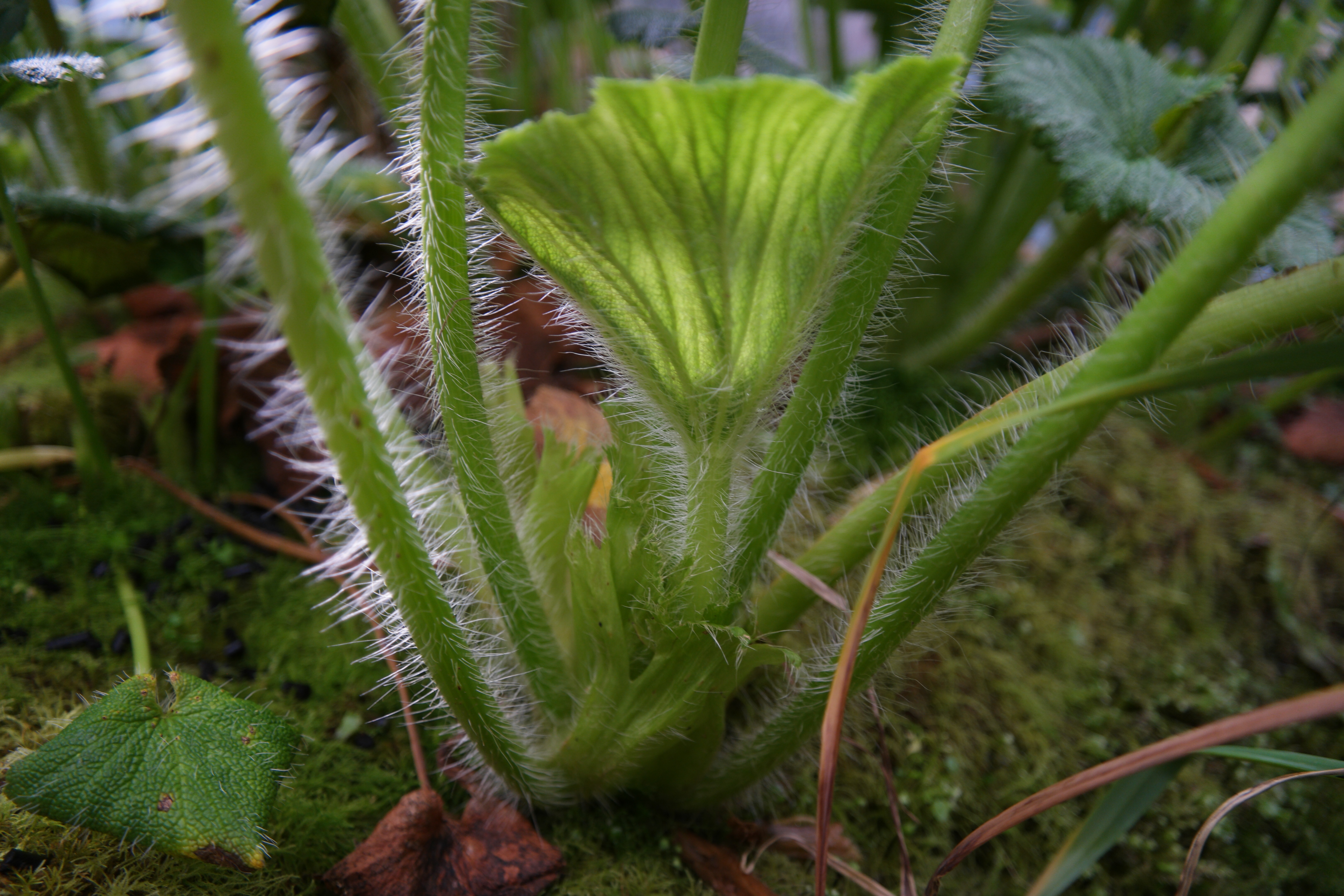
Hairs on leaf petioles of A. polaris

A. polaris has fruits mainly from November to February, but sometimes in October or March.

== Breeding system ==
Flowers are co-sexual, protandrous and dichogamous, meaning each umbel presents either stigmas or pollen. There is only circumstantial evidence that the species is self-compatible. Small flies are likely the pollinators.

== Distribution and habitat ==
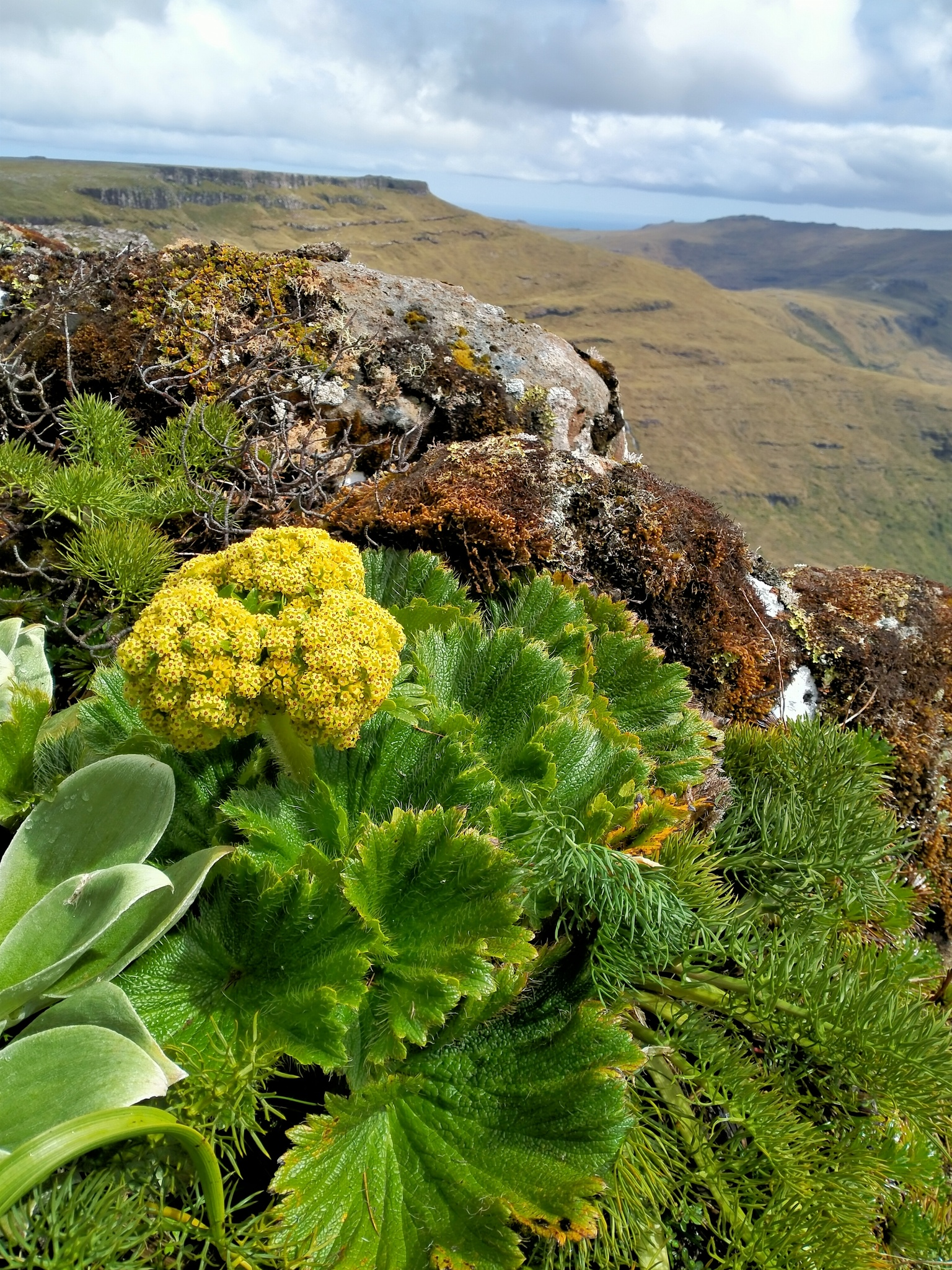
A. polaris above the tree line on Auckland Island

A. polaris is native to two subantarctic island groups of New Zealand, Campbell Island and Auckland Islands, as well as the Australian subantarctic island, Macquarie Island.

On Macquarie Island, A. polaris is part of the dominant vegetation. Many species of myxomycetes were found on A. polaris and another megaherb, Pleruophyllum hookeri, as these species are the primary substrates available for slime moulds.

== Relationship with humans ==
A. polaris was used as a food source and a scurvy preventative by early explorers and sealers. It was eaten by the survivors of the 1907 shipwreck of the Dundonald on Disappointment Island.

== Conservation status ==
It is classified as "At Risk — Naturally Uncommon" in the New Zealand Threat Classification System, with the qualifiers CD (Conservation Dependent), PD (Partial Decline), RR (Range Restricted), SO (Secure Overseas).

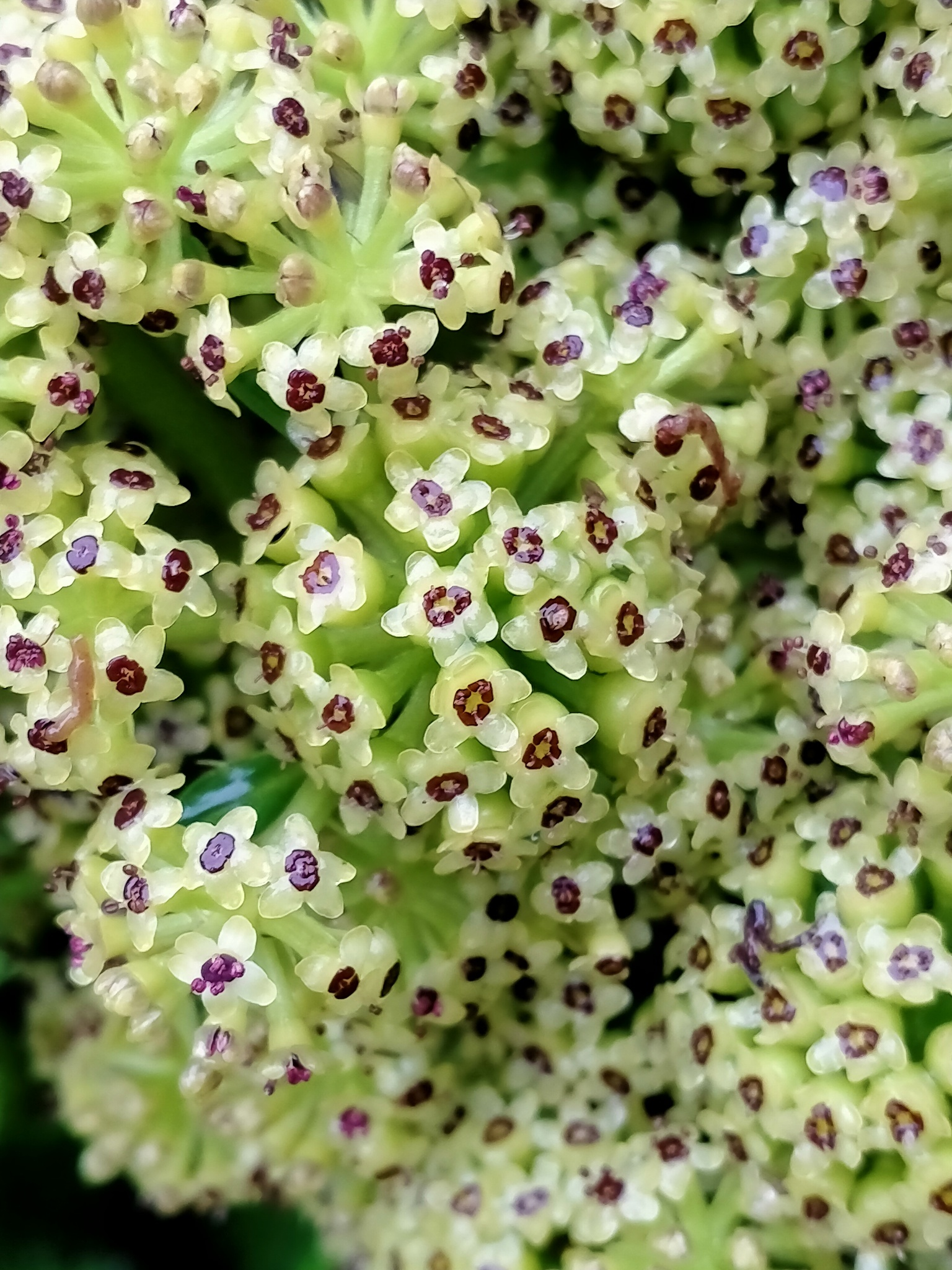
Close-up of flowers

Azorella polaris is extremely palatable and vulnerable to several introduced mammals to the subantarctic islands. Prior to the eradication of feral goats on Auckland Island, goat gut samples showed that Azorella polaris was one of the most palatable and preferred plants that the goats ate there, together with species of Anisotome and Pleurophyllum. On Enderby Island, A. polaris was restricted to inaccessible cliffs but recovered to other areas of the island after cattle were removed. Similarly, there was a significant recovery of A. poliaris and other subantarctic megaherbs and grasses in range, abundance, and individual plant size for subantarctic megaherbs on Campbell Island after sheep were removed. On Macquarie Island, the species was threatened by introduced black rats and European rabbits, until their eradication in 2011.
