= Auckland Island =

Island off Southern New Zealand

Mauka Huka (Māori)
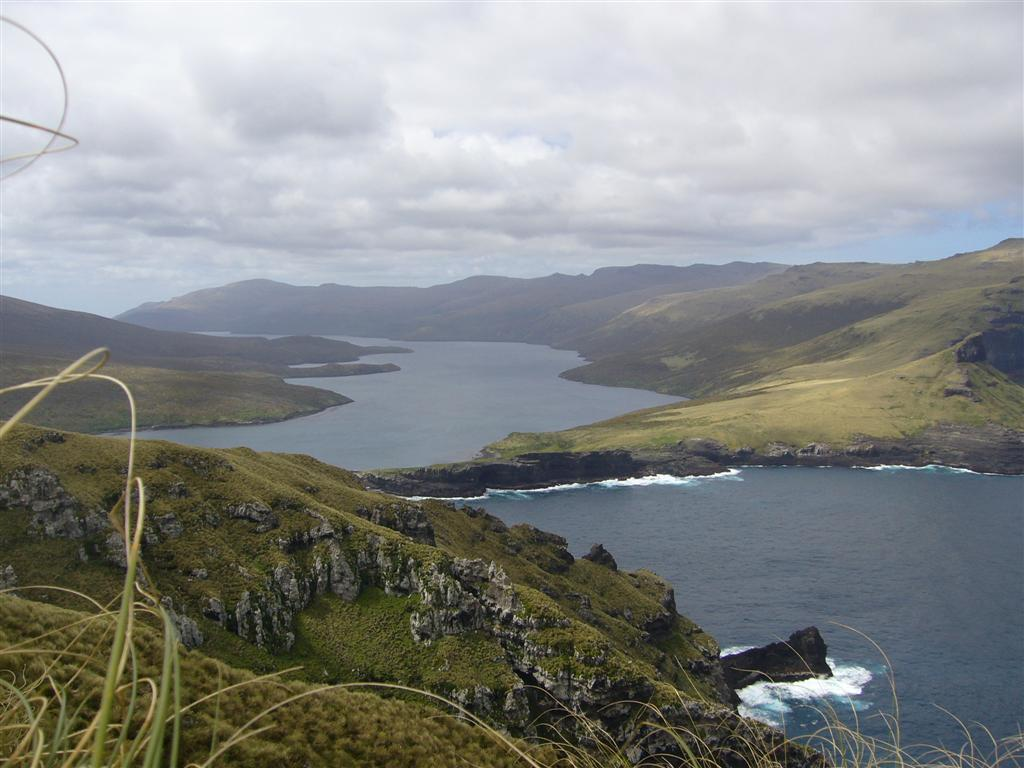
- Carnley Harbour and Adams Island

- Location within Oceania

Geography
- Coordinates: 50.69°S 166.08°E
- Archipelago: Auckland Islands
- Area: 442.5 km^{2} (170.9 sq mi)
- Length: 42 km (26.1 mi)
- Width: 26 km (16.2 mi)
- Highest elevation: 659 m (2162 ft)
- Highest point: Cavern Peak

Administration
- New Zealand

Demographics
- Population: 0 (2020)

Auckland Island (Māori: Mauka Huka) is the main island of the eponymous uninhabited archipelago in the South Pacific Ocean. It is part of the New Zealand subantarctic area. It is inscribed in the UNESCO World Heritage list together with the other New Zealand Subantarctic Islands in the region.

== Geography ==
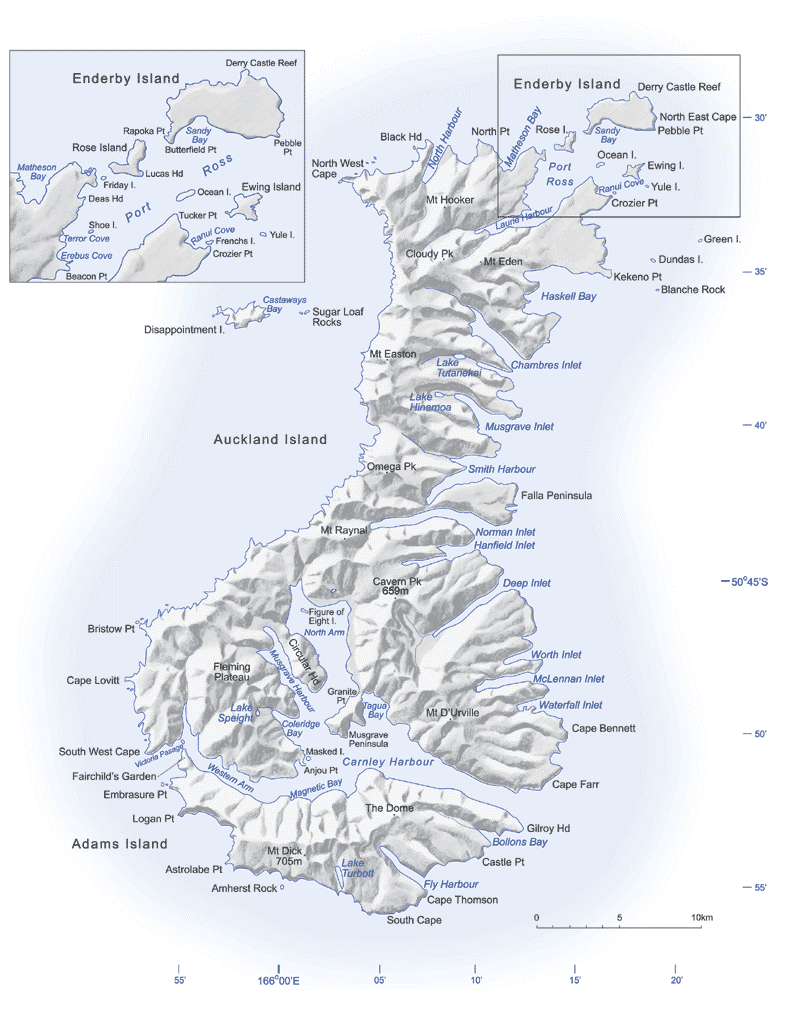
Map of Auckland Island

The island has a land area of about 442.5 km^{2} (170.9 sq mi), and is 42 kilometres (26 mi) long. It was formed 25 to 10 million years ago from a huge volcanic pile which formed two domes – one centred around Carnley Harbour in the south and another (the Ross Dome) around Disappointment Island to the west. The island is made of volcanic scoria, blanketed in over 2m of peat. It is notable for its steep cliffs and rugged terrain, which rises to over 600 m (1,969 ft). Prominent peaks include Cavern Peak, at 659 m or 2,162 ft; Mount Raynal, at 635 m or 2,083 ft; Mount D'Urville, at 630 m or 2,067 ft; Mount Easton, at 610 m or 2,001 ft; and the Tower of Babel, at 550 m or 1,804 ft.

The southern end of the island broadens to a width of 26 kilometres (16 mi), encompassing Carnley Harbour. At the western side a very narrow channel known as Victoria Passage separates the main island from the smaller Adams Island. Adams Island and the southern part of the main island form the crater rim; three kilometres (1.9 mi) north of Carnley Harbour's mouth lies Cape Lovitt, the westernmost point of New Zealand.

== Flora ==
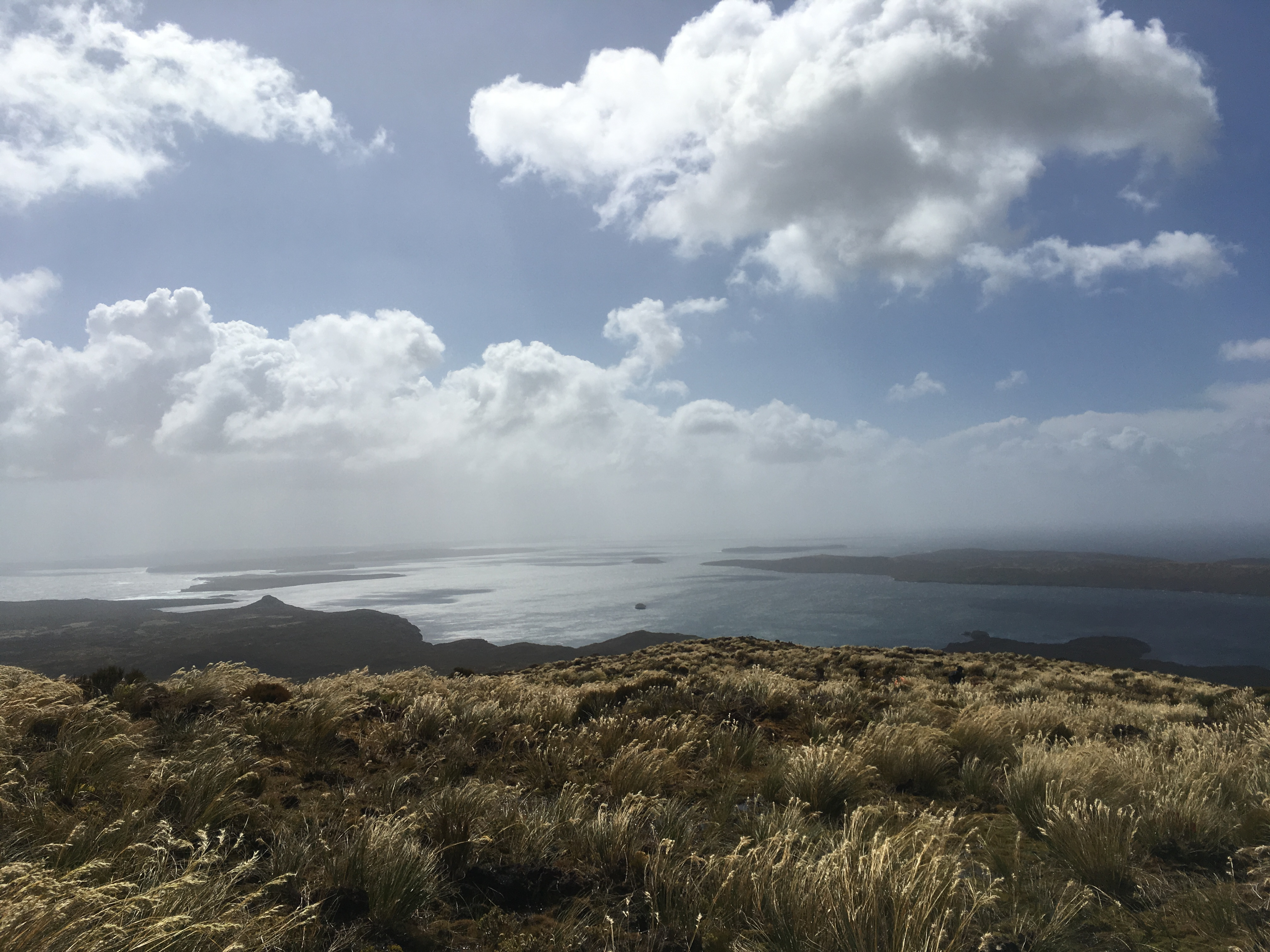
Auckland looking north over Deas Head towards Rose- and Enderby Island

There are distinct vegetation zones. There is a band of Southern rātā Metrosideros umbellata around the coast apart from on the western side, the height of which is determined by the shelter, aspect and degree of the slope. The rātā forest may extend into the Chionochloa tussock grasslands but in most places merges into a thick band of low, tight scrub dominated by Dracophyllum longifolium, Ozothamnus vauvilliersii and Myrsine divaricata. This scrub band is almost impenetrable and in places is dense enough to walk on top of.

An expedition report from 1907 describes the scrub thusly:

The subalpine scrub at 400 ft. made our advance extremely toilsome, the thick masses of Suttonia divaricata scrub had to be cut through before any progress could be made. Throughout our stay on the island this scrub was one of the worst drawbacks we had to encounter; from four to six feet high it is quite impassable with reasonable exertion; walking on the top can be undertaken only by a very light man. Only with the severest exertion can it be pushed aside to enable a man to pass, crawling under it is out of the question.

The scrub band breaks into patches and transitions into extensive grassland of Chionochloa antarctica which in turn merges into a sparsely vegetated fellfield community on the most exposed alpine areas. The megaherbs Anisotome antipoda, Anisotome latifolia, Bulbinella rossii, Pleurophyllum criniferum, Pleurophyllum hookeri, Pleurophyllum speciosum and Stilbocarpa polaris were historically found from the coast into the alpine, however the distribution and populations of these species have been severely impacted by the actions of introduced pigs.

== Marine mammals ==
Port Ross at the north end of Auckland Island is the only breeding site for the New Zealand population of southern right whales. Up to 400 may be found in the harbour during the winter months, and are regularly surveyed by the University of Otago.

A breeding population of New Zealand sea lions is found on the island. 80% of the total population live and breed in the archipelago. The New Zealand Department of Conservation has conducted an annual survey of the population on the islands since 1994.

== Bird life ==
The island is part of the Auckland Island group Important Bird Area (IBA), identified as such by BirdLife International because of the significance of the group as a breeding site for several species of seabirds.

The Gibson's albatross Diomedea antipodensis gibsoni, Auckland shag Leucocarbo colensoi, Auckland teal Anas aucklandica, Auckland rail Lewinia muelleri and Auckland snipe Coenocorypha aucklandica are all endemic to the Auckland Island group. Of these only shags are currently breeding on main Auckland Island, in areas where introduced cats and pigs cannot access their nests.

The Auckland Island merganser Mergus australis went extinct in 1902. The population is thought to have been 20–30 breeding pairs prior to predation by introduced pigs and cats. The last specimen was collected as a museum specimen in January 1902.

List of resident bird species on Auckland Island
English name	Māori name	Scientific name	New Zealand Threat Status	Estimated no. breeding pairs on Auckland Islands group	Percentage of world population on Auckland Islands group	Status on main Auckland Island
Gibson's albatross		Diomedea antipodensis gibsoni	Nationally critical	> 5,800	100	Rare
Southern royal albatross	Toroa	Diomedea epomophora	Naturally uncommon	< 100	1	Rare, breeding
Northern royal albatross	Toroa	Diomedea sanfordi	Naturally uncommon	2	< 0.01	Absent
NZ white-capped albatross		Thalassarche cautasteadi	Declining	95,900	> 99	Local colonies
Light-mantled sooty albatross	Pēō / kōputu / toroa haunui / toroa ruru / toroa pango	Phobetria palpebrata	Declining	< 5,000	< 23	Occasional
Northern giant petrel	Pāngurunguru	Macronectes halli	Naturally uncommon	340	3	Rare
Yellow-eyed penguins	Hoiho / takaraha	Megadyptes antipodes	Nationally vulnerable	< 550	35–40	Breeding
Eastern rockhopper penguin		Eudyptes filholi	Nationally critical	< 3,000	1	Local colonies
Erect-crested penguin		Eudyptes sclateri	Declining	No recent records	Unknown	Absent
Snares Cape petrel		Daption capense australe	Naturally uncommon	> 10	1	Absent
White-chinned petrel		Procellaria aequinoctialis	Declining	> 153,000	13	Absent
White-headed petrel		Pterodroma lessonii	Not threatened	> 100,000	40	Absent
Sooty shearwater	Tītī (juve.) hakoko (ad.) / hākēkeke / koakoa / totorore / takakau / ōi	Puffinus griseus	Declining	> 10,000	< 1	Absent
Subantarctic diving petrel		Pelecanoides urinatrixexsul	Not threatened	> 1,000	< 1	Absent
Black-bellied storm petrel		Fregetta tropica	Not threatened	> 10,000	> 10	Absent
NZ white-faced storm petrel	Takahikare / takahikare-moana	Pelagodroma marina maoriana	Relict	> 10	< 1	Absent
Grey-backed storm petrel	Reoreo	Garrodia neresis	Relict	> 1,000	> 10	Absent
Lesser fulmar prion		Pachyptia crassirostris	Naturally uncommon	< 1,000	100	Absent
Antarctic prion	Totorore / whiroia	Pachyptila desolata	Naturally uncommon	100,000	< 1	Rare
Auckland Island shag	Kōau / kawau general name for shag or cormorant	Leucocarbo colensoi	Nationally vulnerable	1,500	100	Rare
New Zealand Antarctic tern		Sterna vittata bethunei	Recovering	> 50	> 10	Rare
Southern white-fronted tern		Sterna sterna	Declining	> 50	< 1	Rare
Red-billed gull	Tarāpunga / akiaki / katatē / taketake / makorā / karehākoa	Larus novaehollandiae scopulinus	Nationally vulnerable	< 300	< 1	Rare
Southern Black-backed Gull	Rāpunga / karoro / kōtingotingo (juve.) / pohio (juve.) / kaiē (juve.) / toie (chick)	Larus dominicanus dominicanus	Not threatened	< 500	< 1	Occasional
Subantarctic brown skua	Hākoakoa	Catharacta antarctica lonnbergi	Naturally uncommon	> 50	< 1	Occasional
Auckland Island teal	Tētē whero	Anas aucklandica	Nationally vulnerable	500	100	Absent
New Zealand falcon	Karearea	Falco novaeseelandiae	Nationally vulberable	> 15	> 1	Rare
Auckland Island banded dotterel	Pohowera / piopio /	Charadrius bicinctus	Naturally uncommon	> 300	100	Rare
Auckland Island rail		Lewinia muelleri	Naturally uncommon	Unknown	100	Absent
Auckland Island snipe	Hōkio / hākuai/ hākuwai / hōkio	Coenocorypha aucklandica aucklandica	Naturally uncommon	Unknown	100	Absent
Ruddy turnstone		Arenaria interpres	Migrant	Regular in small numbers	< 0.1	Rare
Auckland Island tomtit	Ngirungiru / piropiro / kōmiromiro	Petroica macrocephela marrineri	Naturally uncommon	Unknown	100	Breeding
Auckland Island pipit	Hīoi / pīhoihoi / whioi / kātaitai / whāioio / manu kahaki	Anthus novaeseelandiae aucklandicus	Recovering	> 1,000	100	Breeding
Red-crowned parakeet	Kakariki / porete / kākāwaiariki / kākāwariki / kawariki / pōreterete / pōwhaitere / torete / tōreterete	Cyanoramphus novaezelandiae	Relict	Unknown	Unknown	Occasional
Yellow-crowned parakeet	Kakariki / porete / kākāwaiariki / kākāwariki / kawariki / pōreterete / pōwhaitere / torete / tōreterete	Cyanoramphus auriceps	Not threatened	Unknown	Unknown	Rare
Tui	Tūī	Prosthemadera novaeseelandiae	Not threatened	Unknown	Unknown	Occasional
Bellbird	Korimako	Anthornis melanura	Not threatened	Unknown	Unknown	Common
Silvereye	Pihipihi / tauhou / hiraka / iringatau / kanohi mōwhiti / mōtengitengi / pīkaraihe / poporohe / whiorangi	Zosterops lateralis	Not threatened	Unknown	Unknown	Common

== Introduced species ==
There are currently introduced pigs, cats and mice on Auckland Island. Auckland Island is the only island within the New Zealand Subantarctic Island Area with invasive mammalian pests. A project proposed by the Department of Conservation aims to remove these pests from the island, with feasibility trials started in 2018.

DNA analysis suggests that mice—Mus musculus—did not colonise Auckland Island from a New Zealand population but instead arrived with whalers or sealers from North America. They eat invertebrates, seeds, other plant material, native fish eggs and can eat bird eggs and chicks. They severely deplete invertebrate populations, reduce the seedbank, eat seedlings & plants and compete with birds for food resources.

Domestic cats—Felis catus—were first recorded at Terror Cove in 1840, presumably introduced by sealers, but most likely arrived in the two decades prior to this. The impact of cats on the birds of Auckland Island was first noted by the Coastwatchers, who tamed some for company – the Ranui Station cats were recorded to kill 60 Antarctic prions over three months in 1942. Ornithologist Brian Bell found that prions were confined to cliff faces at Crozier Point in 1962 and noted "any bird landing...[fell] an immediate prey to the feral cats.". Gut content and scat analysis show that cats are feeding on small passerines and seabirds. A cat was seen feeding on a pre-fledging juvenile white-capped mollymawk at South West Cape.

Goats were introduced to the Auckland Islands several times in the second half of the nineteenth century, to serve as a source of food for castaway sailors, with at least one liberation in 1865 on the main Auckland Island. By the 1970s, only one population remained, a group of about 100 based on the northwest side of Port Ross, in the north-east of the main island. Browsing by goats caused significant damage to lowland tussock Chinochloa antarctica in particular. In 1986 and 1987, over 60 animals were removed from the island for captive breeding in New Zealand. A decision was made to eradicate the remaining animals, an operation which was completed by 1992. An investigation in 1999 into the fate of the translocated animals in New Zealand found that the breed had become extinct.

Pigs—Sus scrofa—were first introduced at Port Ross in the north of Auckland Island in 1807 by Captain Abraham Bristow and several further liberations occurred in the 19th century. The pigs were intended as a food source for shipwreck survivors and sealers. Auckland Island pigs are a feral race of domestic pigs which are considered a distinct breed by the Rare Breeds Conservation Society of New Zealand. Pigs have had a severe impact on populations of megaherbs, with populations of these plants on Auckland Island being almost totally depleted by the early 1900s.

Dunnocks, common redpolls, Eurasian blackbirds, song thrushes and common starlings which were introduced onto mainland New Zealand have naturally established on Auckland Island.

Olearia lyalli is a tree asterad native to New Zealand which may have arrived with humans in the 19th century. It is spreading from a historic settlement site at Erebus Cove and covers neighbouring Ewing Island. Harakeke, Phormium tenax, is found at Erebus Cove, Sealer's Creek, Ranui Cove and Tandy Inlet, and was introduced probably by the second wave of sealers to visit the island, to make rope, twine, baskets, mats etc. Koromiko, Veronica salicifolia, was first reported in 1975 around the Lindley Point farmhouse site at Deas Head, built in 1851.

In February 2025, the Department of Conservation (DOC) announced a pest eradication project on the island. The project, part of the Island-Ocean Connection Challenge (IOCC), targets three islands up to 15 times larger than any previously cleared of pests in New Zealand. The goal is to remove invasive species, restore ecosystems, and protect native wildlife, including kākāpō, seabirds, and rare plants. The total project cost is estimated at $202 million, with $54 million from the government and $11.5 million raised through philanthropy, leaving $137 million still needed.

== Human presence on the island ==
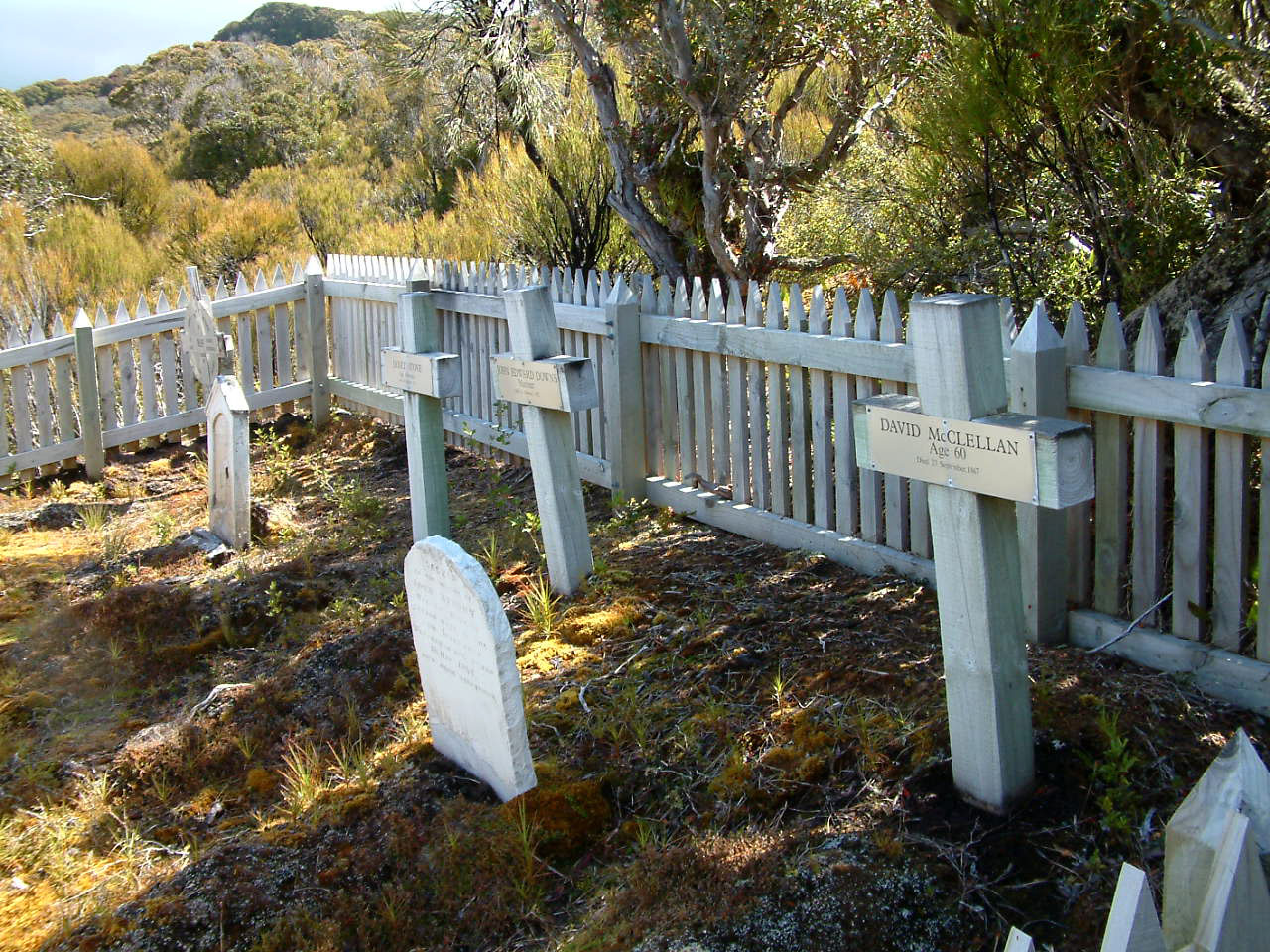
Hardwicke graveyard, 2011

There is archaeological evidence that the Auckland Islands were briefly settled and abandoned by Polynesians around 600–700 years ago. Māori and Moriori from the Chatham Islands settled at Ranui Cove from 1842 till 1856. Auckland Island was the site of the failed settlement of Hardwicke, which was founded in 1849 but survived only three years before being disbanded in 1852.

Both the Grafton and the Invercauld were wrecked on Auckland Island in 1864, and groups of survivors lived unaware of each other on opposite ends of the island. The Grafton survivors lived for 18 months on the island before building a boat and sailing to New Zealand; the Invercauld survivors camped in the remains of Hardwicke; and all but three died before being rescued.

The German transit of Venus expedition of 1874 made observations from Terror Cove in Port Ross.

Coastwatchers from the Cape Expedition were stationed on the island from March 1941 to October 1945. Two stations were constructed: One at Ranui Cove in outer Port Ross and another at Tagua, on Musgrave Peninsula in Carnley Harbour. A base at Waterfall Inlet was the mooring point for the Ranui which serviced the stations.

== See also ==
- List of Antarctic and subantarctic islands
- List of islands of New Zealand
- List of islands
- New Zealand subantarctic islands
- Desert island
