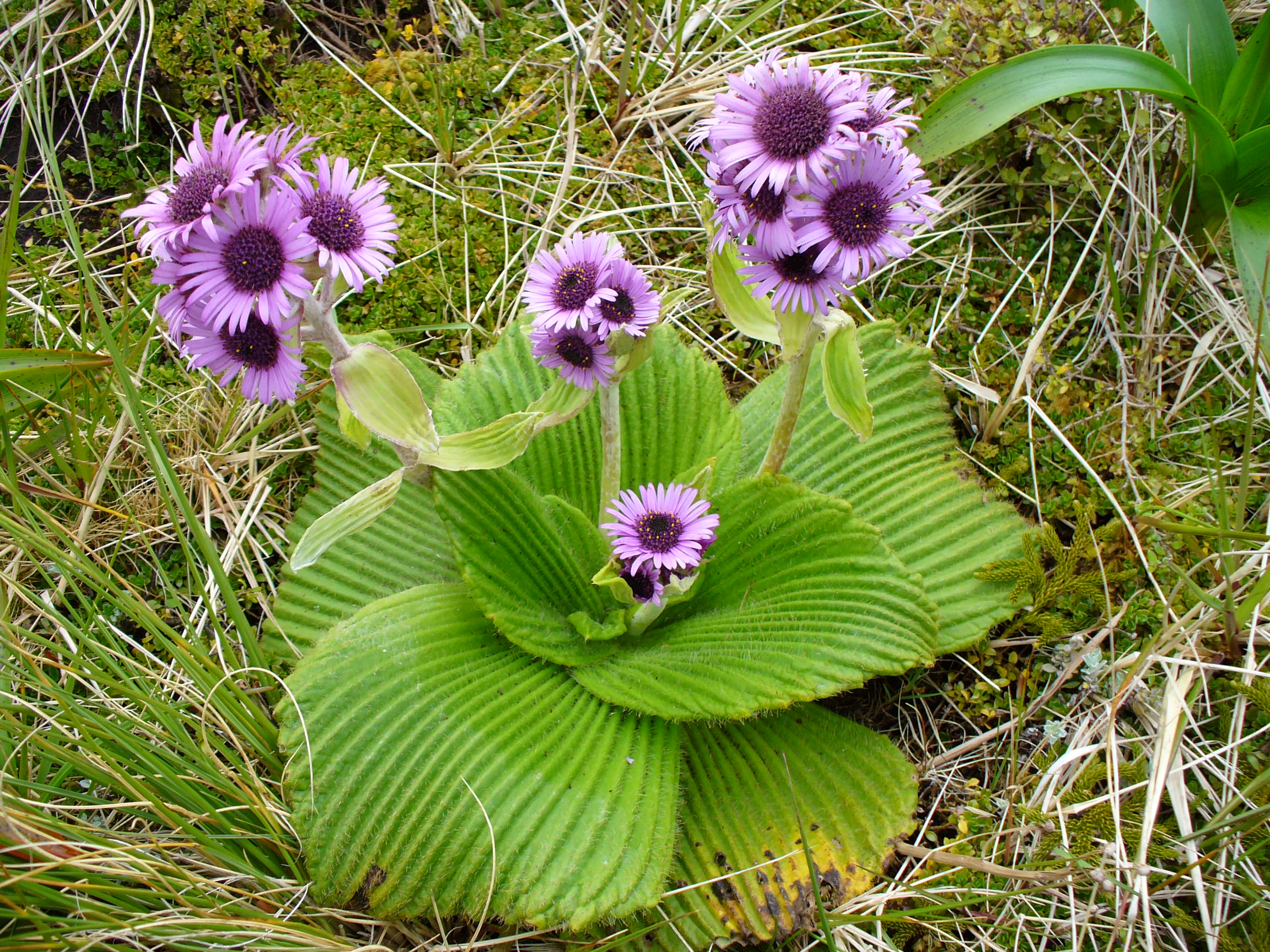
- Pleurophyllum speciosum

Scientific classification
- Kingdom: Plantae
- Clade: Tracheophytes
- Clade: Angiosperms
- Clade: Eudicots
- Clade: Asterids
- Order: Asterales
- Family: Asteraceae
- Subfamily: Asteroideae
- Tribe: Astereae
- Subtribe: Celmisiinae
- Genus: Pleurophyllum; Hook.f.

Synonyms
- Albinea Hombr. & Jacquinot ex Decne.; Pachythrix Hook.f. 1844, name published as synonym

= Pleurophyllum =

Genus of plants

Pleurophyllum is a genus of subantarctic plants in the tribe Astereae within the family Asteraceae.

Pleurophyllum is native to the subantarctic islands of New Zealand (the Auckland Islands, Campbell Island and the Antipodes Islands) and Australia (Macquarie Island).

Species

- Pleurophyllum criniferum Hook.f., = P. oresigenesum, Albinia oresigenesum
- Pleurophyllum hookeri Buch.
- Pleurophyllum speciosum Hook.f.

== Gallery ==
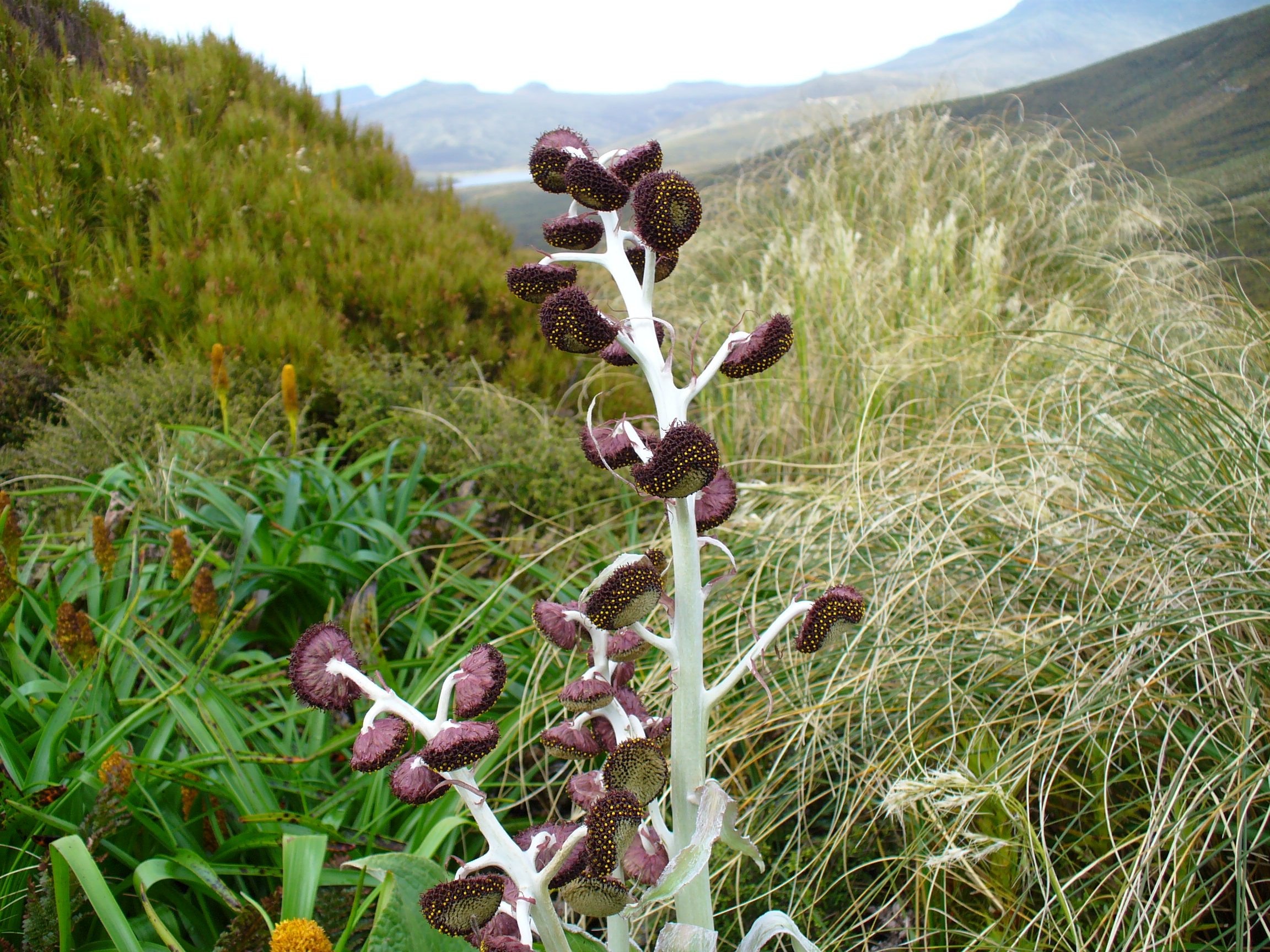
Pleurophyllum criniferum flowers on Campbell Island, with yellow-orange flowers of Bulbinella rossii behind.
