= Auckland Islands =

Volcanic archipelago in New Zealand

Native name: Motu Maha (Māori); or; Maungahuka (Māori)
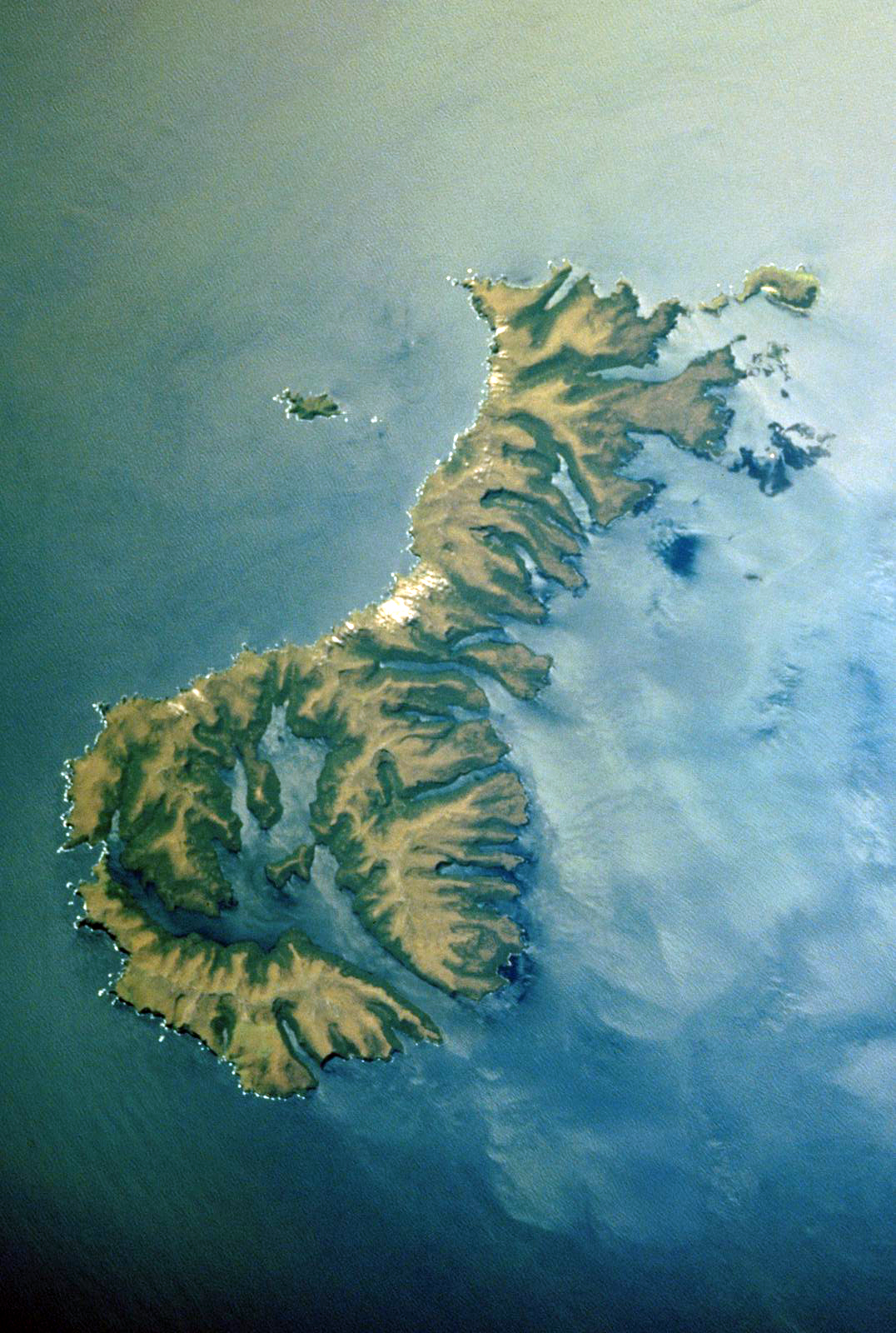
- The Auckland Islands as seen by STS-89 in 1998, with the northwest towards the top of the image

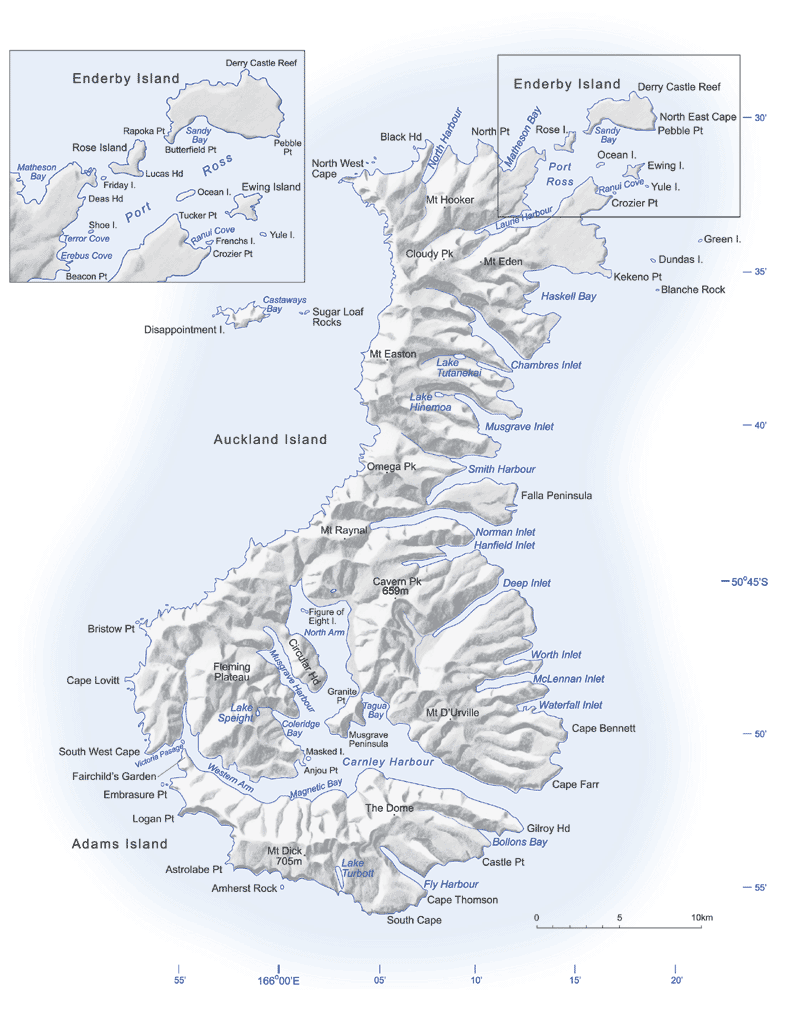
- Map of the Auckland Islands

Geography
- Location: South Pacific Ocean
- Coordinates: 50.7°S 166.1°E
- Archipelago: Auckland Islands
- Total islands: 31+
- Major islands: Auckland Island, Adams Island, Enderby Island, Disappointment Island, Ewing Island, Dundas Island, Green Island
- Area: 570 km^{2} (220 sq mi)
- Highest elevation: 705 m (2313 ft)
- Highest point: Mount Dick

Administration
- New Zealand
- Area Outside Territorial Authority: New Zealand Subantarctic Islands

Demographics
- Population: 0 (2015)

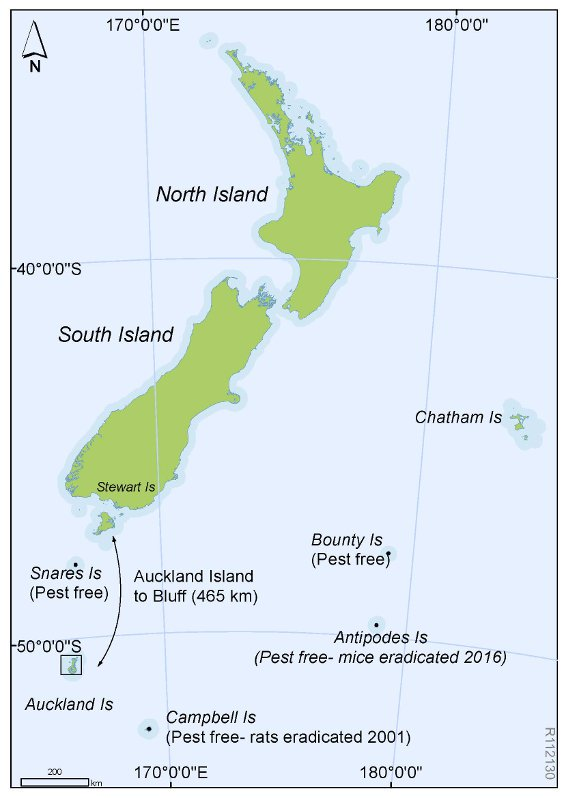
Location map for Auckland Islands, showing position from New Zealand.

The Auckland Islands (Māori: Motu Maha "Many islands" or Maungahuka "Snowy mountains") is an archipelago of New Zealand, lying 465 km (289 mi) south of the South Island. The main Auckland Island, occupying 460 km^{2} (180 sq mi), is surrounded by smaller Adams Island, Enderby Island, Disappointment Island, Ewing Island, Rose Island, Dundas Island, and Green Island, with a combined area of 570 km^{2} (220 sq mi). The islands currently have no permanent human inhabitants, despite several previous attempts at settlement. Archaeological remains found on Enderby Island show that the islands represent the most southerly known Polynesian outpost to date.

The islands are listed with the New Zealand Outlying Islands. The islands are an immediate part of New Zealand, but not part of any region or district, but instead Area Outside Territorial Authority, like all the other outlying islands except the Solander Islands.

Ecologically, the Auckland Islands form part of the Antipodes Subantarctic Islands tundra ecoregion. Along with other New Zealand Subantarctic Islands, they were designated a UNESCO World Heritage Site in 1998.

== Geography ==
The Auckland Islands lie 360 km (220 mi) south of Stewart Island, and 465 km (289 mi) from the South Island port of Bluff, between the latitudes 50° 30' and 50° 55' S and longitudes 165° 50' and 166° 20' E.

They include Auckland Island, Adams Island, Enderby Island, Disappointment Island, Ewing Island, Rose Island, Dundas Island, and Green Island, with a combined area of 570 km^{2} (220 sq mi). The islands are close to each other, forming a kind of banjo-shape, incised by narrow channels, and a rugged coastline, with numerous deep inlets.

Auckland Island, the main island, has an approximate land area of 510 km^{2} (197 sq mi), and a length of 42 km (26 mi). It is notable for its steep cliffs and rugged terrain, which rises to over 600 m (1,969 ft). Prominent peaks include Cavern Peak (659 m or 2,162 ft), Mount Raynal (635 m or 2,083 ft), Mount D'Urville (630 m or 2,067 ft), Mount Easton (610 m or 2,001 ft), and the Tower of Babel (550 m or 1,804 ft). The southern end of the island broadens to a width of 26 km (16 mi).

Here, the narrow channel of Carnley Harbour (the Adams Straits on some maps) separates the main island from the roughly triangular Adams Island (97 km^{2} (37 sq mi)), which is even more mountainous, reaching a height of 705 m (2,313 ft) at Mount Dick. The channel is the remains of the crater of an extinct volcano, and Adams Island and the southern part of the main island form the crater rim. The main island features many sharply incised inlets, notably Port Ross at the northern end.

The group includes numerous other smaller islands, notably Disappointment Island (northwest of the main island) and Enderby Island (off the northern tip of the main island), altogether covering 12 km^{2} (4.6 sq mi).

Most of the islands have a volcanic origin, with the archipelago dominated by two 12-million-year-old Miocene shield volcanoes, subsequently eroded and dissected. These rest on older volcanic rocks 15–25 million years old with some older granites and fossil-bearing sedimentary rocks from around 100 million years ago.

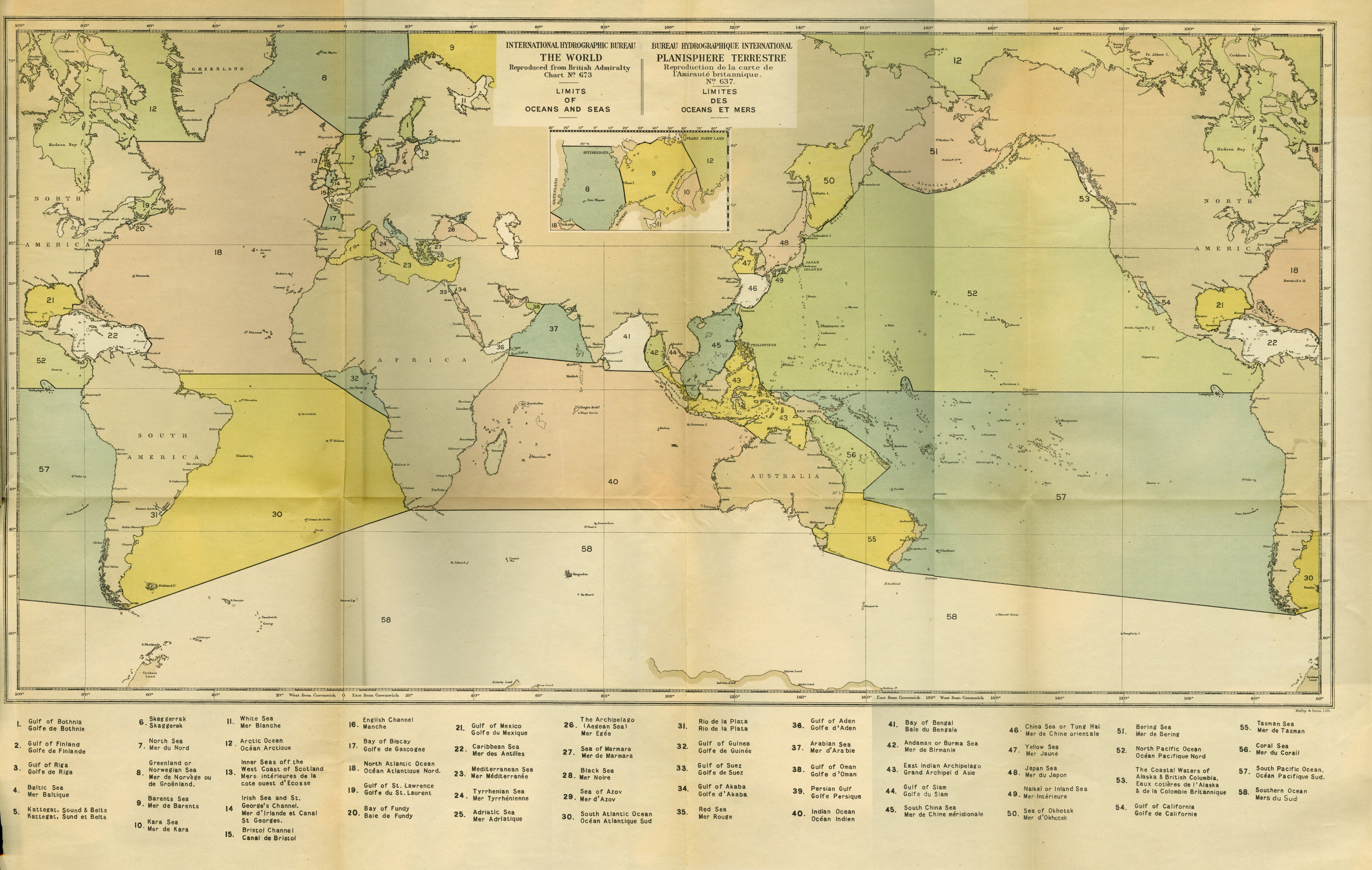
1928 delineation of Southern Ocean including Auckland Islands

Currently, the Auckland Islands are considered to be located in the South Pacific. Historically, however, the islands were considered to be in the Southern Ocean, whose boundaries have been redefined on numerous occarions in recent years.

=== Islands ===
The following table includes named islands according to Land Information New Zealand.

Location	Area (ha)
Auckland Island	45,916.6
Adams Island	9,695.8
Enderby Island	695.9
Disappointment Island	289.5
Rose Island	80.2
Ewing Island	58.3
Ocean Island	11.9
Detached Rock	7.5
Adams Rocks	7.5
Masked Island	5.7
Figure of Eight Island	5.3
Column Rocks	5.2
Dundas Island	4.9
Sugar Loaf Rocks	4.8
Monumental Island	4.3
Lantern Rocks	3.9
Green Island	3.0
Compadre Rock	2.8
Frenchs Island	1.9
Five Sisters Rocks	1.9
Yule Island	1.6
Friday Island	1.6
Pinnacle Rocks	1.5
Pillar Rock	1.2
Blanche Rock	1.0
Amherst Rock	0.8
Shag Rock	0.5
Beehive Rock	0.4
Beacon Rock	0.3
Davis Island	0.1
Archer Rock	0.1
Total	56,816.1

=== Climate ===
Port Ross features a subpolar oceanic climate (Cfc according to the Köppen climate classification system). Like many other Subpolar oceanic climates, Port Ross, along with the Auckland Islands in general, are characterised by the near-constant overcast weather and never being too hot or too cold.

This borders on an extremely mild-wintered, maritime-influenced tundra climate.

Climate data for Enderby Island (1991–2020 normals, extremes 1991–present)
Month	Jan	Feb	Mar	Apr	May	Jun	Jul	Aug	Sep	Oct	Nov	Dec	Year
Record high °C (°F)	16.9 (62.4)	17.2 (63.0)	16.1 (61.0)	13.8 (56.8)	13.6 (56.5)	12.4 (54.3)	13.2 (55.8)	11.8 (53.2)	12.6 (54.7)	12.7 (54.9)	14.0 (57.2)	16.9 (62.4)	17.2 (63.0)
Mean maximum °C (°F)	14.4 (57.9)	14.4 (57.9)	13.7 (56.7)	12.6 (54.7)	11.6 (52.9)	10.3 (50.5)	10.2 (50.4)	10.2 (50.4)	10.7 (51.3)	11.6 (52.9)	12.6 (54.7)	13.7 (56.7)	14.9 (58.8)
Mean daily maximum °C (°F)	12.4 (54.3)	12.4 (54.3)	11.6 (52.9)	10.5 (50.9)	9.2 (48.6)	8.1 (46.6)	7.8 (46.0)	8.2 (46.8)	8.8 (47.8)	9.6 (49.3)	10.4 (50.7)	11.7 (53.1)	10.1 (50.1)
Daily mean °C (°F)	10.3 (50.5)	10.3 (50.5)	9.7 (49.5)	8.7 (47.7)	7.5 (45.5)	6.3 (43.3)	6.1 (43.0)	6.4 (43.5)	6.8 (44.2)	7.4 (45.3)	8.2 (46.8)	9.5 (49.1)	8.1 (46.6)
Mean daily minimum °C (°F)	8.2 (46.8)	8.2 (46.8)	7.7 (45.9)	6.8 (44.2)	5.7 (42.3)	4.4 (39.9)	4.3 (39.7)	4.5 (40.1)	4.8 (40.6)	5.1 (41.2)	5.9 (42.6)	7.3 (45.1)	6.1 (42.9)
Mean minimum °C (°F)	4.9 (40.8)	4.6 (40.3)	4.1 (39.4)	2.7 (36.9)	0.6 (33.1)	−0.5 (31.1)	−0.1 (31.8)	0.1 (32.2)	0.1 (32.2)	1.1 (34.0)	1.7 (35.1)	3.7 (38.7)	−1.8 (28.8)
Record low °C (°F)	1.2 (34.2)	2.7 (36.9)	2.0 (35.6)	−0.2 (31.6)	−2.9 (26.8)	−3.2 (26.2)	−4.2 (24.4)	−3.6 (25.5)	−1.9 (28.6)	−2.1 (28.2)	−0.5 (31.1)	1.7 (35.1)	−4.2 (24.4)
Average rainfall mm (inches)	104.7 (4.12)	89.1 (3.51)	110.2 (4.34)	90.3 (3.56)	99.4 (3.91)	84.1 (3.31)	75.8 (2.98)	68.2 (2.69)	86.9 (3.42)	89.8 (3.54)	89.9 (3.54)	87.1 (3.43)	1,075.5 (42.35)
Source: Earth Sciences NZ

Climate data for Port Ross (1941–1945)
Month	Jan	Feb	Mar	Apr	May	Jun	Jul	Aug	Sep	Oct	Nov	Dec	Year
Record high °C (°F)	18.3 (65.0)	19.3 (66.8)	18.5 (65.3)	14.3 (57.7)	12.3 (54.2)	10.8 (51.4)	12.4 (54.4)	12.1 (53.7)	14.1 (57.4)	15.8 (60.5)	15.6 (60.0)	17.3 (63.2)	19.3 (66.8)
Mean daily maximum °C (°F)	14.8 (58.6)	14.4 (58.0)	12.9 (55.2)	10.7 (51.3)	9.1 (48.4)	7.8 (46.1)	8.8 (47.8)	8.8 (47.8)	9.9 (49.9)	11.3 (52.3)	12.1 (53.7)	13.4 (56.1)	11.2 (52.1)
Daily mean °C (°F)	11.2 (52.1)	11.0 (51.8)	9.8 (49.7)	8.8 (47.8)	6.5 (43.7)	5.4 (41.7)	6.1 (42.9)	5.8 (42.5)	6.9 (44.4)	7.8 (46.1)	8.4 (47.2)	9.8 (49.7)	8.1 (46.6)
Mean daily minimum °C (°F)	7.6 (45.7)	7.5 (45.5)	6.8 (44.2)	6.4 (43.5)	4.1 (39.3)	3.2 (37.8)	3.3 (37.9)	2.9 (37.2)	3.8 (38.9)	4.4 (39.9)	5.0 (41.0)	6.3 (43.3)	5.1 (41.2)
Record low °C (°F)	2.1 (35.8)	2.4 (36.3)	1.4 (34.5)	0.8 (33.4)	−1.6 (29.1)	−1.8 (28.7)	−2.6 (27.4)	−1.7 (28.9)	−1.8 (28.7)	−1.6 (29.1)	−0.3 (31.5)	0.2 (32.4)	−2.6 (27.4)
Average precipitation mm (inches)	110 (4.2)	120 (4.8)	140 (5.5)	180 (7.0)	150 (5.9)	150 (5.8)	84 (3.3)	110 (4.3)	120 (4.9)	100 (4.1)	110 (4.4)	120 (4.9)	1,494 (59.1)
Average precipitation days	22	22	27	27	26	26	28	28	27	27	25	26	311
Source: https://newzealandecology.org/system/files/articles/ProNZES12_37.pdf

Climate data for Port Ross (1941–1945)
Month	Jan	Feb	Mar	Apr	May	Jun	Jul	Aug	Sep	Oct	Nov	Dec	Year
Average sea temperature °C (°F)	10.4 (50.8)	10.5 (51.0)	10.2 (50.5)	9.6 (49.3)	8.5 (47.4)	7.8 (46.1)	7.6 (45.7)	7.2 (45.1)	7.7 (46.0)	8.2 (46.8)	8.8 (47.9)	9.5 (49.2)	8.8 (47.9)

Climate data for Carnley Harbour (1941–1945)
Month	Jan	Feb	Mar	Apr	May	Jun	Jul	Aug	Sep	Oct	Nov	Dec	Year
Record high °C (°F)	16.7 (62.0)	18.8 (65.8)	18.1 (64.5)	14.6 (58.3)	11.2 (52.1)	12.0 (53.6)	13.1 (55.6)	12.2 (54.0)	14.0 (57.2)	14.6 (58.2)	14.7 (58.4)	15.7 (60.2)	18.8 (65.8)
Mean daily maximum °C (°F)	12.9 (55.3)	13.4 (56.2)	12.9 (55.2)	10.7 (51.2)	8.4 (47.1)	7.9 (46.3)	8.6 (47.5)	8.4 (47.1)	9.2 (48.5)	10.2 (50.4)	10.6 (51.0)	11.6 (52.8)	10.4 (50.7)
Daily mean °C (°F)	10.1 (50.2)	10.4 (50.7)	10.1 (50.2)	8.1 (46.6)	5.9 (42.6)	5.7 (42.2)	6.1 (42.9)	5.6 (42.0)	6.4 (43.6)	6.8 (44.3)	7.1 (44.7)	8.2 (46.7)	7.5 (45.6)
Mean daily minimum °C (°F)	7.2 (45.0)	7.3 (45.2)	7.3 (45.2)	5.6 (42.0)	3.3 (38.0)	3.4 (38.1)	3.4 (38.2)	2.8 (37.0)	3.8 (38.9)	4.1 (39.3)	4.2 (39.5)	5.1 (41.1)	4.8 (40.6)
Record low °C (°F)	3.3 (37.9)	3.3 (37.9)	2.9 (37.3)	1.2 (34.1)	−1.7 (29.0)	−0.1 (31.9)	−1.4 (29.5)	−1.6 (29.1)	−0.8 (30.5)	0.3 (32.5)	−0.4 (31.2)	−0.2 (31.6)	−1.7 (29.0)
Average precipitation mm (inches)	180 (7.2)	140 (5.7)	140 (5.7)	250 (9.8)	240 (9.3)	190 (7.4)	130 (5.3)	190 (7.3)	150 (5.9)	130 (5.1)	140 (5.4)	220 (8.6)	2,100 (82.7)
Average precipitation days	25	24	26	28	29	29	29	30	29	29	25	28	331
Source: https://newzealandecology.org/system/files/articles/ProNZES12_37.pdf

Carnley Harbour also features a subpolar oceanic climate (Cfc according to the Köppen climate classification system), though it exaggerates the features shown in Port Ross, as it is much wetter and a lot more affected by ocean-moderation.

The Auckland Islands have a fairly constant cool and wet weather year-round, with neither winter being excessively cold nor summer excessively hot. The climate is most similar to that seen in the Faroe Islands and Aleutian Islands.

== History ==
Map showing the Auckland Islands in relation to other areas of Austronesian and Polynesian expansion.

=== Discovery and early exploitation ===
Archaeologists have proven that Polynesian voyagers first discovered the Auckland Islands. Traces of Polynesian settlement, possibly dating to the 13th century, have been found by archaeologists on Enderby Island. This constitutes the most southerly settlement by Polynesians yet known. There are possible traces of Polynesian shell middens elsewhere in the islands.

The whaler Ocean, captained by Abraham Bristow, rediscovered the islands in 1806, finding them uninhabited. Bristow named them "Lord Auckland's" on 18 August 1806 in honour of his father's friend William Eden, 1st Baron Auckland (whose son the Earl of Auckland would be namesake of New Zealand's largest city). Bristow worked for the businessman Samuel Enderby, the namesake of Enderby Island. The following year Bristow returned on Sarah to claim the archipelago for Britain. The explorers Dumont D'Urville and James Clark Ross visited in 1839 and in 1840 respectively.

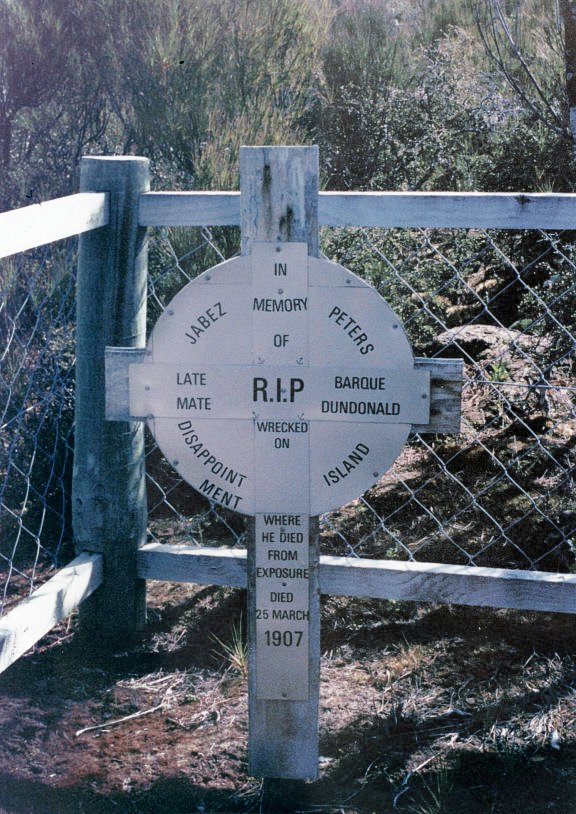
Restored grave of Jabez Peters, first officer of the Dundonald, in the graveyard on the main island.

Whalers and sealers set up temporary bases, the islands becoming one of the principal sealing stations in the Pacific in the years immediately after their discovery. By 1812, so many seals had been killed that the islands lost their commercial importance and sealers redirected their efforts towards Campbell and Macquarie Islands. Visits to the islands declined, although recovering seal populations allowed a modest revival in sealing in the mid-1820s.

The sealing era lasted from 1807 till 1894, during which time 82 vessels are recorded as visiting for sealing purposes. Some 11 of these ships were wrecked off-shore. Relics of the sealing period include inscriptions, the remains of huts, and graves.

=== Settlement ===
Now uninhabited, the islands saw unsuccessful settlements in the mid-19th century. In 1842, a small party of 70 Māori and their Moriori slaves from the Chatham Islands migrated to the archipelago, surviving for about 20 years or so on sealing and flax growing. Samuel Enderby's grandson, Charles Enderby, proposed a community based on agriculture and whaling in 1846. This settlement, established at Port Ross in 1849 and named Hardwicke, lasted only two and a half years. Māori and Moriori settlement continued until 1866, when most of the Māori and some of the Moriori returned to the Chatham Islands; however, most of the Moriori settled on Stewart Island, where some of their descendants continue to live today.

The Auckland Islands were part of the Colony of New Zealand under the Letters Patent of April 1842, which fixed the southern boundary of New Zealand at 53° south, but they were then excluded by the New Zealand Constitution Act 1846, which defined the southern boundary at 47° 10' south; however, they were again included by the New Zealand Boundaries Act of 1863, an act of the Imperial Parliament at Westminster that extended the boundaries of the colony once more.

=== Shipwrecks ===
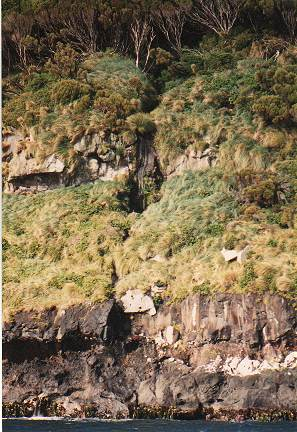
Auckland's southern coast

The Grafton, captained by Thomas Musgrave, was wrecked in Carnley Harbour in 1864. Madelene Ferguson Allen's narrative about her great-grandfather, Robert Holding, and the wreck of the Scottish sailing ship Invercauld, wrecked in the Auckland Islands a few months later in 1864, counterpoints the Grafton story. François Édouard Raynal wrote Wrecked on a Reef.

In 1866, one of New Zealand's most famous shipwrecks, that of the General Grant, occurred on the western coast. Ten survivors waited for rescue on Auckland Island for 18 months. Several attempts have failed to salvage its cargo, allegedly including bullion.

Because of the probability of wrecks around the islands, calls arose for the establishment of emergency depots for castaways in 1868. The New Zealand authorities established and maintained three such depots, at Port Ross, Norman Inlet and Carnley Harbour from 1887. They also cached additional supplies, including boats (to help reach the depots) and 40 finger-posts (which had smaller amounts of supplies), around the islands.

A further maritime tragedy occurred in 1907, with the loss of the Dundonald and 12 of her crew, off Disappointment Island. The 15 survivors lived off the supplies in the Auckland Island depot.

In 2019, a helicopter with three people on board crashed into the ocean near Enderby Island, when they were en route to uplift an ill man on a fishing trawler. All three survived the crash, and were found the next day with only minor injuries. The rescue effort was led by Richard Hayes.

=== Scientific research and reserve ===
Three independent scientific expeditions visited the Auckland Islands in 1840. These included the United States Wilkes Expedition aboard the USS Porpoise, d'Urville's second voyage of the Astrolabe (French), and the British Ross Expedition aboard the Erebus and Terror.

The Sub-Antarctic Islands Scientific Expedition of 1907 by the Philosophical Institute of Canterbury, New Zealand, aboard the ship Hinemoa, spent two weeks on the islands conducting a magnetic survey and taking botanical, zoological and geological specimens.

From 1941 to 1945, the islands hosted a New Zealand meteorological station as part of a World War II coastwatching programme staffed by scientist volunteers and known for security reasons as the "Cape Expedition". Along with their other duties the Cape Expedition staff undertook biodiversity research and collected scientific specimens. The staff of the Cape Expedition included Robert Falla, later an eminent New Zealand scientist. The 1972–1973 Auckland Islands Expedition spent several months studying the fauna and flora of the Auckland Islands.

Currently the islands have no inhabitants, although scientists visit regularly and the authorities allow limited tourism on Enderby Island and Auckland Island.

The marine environment surrounding the archipelago became a marine mammal sanctuary in 1993 and, unusually, also a marine reserve in 2003, measuring 4,980 km^{2} (1,920 sq mi). The Subantarctic Islands marine reserves around the Auckland, Antipodes, Bounty and Campbell Islands combined form the largest natural sanctuary in New Zealand.

== Ecology ==
=== Plants ===
The botany of the islands was first described in the Flora of Lord Auckland and Campbell's Islands, a product of the Ross expedition of 1839–43, written by Joseph Dalton Hooker and published by Reeve Brothers in London between 1843 and 1845. Since then, many other botanists have studied the flora of the Auckland Islands, which comprises 228 vascular plant species, of which over 80% are indigenous and about 20% are introduced.

The vegetation of the islands sub-divides into distinct altitudinal zones. Inland from the salt-spray zone, the fringes of the islands predominantly feature forests of southern rātā Metrosideros umbellata, and in places the subantarctic tree daisy (Olearia lyallii), probably introduced by sealers. Above this exists a subalpine shrub zone dominated by Dracophyllum, Coprosma and Myrsine (with some rātā). At higher elevations tussock grass and megaherb communities dominate the flora.

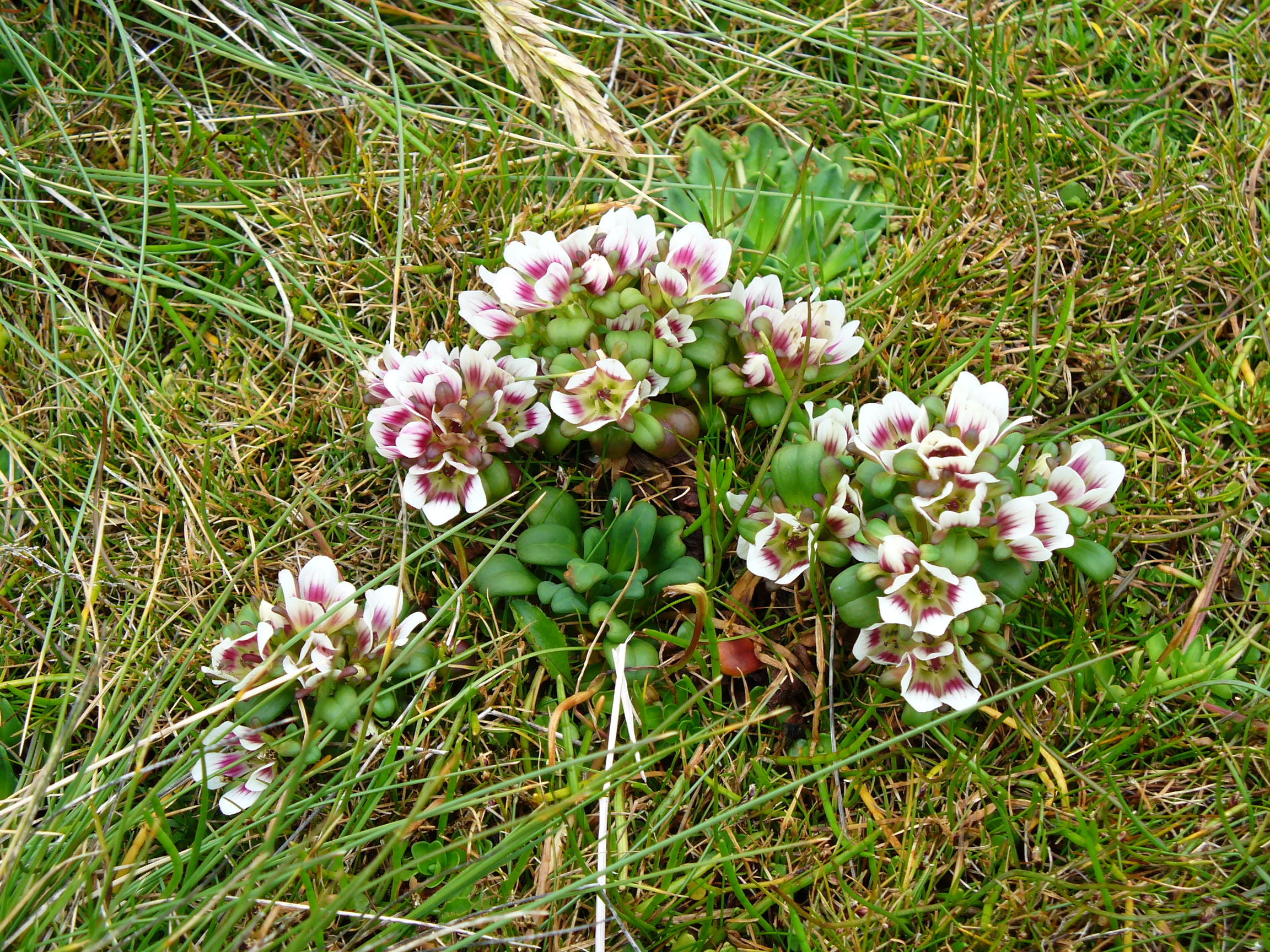
Gentianella concinna, an endemic plant of the Auckland Islands.

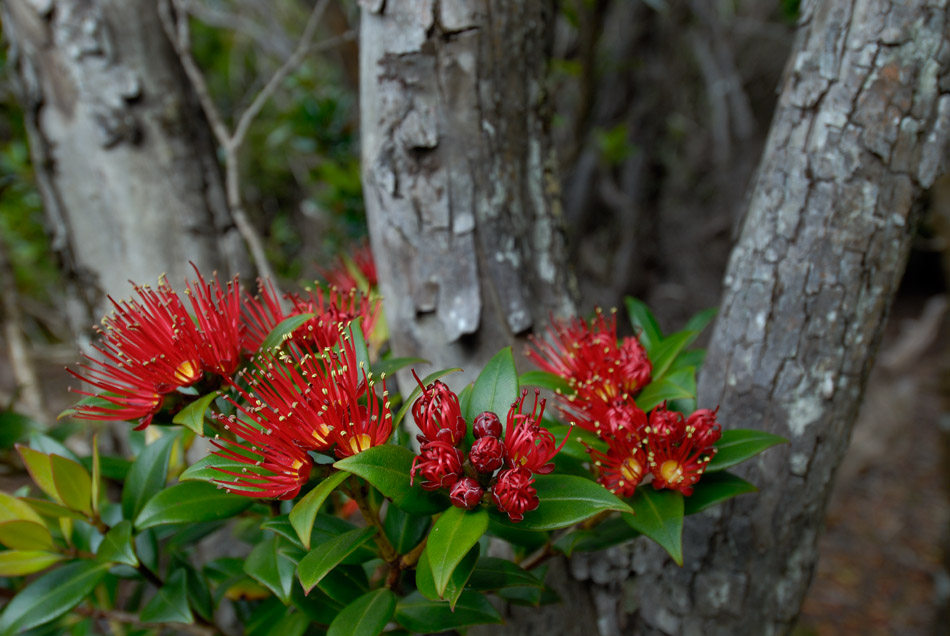
Metrosideros umbellata

=== Invertebrates ===
The islands host the largest communities of subantarctic invertebrates, with 24 species of spider, 11 species of springtail and over 200 insects. These include 57 species of beetle, 110 flies and 39 moths. The islands also boast an endemic genus and species of wētā, Dendroplectron aucklandensis.

=== Fresh and saltwater fauna ===
The freshwater environments of the islands host a freshwater fish, the kōaro or climbing galaxias, which lives in saltwater as a juvenile but which returns to the rivers as an adult. The islands have 19 species of endemic freshwater invertebrates, including one mollusc, one crustacean, a mayfly, 12 flies and two caddisflies. The Auckland Islands cockle is endemic to the islands.

=== Marine mammals ===
There are two species of seal which haul out on the islands, the New Zealand fur seal and the threatened New Zealand sea lion. Southern elephant seals are frequent migrants in winter, and leopard seals may also appear.

A recovering population of more than 2,000 southern right whales is found off the islands, and the Port Ross area is considered significant and a well-established congregating ground for whales in New Zealand waters. Its importance exceeds the Campbell Island ground.

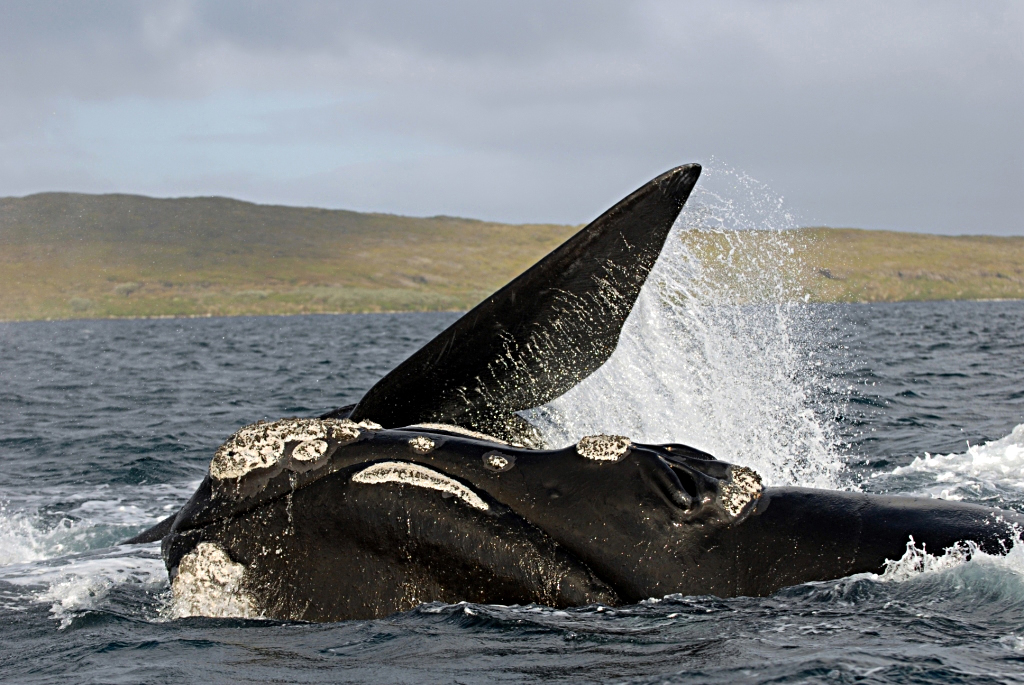
Southern right whales cavorting in Port Ross

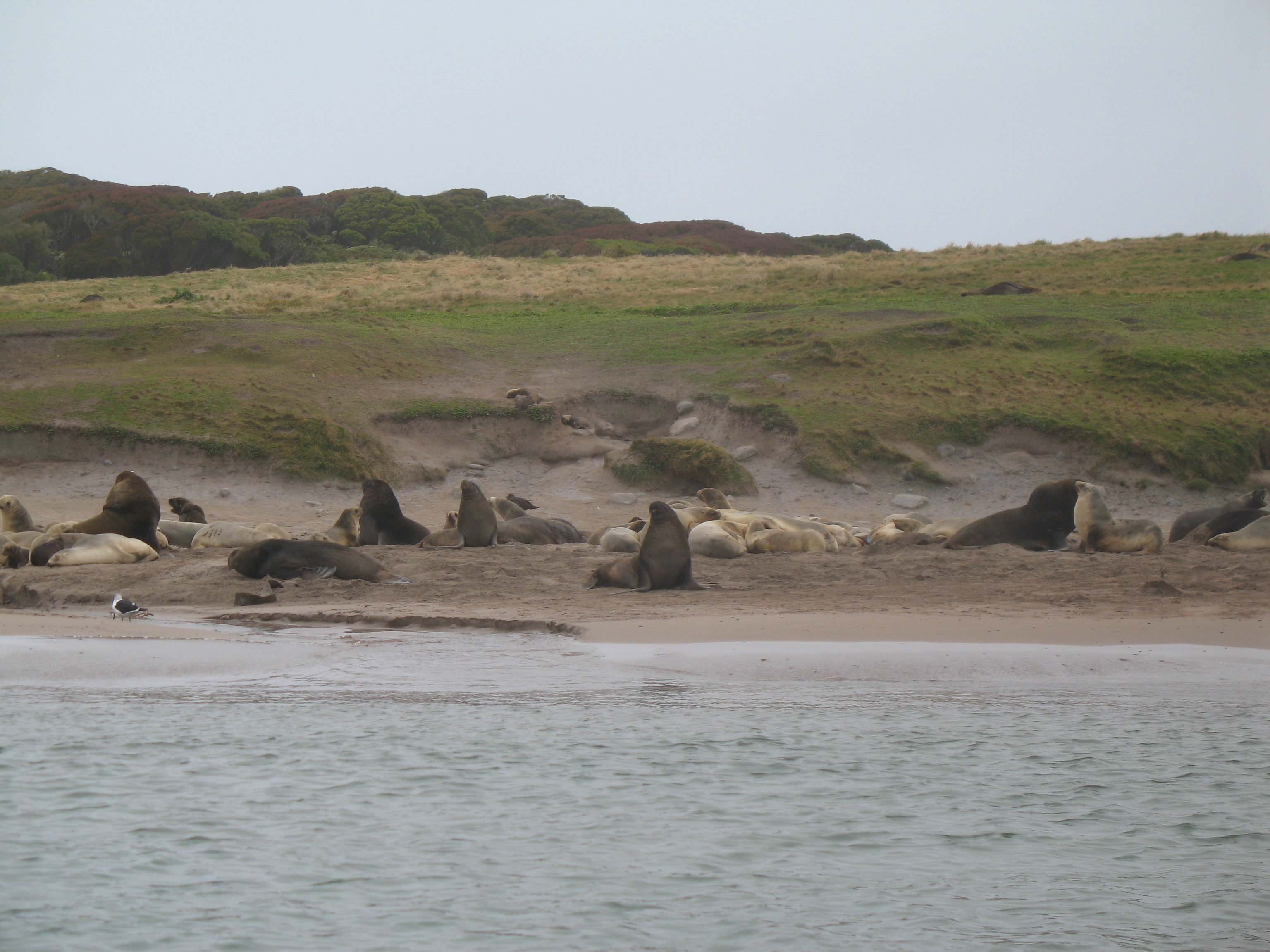
By the 21st century the islands had become the primary breeding location of New Zealand sea lions.

=== Birds ===
The islands hold important seabird breeding colonies, among them albatrosses, penguins and several small petrels, with a million pairs of sooty shearwater. Landbirds include red-fronted and yellow-crowned parakeet, New Zealand falcon, tūī, bellbirds, pipits, and an endemic subspecies of tomtit.

The whole Auckland Island group has been identified as an Important Bird Area (IBA) by BirdLife International because of its significance as a breeding site for several species of seabirds as well as eight endemic species or subspecies, including Auckland shag, Auckland teal, Auckland rail, Auckland snipe, Gibson's albatross, Auckland Island banded dotterel, Auckland Island tomtit, and the now extinct Auckland Island merganser. The seabirds include eastern rockhopper and yellow-eyed penguins; Antipodean, southern royal, light-mantled and white-capped albatrosses; and white-chinned petrel.

Auckland shag

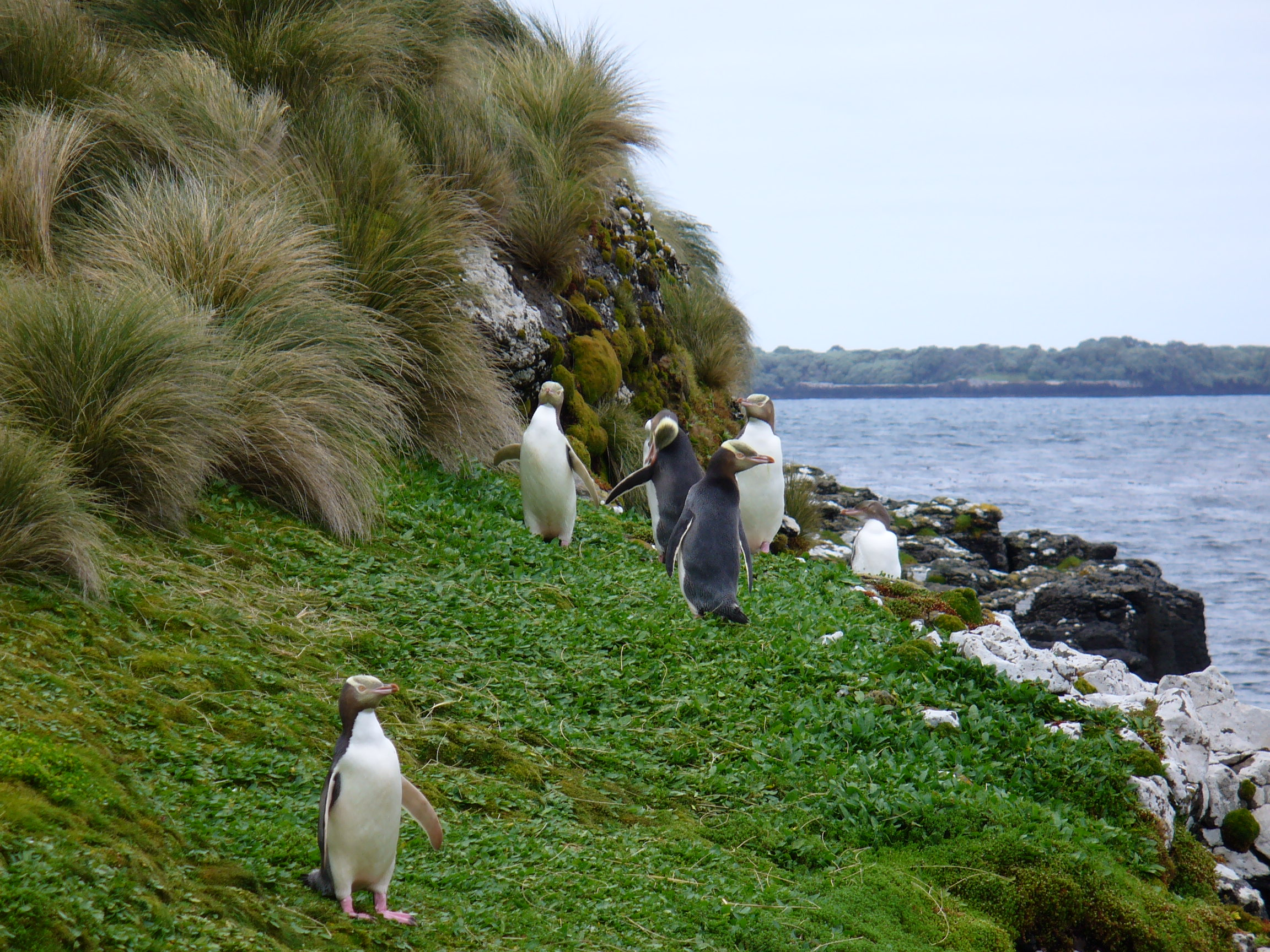
Yellow-eyed penguins on Enderby Island

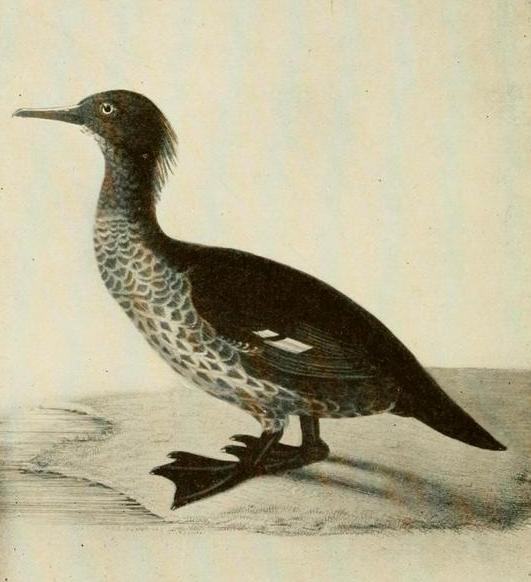
Extinct New Zealand merganser

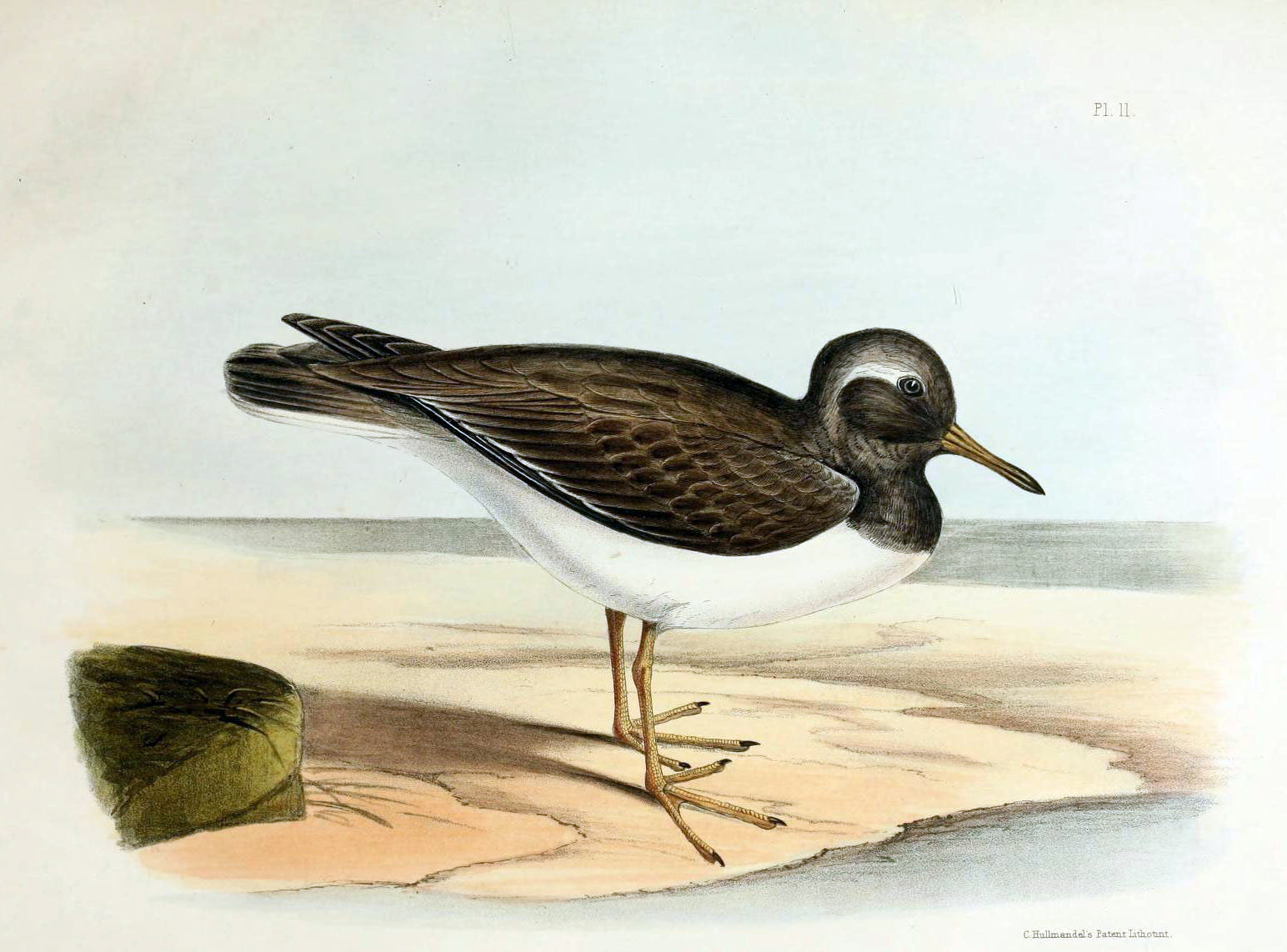
Locally extinct shore plover, once thought a separate species

=== Ecological history ===
Several introduced species have come to the islands; goats, other useful animals and seed were brought to the islands by Captains Musgrave and Norman 1865, returning to search for castaways; ecologists eliminated or allowed to go extinct cattle, sheep, goats, dogs, possums and rabbits in the 1990s, but feral cats, pigs and mice remain on Auckland Island. The last rabbits on Enderby Island were removed in 1993 through the application of poison, also eradicating mice there. Curiously, rats have never colonised the islands, in spite of numerous visits and shipwrecks and their ubiquity on other islands. Introduced species have significantly negatively altered habitats and ecosystem processes, suppressed vegetation, and reduced or extirpated birds on many of the islands. They have, for example, caused the extinction of the New Zealand merganser, a duck formerly widespread in southern New Zealand, and ultimately confined to the islands until its extinction.

The New Zealand Department of Conservation plans to remove the last remaining introduced mammals from Auckland Island, making the entire island group pest-free, in what would be one of the largest multi-species eradication plans in the world. This project started in November 2018, with NZ$2 million of initial scoping work. The total cost for the eradication could stretch to NZ$40–50 million over 10 years.

== List of endemic animals ==
- Auckland Island wētā (Dendroplectron aucklandensis)
- Auckland Islands cockle (Austrovenus aucklandica)
- Auckland rail (Lewinia muelleri)
- Auckland snipe (Coenocorypha aucklandica aucklandica)
- Auckland teal (Anas aucklandica)
- Auckland shag (Leucocarbo colensoi)
- Auckland Island merganser (Mergus australis) - extinct
- Auckland Island tomtit (Petroica macrocephala marrineri)
- Auckland Island banded dotterel (Charadrius bicinctus exilis)
- Gibson's albatross (Diomedea antipodensis gibsoni)

== List of endemic plants ==
- Azorella schizeilema
- Callitriche aucklandica
- Cardamine depressa subsp. depressa
- Cardamine latior
- Dracophyllum cockayneanum
- Gentianella cerina
- Gentianella concinna
- Geum albiflorum
- Plantago aucklandica
- Poa aucklandica subsp. aucklandica

== Legal status ==
The Auckland Islands – as with all of New Zealand's subantarctic islands – is a National Nature Reserve, afforded the highest possible level of protection under New Zealand law. In addition, a marine reserve encompasses all of the Auckland Islands territorial sea and internal waterways.

All of New Zealand's subantarctic islands are managed by the Southland Conservancy of the Department of Conservation (DOC). Expedition party size, length of stay and landing on the islands are kept to a minimum. Entry is by permit only and applicants must undergo thorough pre-expedition quarantine checks.

When Andrew Fagan made a solo voyage there in a 5.4 metres (18 ft) plywood yacht (and nearly added to the shipwreck tally), he described the DOC permitting process thus:

Not just anyone can go to the Auckland Islands. They are now regarded as special environmentally preserved pieces of land, and to be allowed to go there and touch them, you have to be special as well... Not only, me, but the boat as well… I had been directed to Bluff or Dunedin (the choice was mine) to have the bottom of SW inspected by divers to ensure no nasty invasive seaweeds like Undaria were hitching a ride south to set up an environmentally unwanted colony, like the humans had done in 1850.

— Fagan, Andrew (2012). Swirly World Sails South. Auckland, NZ: HarperCollins. p. 91. ISBN 9781869509828.

== Popular Culture ==
The Auckland Islands feature prominently in the plot of the 1955 Hollywood movie The Sea Chase starring John Wayne and Lana Turner.

== See also ==
- Composite Gazetteer of Antarctica
- Scientific Committee on Antarctic Research
- Territorial claims in Antarctica
- List of Antarctic and subantarctic islands
- List of islands of New Zealand
- Horn Island, Tierra del Fuego, the most southerly pre-European archaeological site.
