= Beacon Rock =

Beacon Rock may refer to:

- Beacon Rock (Auckland Islands), New Zealand
- Beacon Rock (Canterbury), New Zealand
- Beacon Rock State Park, United States
