= Enderby Island cattle =

Breed of cattle

Enderby Island Cattle are a breed of cattle that existed in a wild state in isolation on Enderby Island, New Zealand for over 80 years. Only about seven specimens remain today (all on mainland New Zealand), after a rescue expedition by the Rare Breeds Conservation Society of New Zealand (RBCSNZ), and a culling program to protect the native flora and fauna of Enderby Island. There have since been intensive efforts at breeding the cattle, involving both in vitro fertilisation and cloning, and there is an ongoing program to perpetuate the breed in captivity.

== History ==
Nine cattle (the exact breed remains obscure) were introduced to Enderby Island, the northernmost of the subantarctic Auckland Islands group, in the 1890s when an attempt was made to establish farming on the island. The attempt failed because of the climate, with the island being abandoned in 1910 and the cattle left behind. Over the 80 years of subsequent isolation the cattle survived well despite the harsh climate, feeding on Enderby's scrub vegetation, southern rātā, and seaweed, evolving to cope with the environment. Cattle had been released earlier, also, in an effort to provide food for castaways.

In 1991, New Zealand's Department of Conservation decided that species introduced to the Auckland Islands, including cattle and rabbits, should be culled in the course of a program to restore the natural ecosystem. An expedition that year eradicated 47 of an estimated 53 cattle on the island. Genetic material (oocytes and epididymal sperm) was taken and stored. A 1992 expedition by the RBCSNZ, to rescue live specimens of the Enderby Island Rabbit, found tracks of two remaining cattle, a cow and her calf, which were later captured and transferred to New Zealand.

== Description ==
The cattle originally introduced to Enderby Island were described (in the ship's log) as 'shorthorn'. However, their descendants do not look much like modern shorthorns and are more similar to Shetland cattle. They are typically black and white, but three of the 47 cattle culled in 1991 were described as being red and white, and they were probably not a pure breed originally. They are small cattle with long bodies and short legs, giving them a distinctive appearance.

== See also ==
- Campbell Island cattle
