= Invercauld =

Invercauld may refer to:

- Invercauld (ship), ship wrecked on the Auckland Islands, New Zealand in 1864
- Invercauld Castle, country house situated in Royal Deeside near Braemar in Scotland
