= Rare Breeds Conservation Society of New Zealand =

RBCSNZ logo.

The Rare Breeds Conservation Society of New Zealand (RBCSNZ) was founded in 1988 to conserve, record and promote rare livestock breeds with the aim of maintaining genetic diversity within livestock species. The area of coverage is broad, and includes poultry as well as camelids, cattle, chinchillas, deer, donkeys, goats, horses, pigs, rabbits and sheep.

== Auckland Islands expeditions ==
Projects carried out by the RBCSNZ have included expeditions to the subantarctic Auckland Islands group to rescue live specimens of the introduced but long-isolated populations of Enderby Island Rabbits, Enderby Island Cattle and Auckland Island Pigs for captive breeding in New Zealand before their eradication from the Auckland Islands in the course of conservation management.

== See also ==
- Category:Animal breeds originating in New Zealand
- Agriculture in New Zealand
