= Invercauld (ship) =

Scottish sailing vessel

- Three-masted barque sail plan

History

United Kingdom
- Name: Invercauld
- Owner: Richard Connor & Co
- Port of registry: Aberdeen
- Builder: John Smith & Co, Aberdeen
- Yard number: 45218
- Launched: 28 October 1863
- Maiden voyage: 10 January 1864
- Fate: Wrecked 11 May 1864

General characteristics
- Type: Barque
- Tonnage: 888 GRT
- Length: 181.7 ft (55.4 m)
- Beam: 34.1 ft (10.4 m)
- Depth: 20.8 ft (6.3 m)
- Propulsion: Full sail
- Sail plan: Square rigged

Invercauld was a three-masted barque built in 1863 that was wrecked on the Auckland Islands in May 1864. The ship left Melbourne, Victoria for Callao, Peru on 2 May 1864. During a severe gale south off New Zealand, the ship hit the northwestern tip of Auckland Island at 2 a.m. on 11 May 1864 and swiftly broke up. Of the 25 crew, six were lost in the wreck. The survivors were washed ashore and subsisted on plant roots and shellfish for a little over a year. By the time of their rescue only three of the crew were still alive: Captain George Dalgarno, Ship's Mate Andrew Smith, and one seaman, Robert Holding. The three surviving crew members of the ship were finally rescued by the Julian, a Portuguese ship that had sent a boat to shore to obtain repairs for a leak on the ship.

== Construction ==
Invercauld was a three-masted barque of 888 GRT, built by John Smith & Co, Aberdeen. She was constructed using timber from Ballochbuie forest on the Invercauld estate, and was launched on 28 October 1863. Invercauld was 55.4 m (181.7 ft) in length, with a beam of 10.4 m (34.1 ft). Her maiden voyage from London to Melbourne departed on 10 January 1864 and arrived on 15 April 1864.

== Wreck ==
The Invercauld left Melbourne in ballast on 2 May 1864, for Callao, Peru, to take on cargo there for England. She was under the command of Captain George Dalgarno, with a total of 25 crew. During a severe gale south of New Zealand, she struck Auckland Island at 2 a.m. on 11 May 1864, broke up and was totally destroyed in a short amount of time. The crew all struggled towards a small cove nearby, and 19 of the 25 crew managed to get ashore. Crew members Middleton and Wilson and four others drowned. All of the rest were hurt in some way and had no shoes. The survivors spent the night onshore and then at daybreak investigated the scene of the wreck and came away with only some few pounds of ships biscuits and salted pork. They found the bodies of the drowned crew and stripped them of their clothing but were unable to bury them.

The crew had enough timber to build a rough hut and, as one of the crew had matches, a fire was able to be lit. After four days of inactivity there were no remaining provisions, so three men climbed the cliffs in search of food. The climb was very difficult as the cliffs were at least 2,000 feet (610 m) high and rocky under foot. Eventually the entire group of survivors, save one ill man and a caretaker, climbed the cliffs. The original group of three had caught a pig, which they brought back to the group. The smell of the roasting pig lured the caretaker, who left the gravely ill man to die alone on the beach. At the top of the cliffs they found fresh water and some roots. The weather was very cold with frost and snow on the ground. They spent the night and then pushed on towards Port Ross, a journey that took several days due to the thickness of the scrub. They managed to hunt a single pig for food and continued to travel, losing another man to cold and hunger. They arrived on the other side of the island and set up a shelter but for 21 days had nothing to eat except roots and water. Seven men decided to return to the wreck and the group saw nothing more of them.

Andrew Smith and four others left the remaining five crew to search for the beach through thick bush. They were able to get to the beach and harvest shellfish and sent a man back to fetch the others only to find that another two had died. The group reunited and the eight men stayed on the beach for about a week. A group of five continued to explore and reached Port Ross, where they found the traces of the abandoned Enderby Settlement and huts. One man again went back for the others. By this time the group was getting very weak and lost a further two men leaving Captain Dalgarno, the mate Andrew Smith, the carpenter Alex Henderson and three seamen Robert Holding, George Liddle and James Lancefield at Port Ross.

After three or four months the supply of shellfish was exhausted and seals were rarely seen or captured. The group, now down to three surviving members, constructed a canoe from seal skins and tree branches and waited for fine weather to cross to Rose Island. Here they found rabbits and they also built a sod cabin with a thatched roof. Henderson, Liddle and Lancefield died before this time and were buried in the sand.

== Cannibalism ==
At least one man from the Invercauld resorted to cannibalism. Robert Holding, one of only three survivors, reported that two men (Fred "Fritz" Hawser and William Hervey, known as "Harvey") got into an altercation late one night. Harvey admitted to throwing Fritz out of their primitive stick shelter, because he was being a "nuisance". Fritz hit the ground face first, and was found dead in that position the next morning. Several days later Holding discovered "Harvey had been eating some of Fritz." Sixty years later Holding wrote that this horrible episode was still burned into his memory.

== Rescue ==
On 20 May 1865, the Portuguese ship Julian entered the harbour. The ship had sprung a leak and sent a boat to shore in the hopes of obtaining repairs. The three survivors were taken aboard the Julian and safely transported to Callao. The Julian didn't search for other castaways, possibly because the ship was taking on water and needed to get to harbour for repairs.

== Crew list ==
The list of the crew at the time of the wreck was:

- George Dalgarno (Captain) (survived)
- Andrew Smith (Chief Mate) (survived)
- James Mahoney (Second mate)
- Alex. Henderson of Aberdeen (carpenter)
- Richard Peenbo
- W. Bonner
- Juan Lagos
- William Goble
- W. Cowan
- Jacob T. Turner
- John Peterson
- James Lancefield of Aberdeen
- John Wilson of Aberdeen (drowned)
- William Middleton of Aberdeen (drowned)
- George Liddle of Aberdeen
- John Maloney
- Robert Holding (Seaman) (survived)
- W. Hipwell
- John W. Tait
- Thomas Page
- William Hervey
- James Sutherland
- John Teasen
- Aug. Bruns
- Fritz Hawser
- Alex. Burns

== Comparison with the wreck of the Grafton ==
The wreck of the Invercauld occurred four months after the wreck of the Grafton at the south of Auckland Island. Both vessels had survivors on Auckland Island at the same time but at different ends of the island. The two groups of survivors were unaware of each others' existence until the Flying Scud visited to pick up the last two of the Grafton castaways.

Both groups had some good luck: the Grafton wrecked at the end of the island with more seals, but the Invercauld crew found the remains of a deserted settlement with partial houses, tools, metal and timber. It has been suggested that the Grafton group was better resourced and much better organised. They retrieved larger stocks of food, a dinghy with which to travel around the coast, a gun to shoot birds and also had a wreck from which to salvage useful material. Rather than abandoning ship immediately when their ship wrecked in the dark, they waited till morning when one sailor swam to shore carrying a rope. Consequently, they were able to save not only their critically ill shipmate, François Édouard Raynal, but an assortment of supplies.

In contrast, when the Invercauld wrecked after nearly 3 hours of distress, there was no preparation, no call to abandon ship, the ship's three small boats weren't launched, the Captain and officers were shouting impossible and contradictory orders, and a sick young crewman was left on board to drown. The Invercauld group came ashore with nothing more than the clothes on their backs, a little food and two damp boxes of matches which happened to be in someone's pockets.
