= Adams Rocks (New Zealand) =

Outlying island of New Zealand

- Interactive map of Adams Rocks

Geography
- Coordinates: 50.85468°S 165.89936°E

Administration
- New Zealand

Demographics
- Population: uninhabited

Adams Rocks is an island of the Auckland Islands in New Zealand.

== See also ==
- Adams Island
