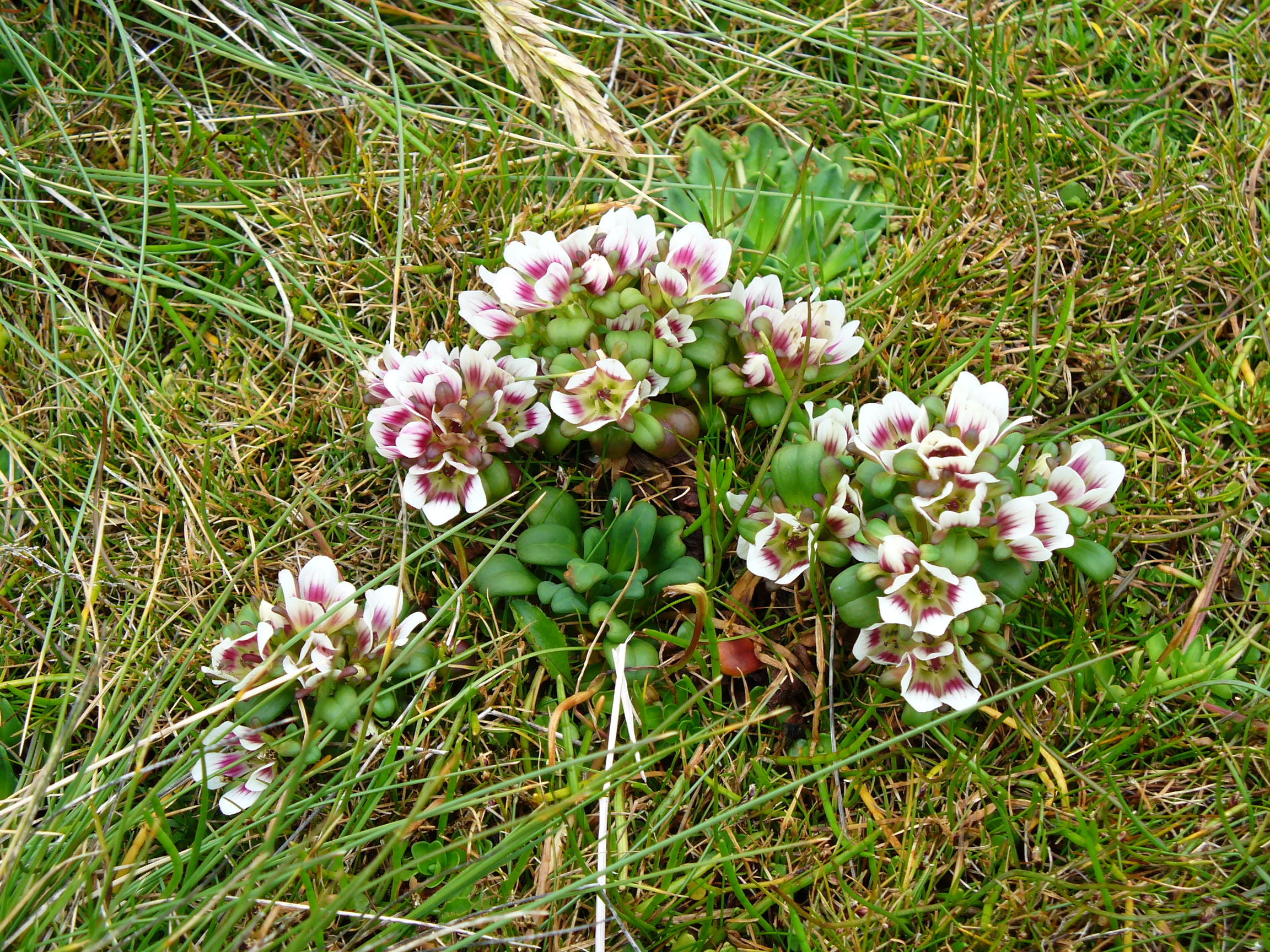

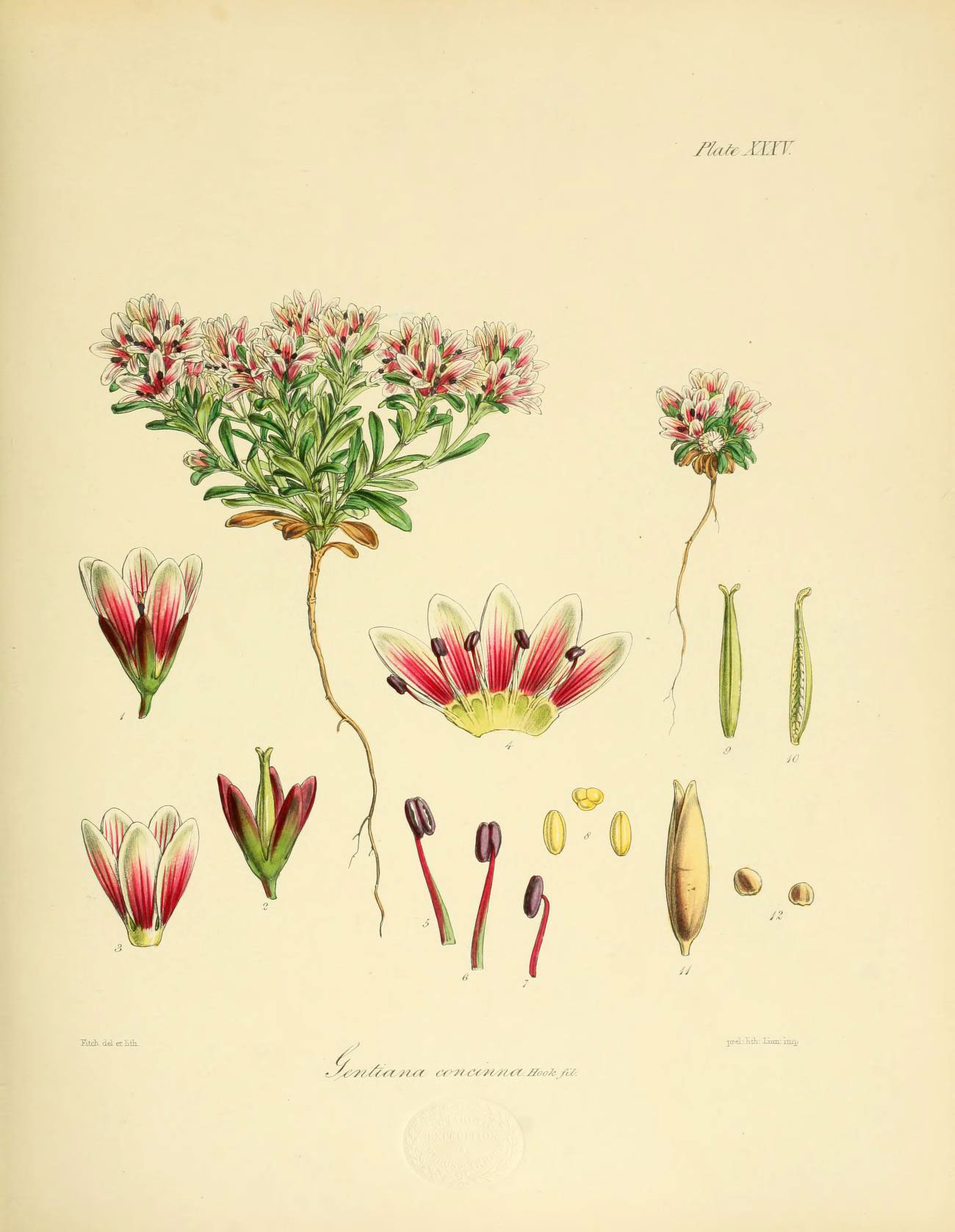
- Plate XXXV

Conservation status
- Naturally Uncommon (NZ TCS)

Scientific classification
- Kingdom: Plantae
- Clade: Tracheophytes
- Clade: Angiosperms
- Clade: Eudicots
- Clade: Asterids
- Order: Gentianales
- Family: Gentianaceae
- Genus: Gentianella
- Species: G. concinna

Binomial name
- Gentianella concinna Hook.f. T.N.Ho & S.W.Liu

Synonyms
- Chionogentias concinna (Hook.f.) L.G.Adams; Gentiana cerina var. concinna (Hook.f.) Kirk; Gentiana concinna Hook.f.

= Gentianella concinna =

Species of flowering plant in New Zealand

Gentianella concinna is a flowering plant species, endemic to the Auckland Islands of New Zealand.

== Description ==
It is an annual plant with much-branched stems up to 12 cm (5 in) long. The leaves are fleshy and leathery, oblong-spatheolate to linear-oblong in shape, gradually narrowing into broad, flat petioles. The basal leaves are about 8–20 mm (0.3–0.8 in) by 3–7 mm (0.1–0.3 in) wide; the cauline leaves are smaller. The flowers are borne singly in the axils of the upper leaves. The corollas are red, or white streaked with red or purple, and are about 8–12 mm (0.3–0.5 in) long. The calyces are about one third the length of the corollas.

== Taxonomy ==
It was first described in 1844 by Joseph Dalton Hooker as Gentiana concinna. Its currently accepted name is Gentianella concinna, having been assigned to the genus Gentianella by the authors, Ho and Liu in 1993.

== Conservation status ==
In both 2009 and 2012 it was deemed to be "At Risk - Naturally Uncommon" under the New Zealand Threat Classification System, and this classification was reaffirmed in 2018, due to the species being an island endemic and having a restricted range.
