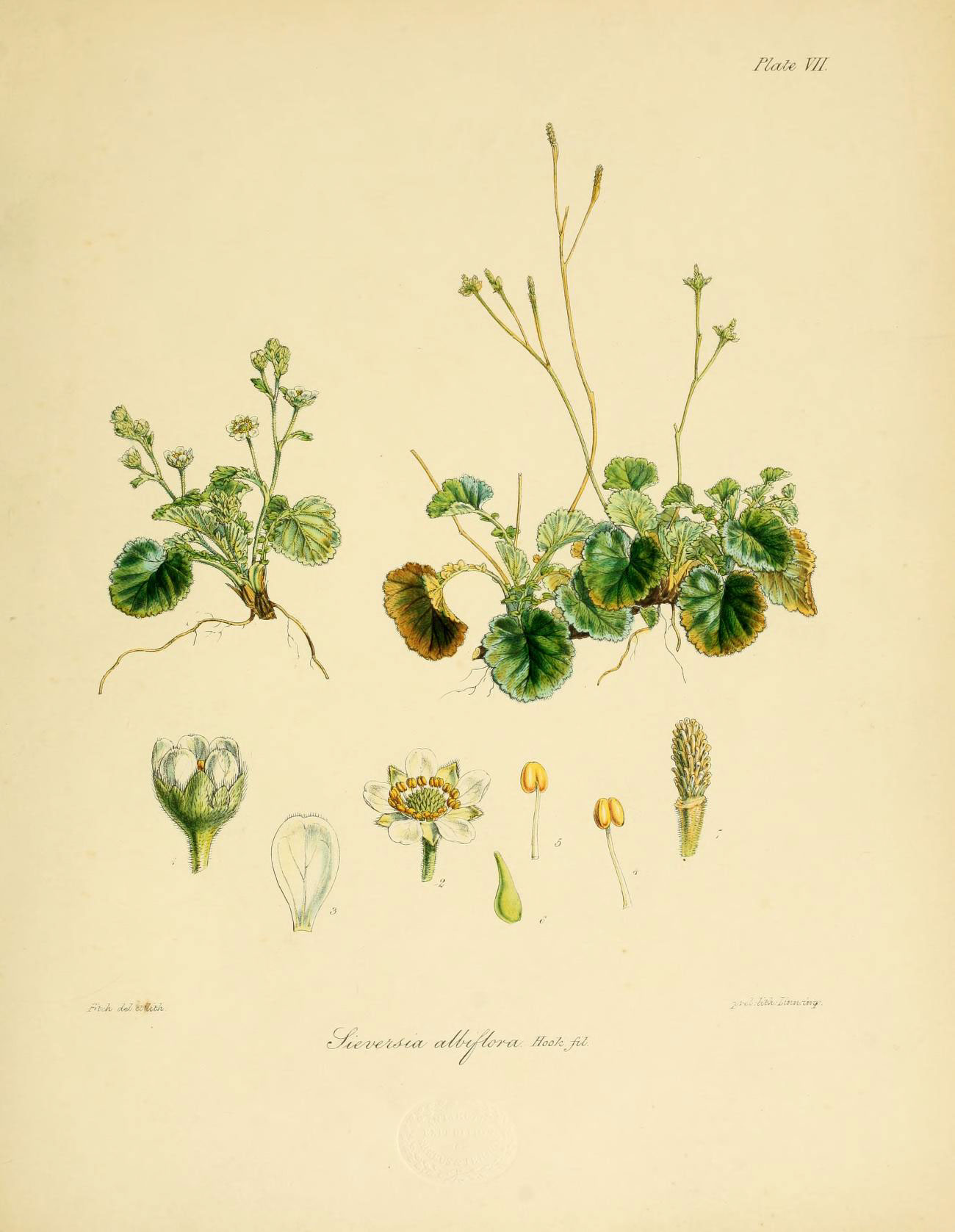
- Plate VII (Hooker, 1844)

Conservation status
- Naturally Uncommon (NZ TCS)

Scientific classification
- Kingdom: Plantae
- Clade: Tracheophytes
- Clade: Angiosperms
- Clade: Eudicots
- Clade: Rosids
- Order: Rosales
- Family: Rosaceae
- Genus: Geum
- Species: G. albiflorum

Binomial name
- Geum albiflorum (Hook.f.) Scheutz

= Geum albiflorum =

Species of flowering plant

Geum albiflorum is a plant in the rose family, Rosaceae family, found in the Auckland Islands.

== Description ==
Geum albiflorum is a rosette forming herb, with kidney-shaped leaves which are 2–3 cm long and minutely lobed or crenate. The leaves are hairy and rough on below, with silky hairs on the upper side. It flowers in racemes, subtended by bracteoles. The petals are white, and just fractionally longer than the calyx.

== Habitat ==
It is found on cliff faces and on rock covered ground. Hooker found it "on rocky places in the hills" at altitudes of 1,000 feet (300 m).

== Conservation status ==
In both 2009 and 2012 it was deemed to be "At Risk - Naturally Uncommon" under the New Zealand Threat Classification System, and this New Zealand classification was reaffirmed in 2018, with the further comments that its range is restricted and it is an island endemic.
