= Grafton (ship) =

Schooner

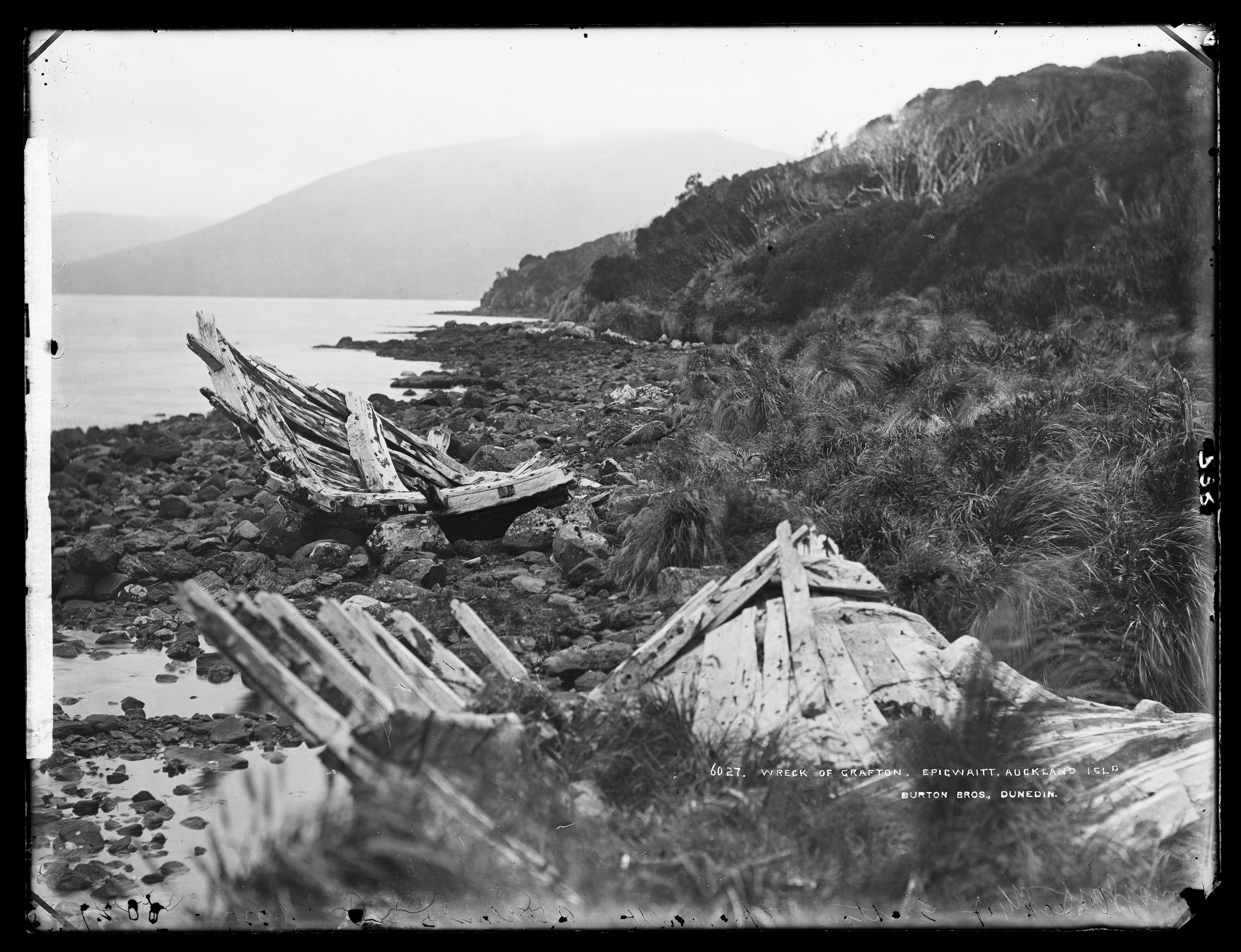
- Wreck of Grafton, Epigwaitt, Auckland Islands

History
- Name: Grafton
- Stricken: 3 January 1864

General characteristics
- Class & type: schooner

Grafton was a 56-ton schooner sailing out of Sydney during the 1860s that was wrecked on 3 January 1864 in the north arm of Carnley Harbour, Auckland Island, one of the New Zealand Subantarctic Islands, nearly 480 kilometres (300 mi) south of the South Island. Her castaway crew waited a year for a ship to come to their rescue, which, it soon became apparent, would not come. Six months later, three men decided to set out in a dinghy and managed to cross a distance of 450 kilometres (280 mi) to Stewart Island, 30 kilometres (20 mi) south of New Zealand's South Island. They then funded a rescue mission to pick up their remaining companions. The crew spent a total of 18 months on the sub-Antarctic island and, despite their ordeal, all survived.

== Last voyage ==
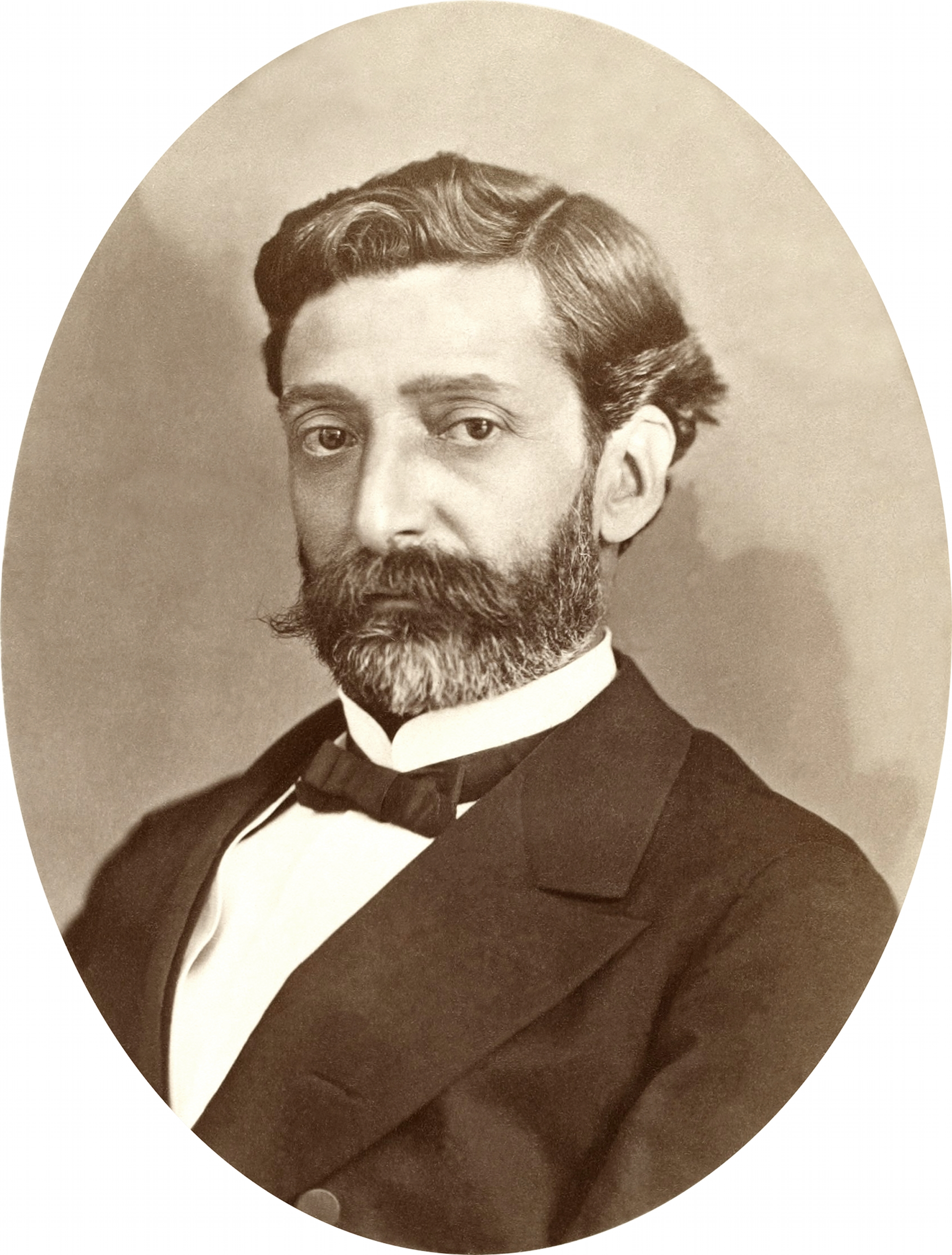
François Édouard Raynal

Grafton was hired by a business consortium of Francois Edouard Raynal, Captain Thomas Musgrave, Charles Sarpy and Musgrave's uncle for a voyage to Campbell Island and the Auckland Islands to investigate mining and sealing opportunities.

Raynal had spent six years at sea and eleven years in the Australian goldfields before a mine collapse had necessitated his move to Sydney for recuperation. He had decided to return to France when he was approached by a friend who had good grounds for believing that a mine of argentiferous tin existed in Campbell Island. The friend, a draper known as Charles Sarpy, and his business partner suggested that Raynal could survey this island and discover the mine.

Even if no mine was discovered it was suggested that Raynal could take advantage of the large number of seals and hunt them for skins and oil. Raynal agreed to the proposition but on the understanding that he would not undertake the command of the vessel. Sarpy's partner suggested his nephew for the command and Thomas Musgrave was offered the command of the ship.

The ship left Sydney for the Campbell Islands on 12 November 1863, with a crew of five. After reaching Campbell Island, Raynal fell very ill and was unable to complete his survey for the tin. Musgrave carried on with the search but was unable to find any trace of tin. With limited numbers of seals and an unsuccessful search for tin at Campbell Island the crew headed to Auckland Islands to hunt seals.

=== Shipwreck ===
Grafton entered one of the sounds of the Auckland Islands on 31 December. A heavy gale came on New Year's Day of 1864, which continued into midnight of 2 January when the anchor chains parted, and the vessel struck a rocky beach and foundered.

The crew were able to get ashore and managed to salvage food, tools, navigation equipment, Raynal's gun, powder and shot and canvas as well as other material from the wreck. Despite only being provisioned for two months they survived for a year and a half on seal meat, birds, fish and water. They originally made a tent from portions of the spars and sails of the wreck before building a permanent cabin from wreck timber and stone.

Raynal had experience in building huts from his time in the goldfields and guided the crew in building a solid cabin with a stone chimney, furnished with stretchers, a dining table and writing desk. However it took some time to build as the only available tools were an axe, an adze, a hammer and a gimlet. The men named the cabin "Epigwaitt", an American Indian word meaning "a dwelling by the water" suggested by Musgrave.

The men manufactured clothes from sealskin and hunted and fished for food. For entertainment Captain Musgrave started reading classes and Raynal manufactured a chess set, dominoes and a pack of cards. However he found Musgrave to be such a bad loser that he judged it best to destroy the cards.

To help ward off scurvy as well as to provide some variety to their diet, Raynal was even able to brew "a passable beer" from the Stilbocarpa rhizomes which were abundant on the island, boiling and then fermenting them in their own sugar.

Captain Musgrave and Raynal had both been hopeful that a ship would be sent by their business partners to investigate what had happened to Grafton, but after 12 months without sighting a single ship, the decision was taken to use the timbers from the wreck to "make something that will carry us to New Zealand". The crew used the tools they had salvaged from the wreck and Raynal created a pair of blacksmith's bellows from metal from the wreck, wood and sealskin.

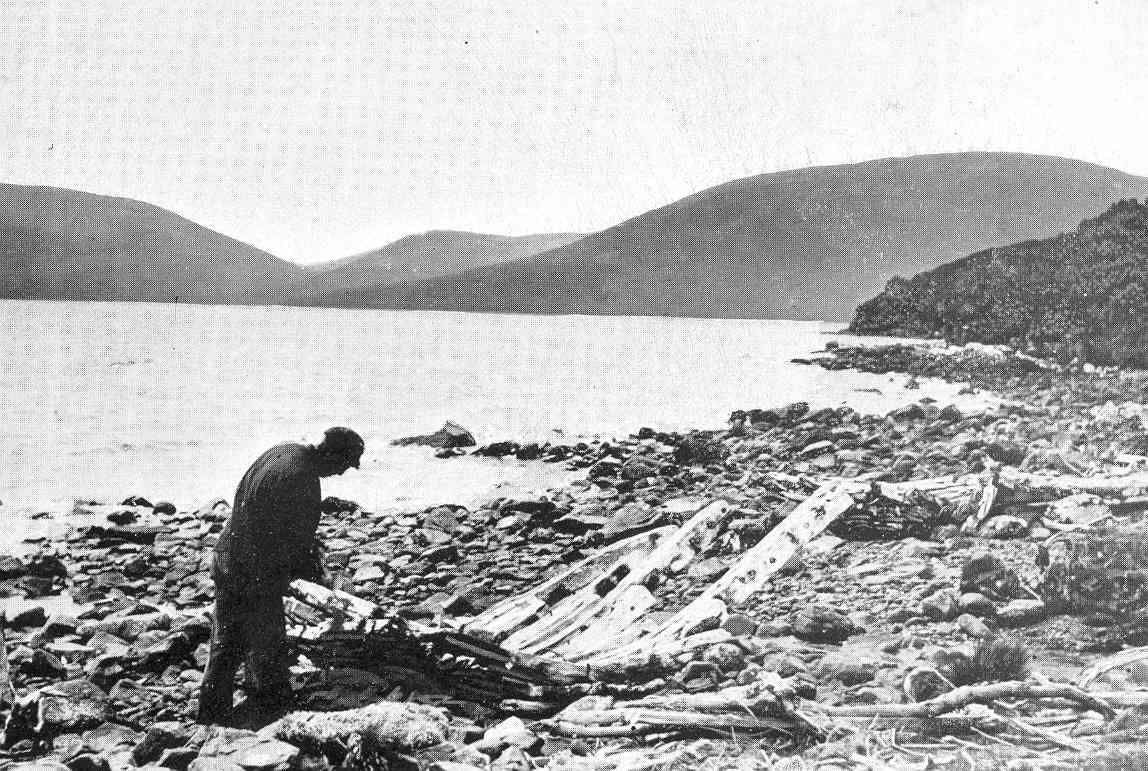
Remains of the Grafton at Carnley Harbour

He used the bellows to forge more tools from metal from the wreck. The castaways had made progress on sections of the proposed vessel but were unable to complete it as Raynal found it impossible to manufacture an auger despite a number of attempts. The seals were less numerous than the previous year and the castaways were facing another winter with a greater threat of starvation. The decision was taken to work on the ship's clinker dinghy. They enlarged the dinghy by raising the gunwales, adding a false keel and decking it over. Captain Musgrave made sails from the Grafton's sails which had previously been on the roof of the cabin.

When they tested the boat they found that it was too unsteady with five men so Musgrave was forced to leave Harris and Forgés behind. Musgrave, Raynal, and McLaren then set sail on 19 July 1865, arriving at Port Adventure, Stewart Island on 24 July, after five days of bad weather. Captain Cross of Flying Scud took them into his house for a meal, a warm bath and a good night's sleep and then sailed them to Invercargill the next day.

Public fundraising in Invercargill raised enough funds for Captain Musgrave to pay Captain Cross of Flying Scud to return him to the Auckland Islands to rescue his two remaining crew members. After successfully retrieving Harris and Forgés, Musgrave returned to Invercargill and reunited all the crew. Musgrave also fetched Raynal's bellows back for him. McLaren, Raynal and Forgés returned to Melbourne on the schooner Swordfish; Musgrave returned on a steamer captained by a friend of his; Harris remained in New Zealand and headed for the gold fields.

Captain Musgrave had kept a diary while being on the island. When he ran out of ink, he continued writing with seal's blood. Both Musgrave and Raynal wrote books about their experience. Raynal's pair of blacksmith's bellows, a pair of boots made of tanned sealskin, and a needle made of bone from the wing of an albatross are said to be in the collection of Melbourne Museum.

== Invercauld ==
The wreck of Grafton occurred four months before the wreck of Invercauld. Both vessels had survivors on the Auckland Islands at the same time but at different ends of the main island. The two groups of survivors were unaware of each other's existence until the Flying Scud visited to pick up the last two of the Grafton castaways. Smoke from a fire was spotted but not investigated.

When Flying Scud visited Erebus Cove the crew found the body of a man lying beside the ruins of a house. The man had been dead for some time. The house was one of the Enderby Settlement buildings but the identity of the body was a mystery (the corpse was the 2nd mate of the Invercauld, James Mahoney). A roofing slate beside the man had some mostly illegible writing on it, (Musgrave "- a slate on which were scratched some hieroglyphical zig-zags, perhaps written by the poor fellow when dying, but of which we could decipher nothing further than the Christian name James". One foot was bound with woollen rags and the implication was that he starved after no longer being able to fend for himself.

The differences in the two castaway groups' survival rates can be put down to the Grafton group, led by Captain Musgrave, being better resourced and organised. They retrieved larger stocks of food, a dinghy with which to travel around the coast, a gun to shoot birds and seals and also had a wreck from which to salvage useful material. The Invercauld group had none of these advantages.
