= Auckland Island pig =

Breed of pig

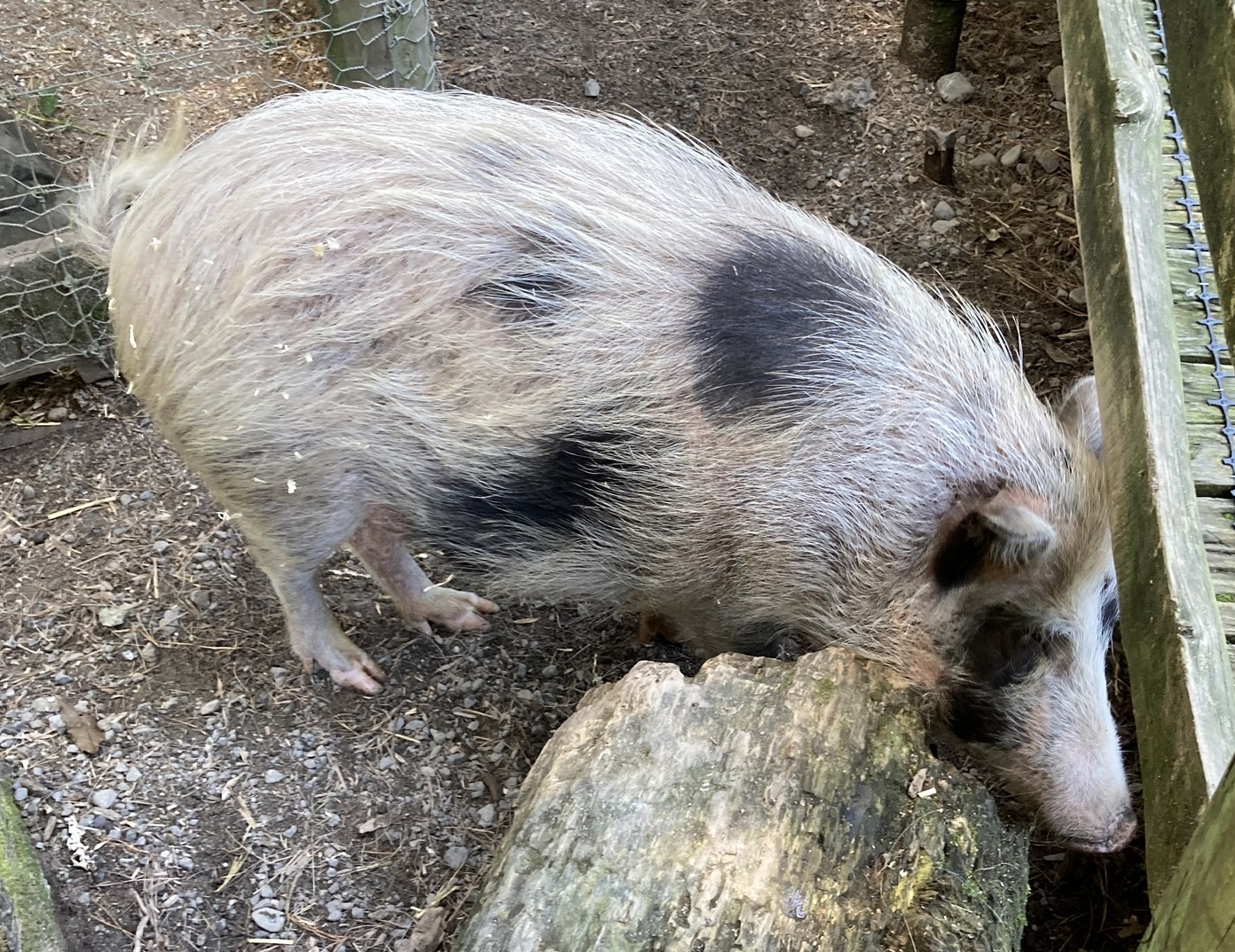
- A captive Auckland Island pig at Staglands Wildlife Reserve, Akatarawa Valley, New Zealand
- Country of origin: New Zealand
- Distribution: Auckland Island

Traits
- Weight: Male: average 41.7 kilograms (92 lb); Female: average 37.3 kilograms (82 lb)

The Auckland Island pig is a feral (but now conservation-managed) landrace of domestic pig (Sus scrofa) found on subantarctic Auckland Island, New Zealand. Its ancestors have inhabited the island since 1807, and, as an invasive species, it has had a considerable environmental impact.

== History ==
In the 18th and 19th centuries, Europeans released domestic pigs on many subantarctic islands. Various introductions of pigs were made to uninhabited Auckland as a source of food for stranded sailors or visiting whalers; the first took place in 1807, with further liberations in 1840, 1842 and the 1890s. By the end of the 19th century, the island held a thriving population of pigs of mixed origin which was largely undisturbed until the late 20th century, interbreeding to produce a distinctive local population.

== Description ==
The physical appearance and size of the pigs on Auckland Island is similar to the feral pigs located on the main island of New Zealand. They have coats of thick hair which are black, or white or brown with black markings. They also have long, narrow heads and snouts, straight tails, are relatively small and very athletic. The average weight of an adult boar is 41.7 kilograms (92 lb), and an adult sow 37.3 kilograms (82 lb).

=== Genetics ===
Population genetic variation is low within the Auckland Island pig population compared to other breeds of pigs found in Europe and Asia. These relatively pathogen-free pigs have been used to derive a biocertified herd as a source of cells for xenotransplantation.

== Behaviour and ecology ==
=== Distribution and habitat ===
As of the late 20th century, the substantial pig population occupied the whole of the island, with equal numbers of males and females. During the summer, the pigs inhabit both the coastal forest and high open country of the island, while during the winter, a majority of the pig population resides in the coastal forest and not the open country. The pigs' diet is simple, consisting mostly of plant food. In the high country, they eat a variety of different plants and earth worms. Those that inhabit the coast also eat a wide variety of plants, but their diet also includes bark, invertebrates, the remains of dead birds and sea lions, and the regurgitations of sea lions.

=== Effects on vegetation and wildlife ===
The pigs have destroyed much of the islands' flora, though remnant plant communities of Pleurophyllum, Stilbocarpa, and Anisotome are relatively safe because they are only accessible on cliffs where the pigs cannot go. Since the depletion of many plant food resources, the pig population on Auckland Island has remained relatively low. The feral pigs have also had negative effects on other wildlife throughout the island. They have dug up burrows of birds to steal their eggs such as petrels, albatrosses, mollymawks, penguins, and shags.

=== Management ===
A decision was made by New Zealand's Department of Conservation that species introduced to the Auckland Islands should be eradicated in the course of a program to restore the natural ecosystems. Consequently, the Rare Breeds Conservation Society of New Zealand (RBCSNZ) decided to attempt to preserve the population in captivity. In 1999, a RBCSNZ expedition caught and removed 17 pigs, including several pregnant sows, from Auckland Island, transferring them to Invercargill, New Zealand. These animals have since bred successfully and the variety is not at risk.
