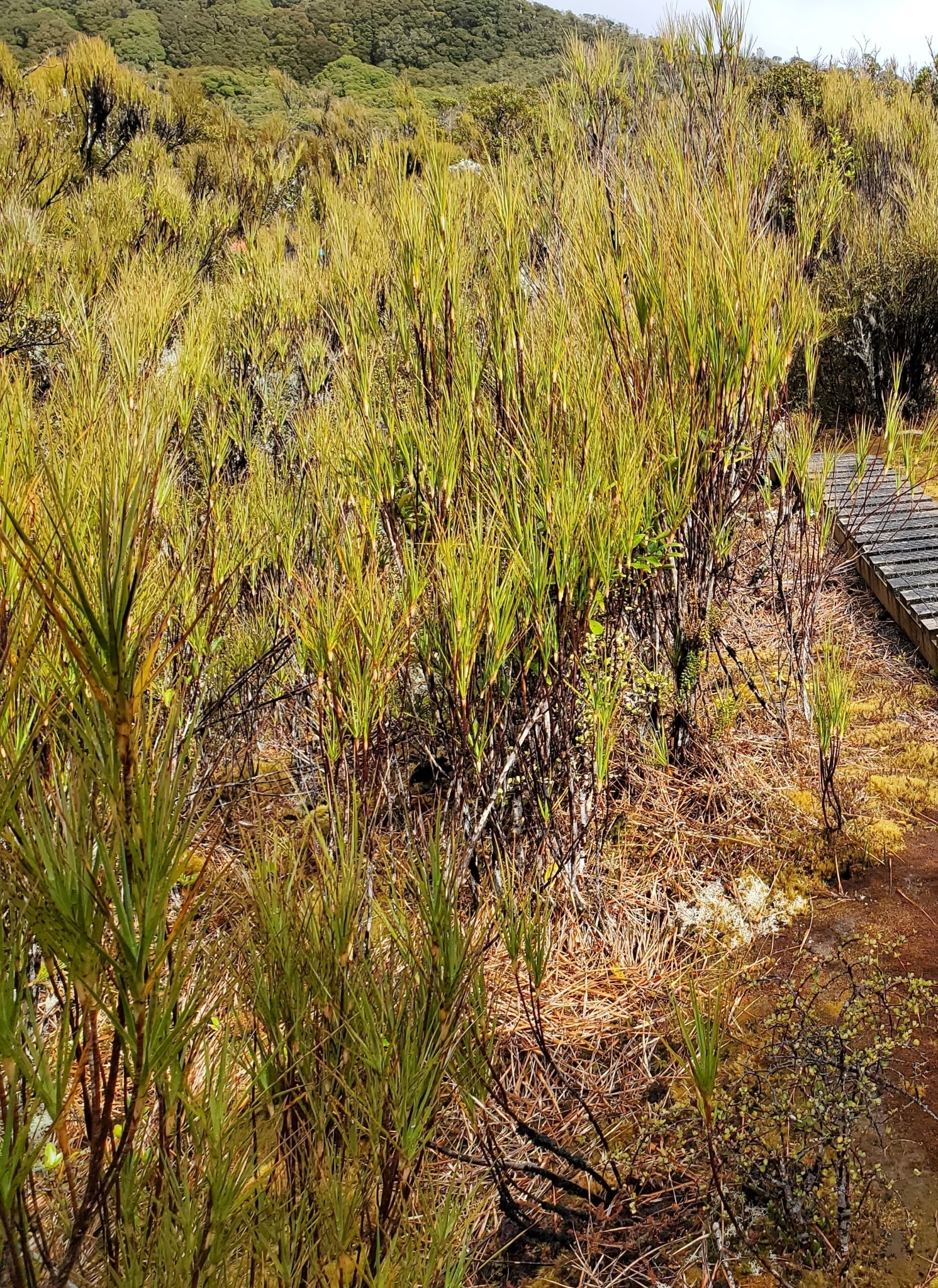
- Dracophyllum cockayneanum on Auckland Island

Scientific classification
- Kingdom: Plantae
- Clade: Tracheophytes
- Clade: Angiosperms
- Clade: Eudicots
- Clade: Asterids
- Order: Ericales
- Family: Ericaceae
- Genus: Dracophyllum
- Species: D. cockayneanum

Binomial name
- Dracophyllum cockayneanum Du Rietz

= Dracophyllum cockayneanum =

Species of flowering plant

Dracophyllum cockayneanum is a species of plant in the family Ericaceae that is endemic to the Auckland and Campbell Islands off the coast of New Zealand. It is named in honour of botanist Leonard Cockayne.

== Gallery ==
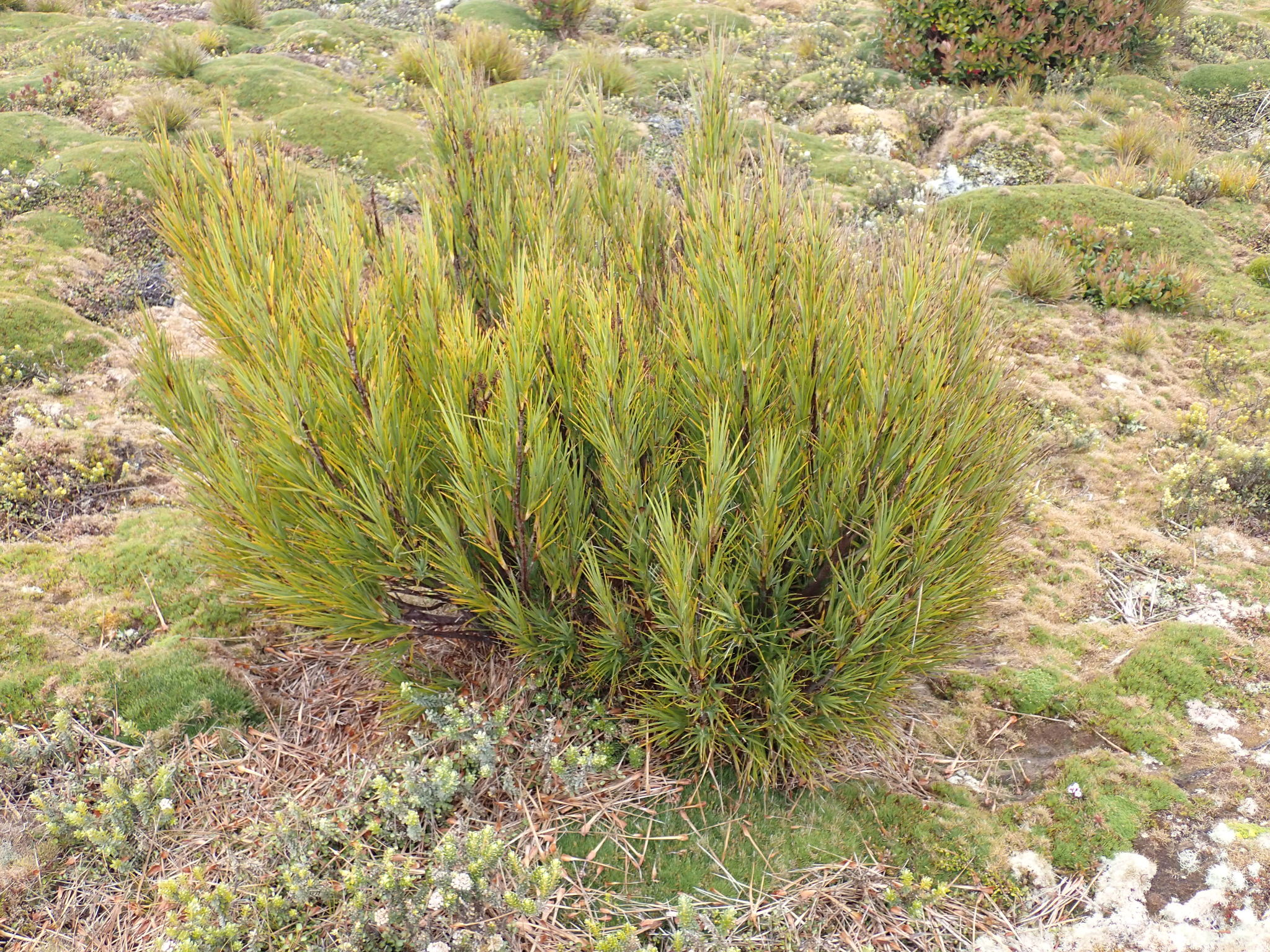
A small Dracophyllum cockayneanum on Enderby Island

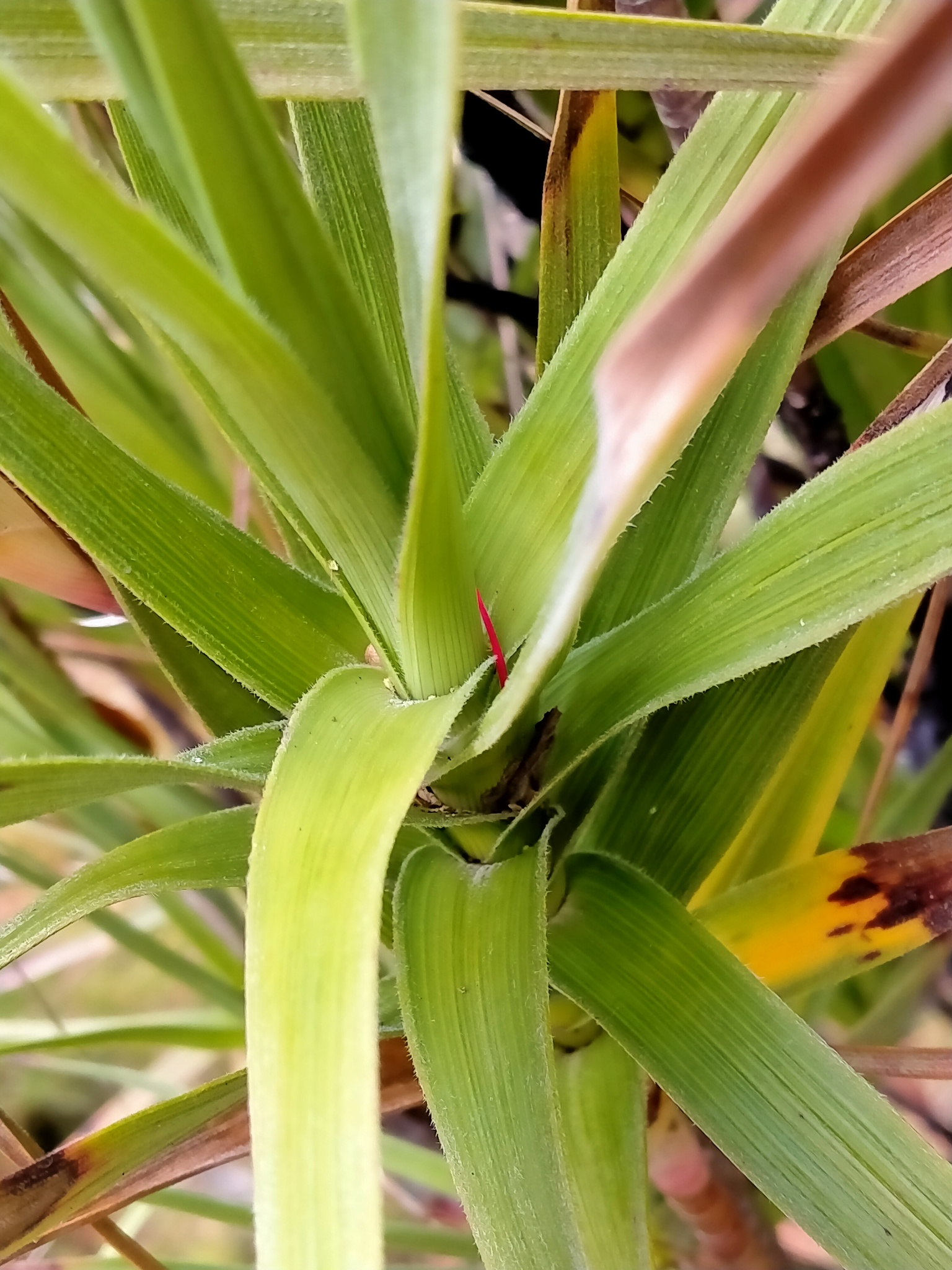
Leaves and stem of Dracophyllum cockayneanum

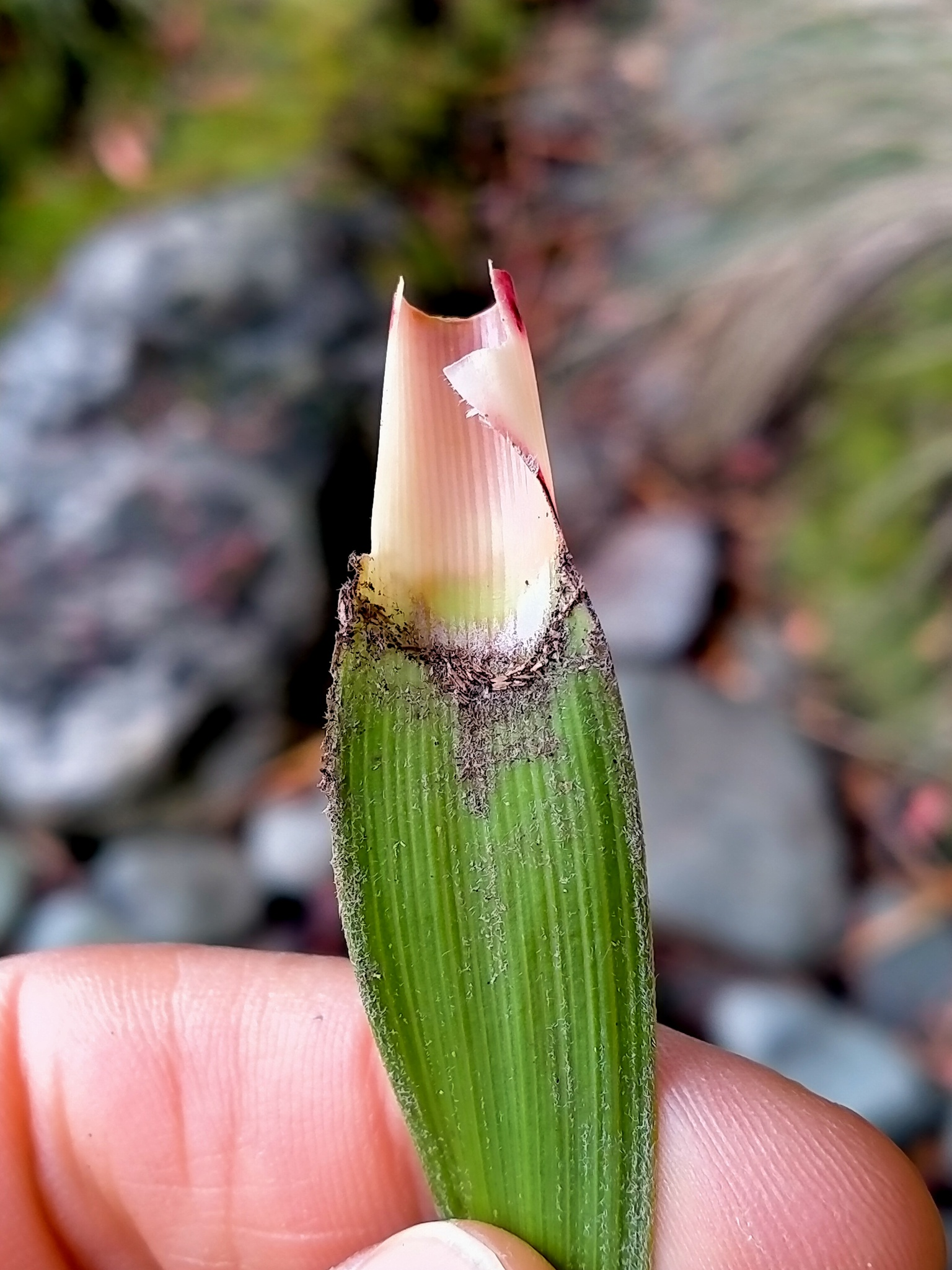
Leaves of Dracophyllum cockayneanum
