= Austrovenus aucklandica =

Scientific classification
- Kingdom: Animalia
- Phylum: Mollusca
- Class: Bivalvia
- Order: Venerida
- Superfamily: Veneroidea
- Family: Veneridae
- Genus: Austrovenus
- Species: A. aucklandica

Binomial name
- Austrovenus aucklandica Powell, 1932

Synonyms
- Chione aucklandica Powell, 1932

Species of bivalve

Austrovenus aucklandica, or the Auckland Islands cockle, is a bivalve mollusc of the family Veneridae.
