= Beacon Rock (Auckland Islands) =

Island in New Zealand

- Interactive map of Beacon Rock

Geography
- Coordinates: 50.510°S 166.138°E

Administration
- New Zealand

Demographics
- Population: uninhabited

Beacon Rock is a small island in on the north of the Auckland Islands of New Zealand.

== See also ==
- List of islands of New Zealand
