= Enderby Island rabbit =

Breed of rabbit

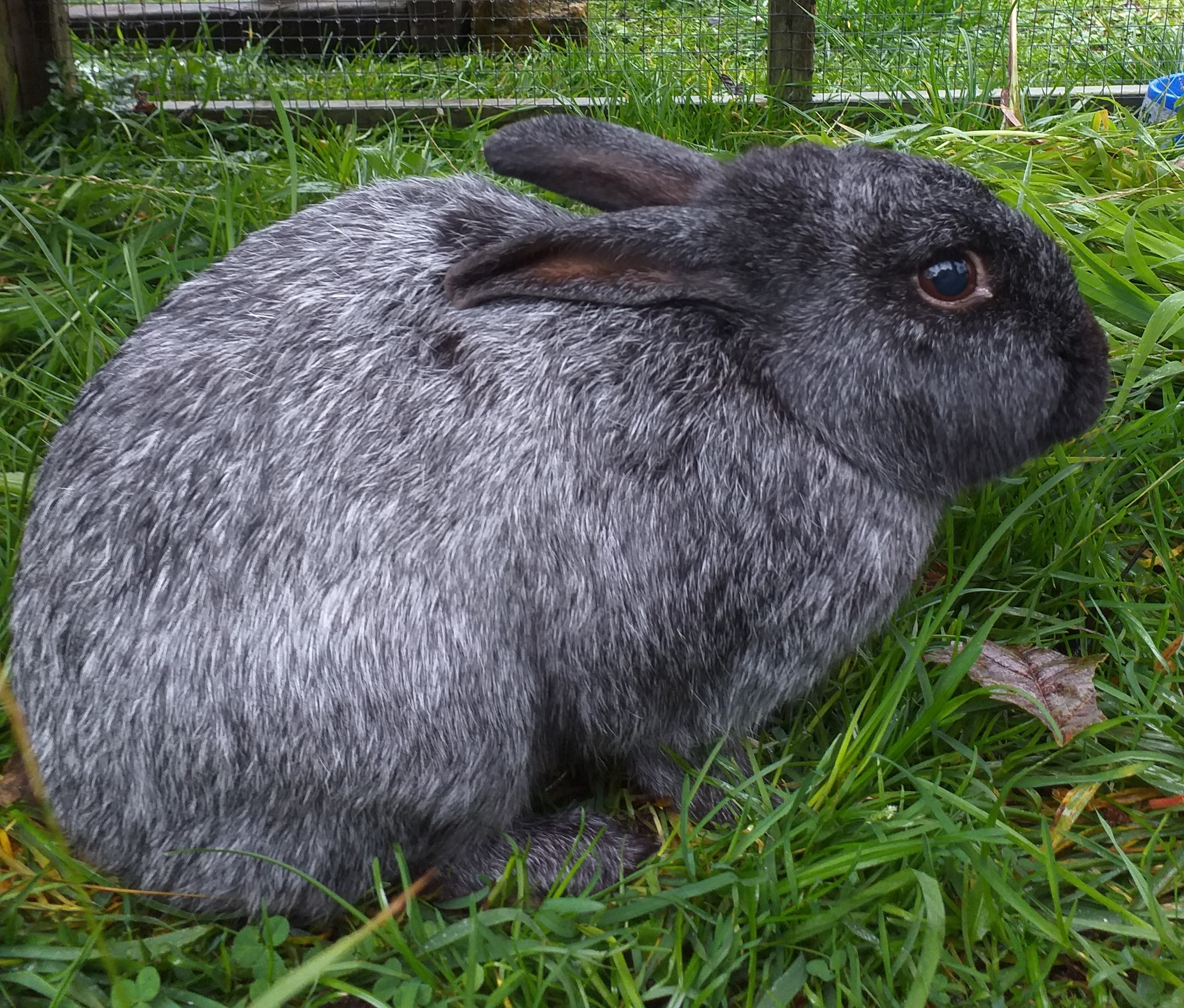
Enderby Island Rabbit with typical silver-grey colouring

The Enderby Island Rabbit, or simply Enderby rabbit or Enderby, is a rare breed of domesticated European rabbit (Oryctolagus cuniculus). It originates from rabbits introduced to Enderby Island, an uninhabited subantarctic island in New Zealand’s Auckland Islands group, from Australia in October 1865 to serve as castaway food. Over 130 years the isolated population became a distinctive variety. The rabbits were eventually exterminated for wildlife management from Enderby Island in the early 1990s, but a breeding group of 49 rabbits was rescued by the Rare Breeds Conservation Society of New Zealand in September 1992. Since then rabbit breeders have maintained numbers at around 100-150 individuals, primarily through the work of Sitereh Schouten and the Enderby Island Rabbit Club of NZ. They have ensured breed purity with pedigrees and ear tattoos which exclusively include a Z along with an individual number.

== Description ==
Enderby Island Rabbits are mainly silver-grey in colour, with an undercoat of dark slate-blue. Their heads, ears and tails are very dark, sometimes black. Because of a recessive gene, a small proportion of the rabbits are born cream or beige in colour. Adult rabbits weigh about 2 kg. Kits are born black or cream then silver ticking develops at puberty. Coat colours are described as Champagne to slate (light to dark silver) and creme.

== See also ==
- List of rabbit breeds
