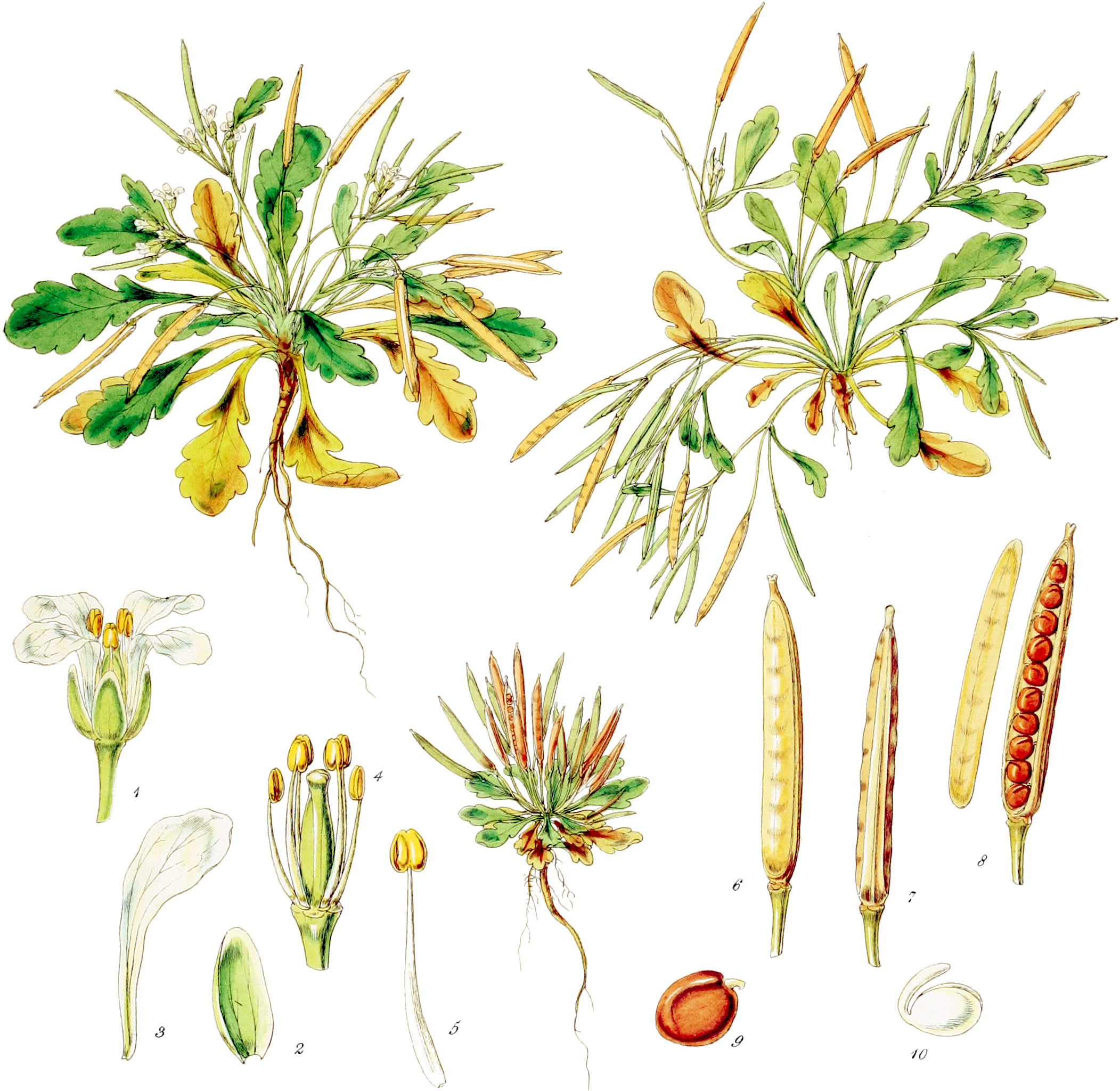
- Plate III (Hooker, 1844)

Conservation status
- Naturally Uncommon (NZ TCS)

Scientific classification
- Kingdom: Plantae
- Clade: Tracheophytes
- Clade: Angiosperms
- Clade: Eudicots
- Clade: Rosids
- Order: Brassicales
- Family: Brassicaceae
- Genus: Cardamine
- Species: C. depressa

Binomial name
- Cardamine depressa Hook.f.

= Cardamine depressa =

Species of flowering plant

Cardamine depressa, commonly known as bitter cress, is a plant in the Brassicaceae family, found in the Antipodean Islands.

== Description ==
Cardamine depressa is a perennial herb, with erect hairless stems growing up to 20 cm high. The leaves may be hairless or hary and are brownish or green, leathery or thin. The basal leaves are simple and may be crenate or entire. The petals are white and 2–3 by 0.6–1 mm. There are six stamens. The brown seeds are circular to oblong, and 0.8–1 mm in length.

It can be found flowering from October to March, and fruiting from November to March.

== Habitat ==
According to Hooker, it is found "in gravelly moist places near the sea amongst grass".

== Conservation status ==
In both 2009 and 2012 it was deemed to be "Not Threatened" under the New Zealand Threat Classification System, and this New Zealand classification was changed to "At Risk - Naturally Uncommon" in 2018, for both subspecies: Cardamine depressa subsp. depressa and Cardamine depressa subsp. stellata, together with the additional qualifiers that they are "Data Poor", "Island endemics" with both found only in one location "OL".
