= Beacon Rock (Canterbury) =

Island in New Zealand

- Interactive map of Beacon Rock

Geography
- Coordinates: 43.601681°S 172.861844°E

Administration
- New Zealand
- Region: Canterbury

Demographics
- Population: uninhabited

Beacon Rock is an island on the east coast of the Canterbury Region in New Zealand.

== See also ==
- List of islands of New Zealand
