= François Édouard Raynal =

French sailor and writer (1830–1898)

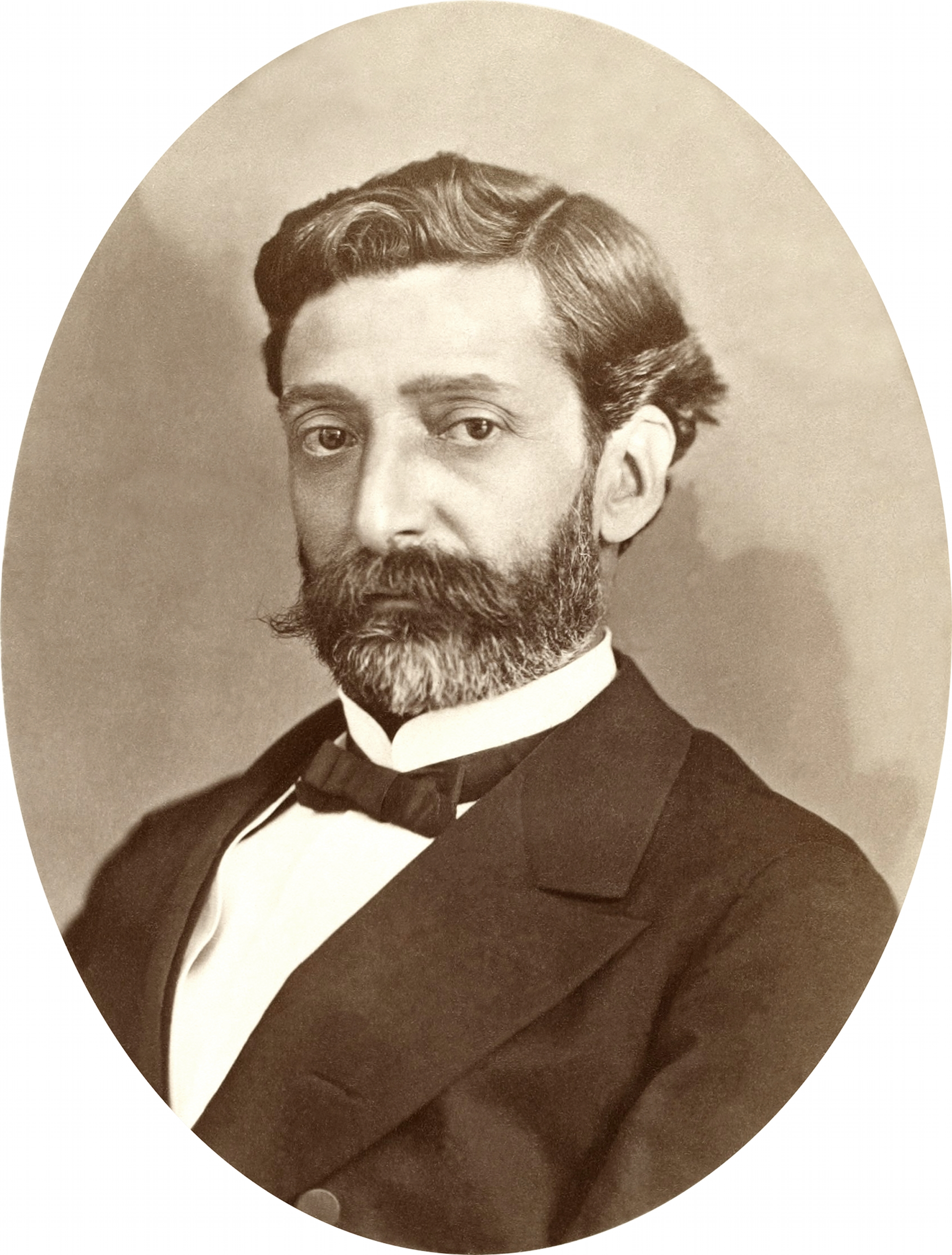
François Édouard Raynal

François Édouard Raynal (8 July 1830 – 28 April 1898) was a French sailor best known for his involvement in the Grafton shipwreck at the Auckland Islands. He wrote a popular account of the voyage, Les Naufragés, ou Vingt mois sur un récif des îles Auckland which was translated into English as Wrecked on a Reef.

The 2003 English edition of Wrecked On A Reef (1869) has additional appendices by French scholar Christiane Mortelier who presents a case for the influence of Raynal's book on Jules Verne's The Mysterious Island. Wrecked On A Reef was very popular at the time of publication, being translated into multiple languages. According to Mortelier, Verne read Raynal's account and loosely based his novel on the true life story of shipwreck, survival, privation, and ultimate rescue.
