= Dendroplectron =

Scientific classification
- Kingdom: Animalia
- Phylum: Arthropoda
- Clade: Pancrustacea
- Class: Insecta
- Order: Orthoptera
- Suborder: Ensifera
- Family: Rhaphidophoridae
- Genus: Dendroplectron; Richards, 1964
- Species: D. aucklandense

Binomial name
- Dendroplectron aucklandense Richards, 1964

Genus of orthopteran insects

Dendroplectron aucklandense the Auckland Island wētā, is a cave wētā in the family Rhaphidophoridae, the only member of the genus Dendroplectron. It is endemic to the subantarctic Auckland Islands of New Zealand.
