= Miriquidica effigurata =

Scientific classification
- Kingdom: Fungi
- Division: Ascomycota
- Class: Lecanoromycetes
- Order: Lecanorales
- Family: Lecanoraceae
- Genus: Miriquidica
- Species: M. effigurata

Binomial name
- Miriquidica effigurata Fryday & Coppins (2008)
- Type locality: Summit of Mount Dumas, Campbell Island, New Zealand

Species of lichen-forming fungus

Miriquidica effigurata is a species of rock-dwelling, crustose lichen in the family Lecanoraceae. It is found only on Campbell Island and the Auckland Islands south of New Zealand, where it grows on exposed rocks at high elevations in windswept grassland and peatland habitats. The lichen forms thick greyish crusts that crack into flat segments, and is distinguished by the presence of conspicuous black cephalodia, which are small structures containing cyanobacteria scattered between the segments. It is one of only two species in its genus known to develop these specialised nitrogen-fixing structures.

== Taxonomy ==
Miriquidica effigurata was described as a new species in 2008 by Alan Fryday and Brian Coppins. It was introduced as part of a study on cephalodia-bearing crustose lichens from the southern New Zealand outlying islands, based mainly on material collected by Henry Imshaug and collaborators in the early 1970s. The holotype was collected by Richard Harris on the summit of Mount Dumas on Campbell Island at about 500 m elevation, in wet grassland and upland peat bog. The specific epithet refers to the effigurate (having a definite form or outline), almost lobe-like shape developed by the outer areoles of the thallus, which are emphasised in the Latin diagnosis of the species.

At the time it was described, M. effigurata and Miriquidica squamulosa were the only known species of Miriquidica with cephalodia. Fryday compared M. effigurata mainly with Miriquidica complanata: both can form a thick grey thallus with marginal areoles that become somewhat squamulose, but M. effigurata differs in its dark lower hypothecium, which turns purple-red in potassium hydroxide (K), and in the presence of confluentic acid. He also noted that confluentic acid had not previously been reported from the genus, whose species more often contain miriquidic acid or various depsidones.

== Description ==
The thallus of Miriquidica effigurata a spreading crust, pale grey to brownish in colour, that may reach several centimetres across. Its surface is broken into flat or slightly convex areoles, usually around 0.8 mm wide but sometimes reaching about 1.1 mm, and the marginal areoles may become somewhat squamulose and show a dark underside. The cortex is made of vertically arranged hyphae with a pigmented upper layer, and in many specimens, an epinecral layer (a layer of dead fungal tissue) may be present on the surface, contributing to the dull grey appearance of some thalli. The main photobiont is a unicellular (chlorococcoid) green alga with cells about 10–12 micrometres (μm) in diameter.

Cephalodia are common and lie between the areoles as black patches that may appear blue-black when wet. They are usually rounded to angular and about 0.5–0.8 mm across, although they can be larger, and their surface is rough and may become somewhat subfruticose (somewhat shrub-like) in older structures. The cyanobacterial partner was tentatively identified as Scytonema; its bright blue, ellipsoid cells are arranged in short vertical chains and become larger and more heavily sheathed toward the surface of the cephalodium.

Apothecia are often absent, but when present they are lecideine in form (lacking a thalline rim) and immersed in the thallus, frequently compound and sometimes almost gyrose (with a wrinkled, brain-like disc), with a black disc that appears reddish brown when wet and a very thin, slightly raised black margin. The hymenium is 70–90 μm high and has a faintly pigmented zone that stains blue with iodine; below it are a hyaline upper hypothecium and a much darker lower layer that stains purple-red in K. Asci have a weakly developed Lecanora-type tholus (a thickened cap at the tip of the ascus) and usually contain eight simple, hyaline, broadly ellipsoid ascospores measuring about 9–12 × 5–7 μm. Immersed pale brown pycnidia are common and produce curved, filiform conidia around 20 μm long. Standard spot tests are negative, and thin-layer chromatography detects confluentic acid together with accessory substances.

== Habitat and distribution ==
Miriquidica effigurata is known only from Campbell Island and the Auckland Islands, where it grows on siliceous rock at exposed high-elevation sites. Collection data place it on mountain summits and ridges, including Mount Dumas, Mount Honey, Mont Lyall and Mount Fizeau on Campbell Island, as well as high ground on Auckland and Adams Islands. The habitats recorded for it include feldmark (sparse high-altitude vegetation), wet grassland and peatland, mostly at about 500–650 m above sea level.

In these settings it forms crusts on exposed siliceous rock and occurs with several other lichens of the southern oceanic uplands. Associated species recorded in the type series and additional collections include Micarea pannarica, Miriquidica squamulosa, Pertusaria stellata, Rimularia maculata, a Tephromela taxon close to T. atra, Megalaria obludens, and Varicellaria cacuminum. So far M. effigurata is known only from these southern shelf islands, and all records come from exposed, oceanic sites on hill and mountain tops. In the 2018 edition of the Conservation status of New Zealand indigenous lichens and lichenicolous fungi, M. effigurata is assessed as data deficient and given the qualifier RR (range restricted), used for taxa with a naturally small geographic range and no documented current decline.
