= Venus Bay (New Zealand) =

Body of water next to Campbell Island

Coordinates: 52°33′37″S 169°08′29″E

Venus Bay is located on Perseverance Harbour on New Zealand's subantarctic Campbell Island. It was named for an 1874 French astronomical expedition to view the Transit of Venus, which set up camp at the site. As a result of the expedition, many of Campbell Island's landforms have French names, including Mount Fizeau and Mount Dumas.
