= Jacquemart Island =

Island in New Zealand

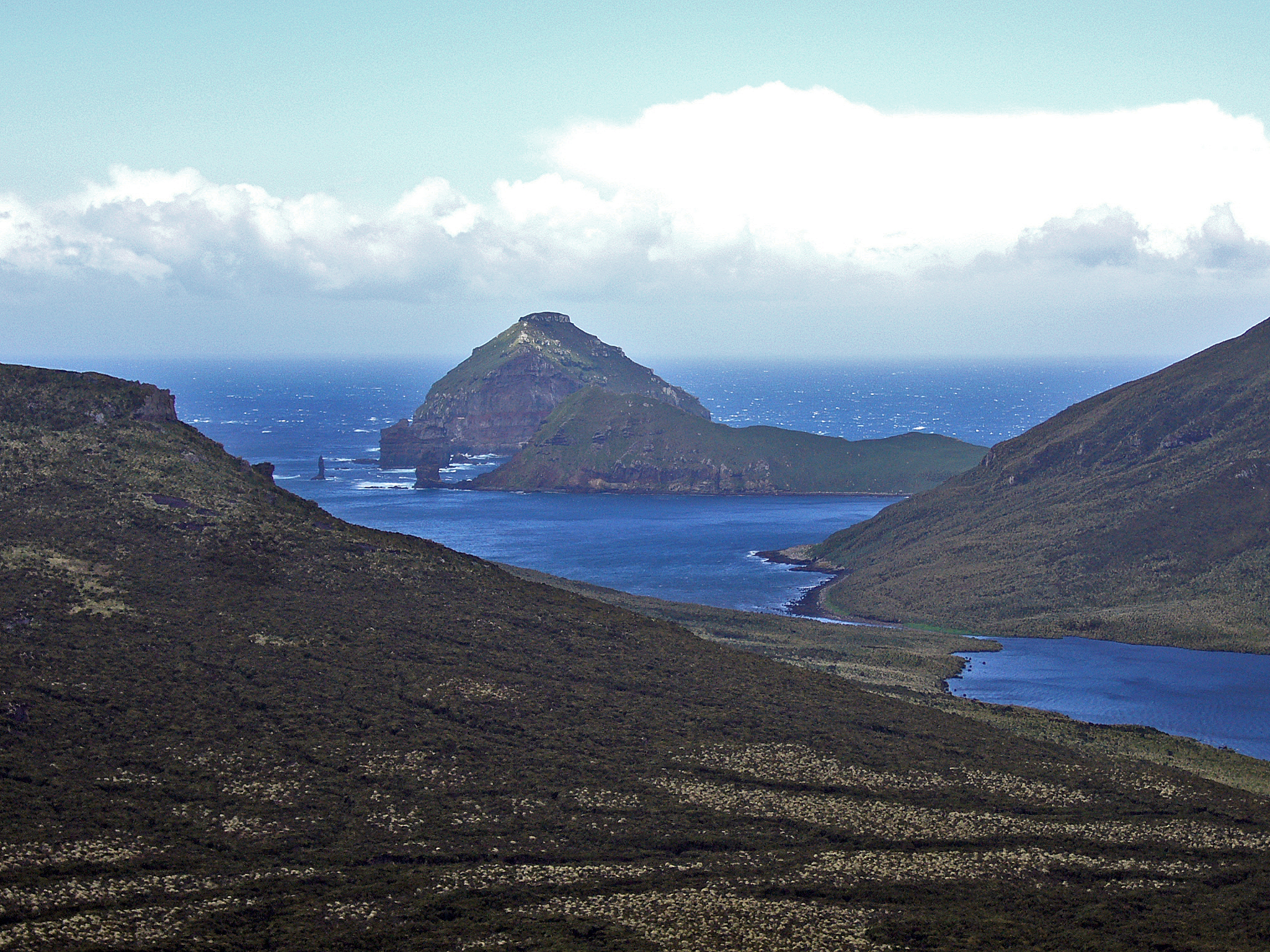
- Jacquemart Island in the distance

- Location within Oceania

Geography
- Coordinates: 52°37′10″S 169°07′33″E
- Archipelago: Campbell Island group
- Area: 19 ha (47 acres)
- Length: 0.75 km (0.466 mi)
- Width: 0.5 km (0.31 mi)
- Highest elevation: 229 m (751 ft)

Administration
- New Zealand

Demographics
- Population: Uninhabited

Jacquemart Island, one of the islets surrounding Campbell Island in New Zealand, lies 1 km (1/2 nmi) south of Campbell Island and is the southernmost island of New Zealand.

The name commemorates Captain J. Jacquemart, of the vessel FRWS Vire, that supported the French 1874 Transit of Venus Expedition to Campbell Island.

== Geography ==
Jacquemart Island consists of a stack with an area of 19 ha (47 acres), being about 750 m (2,500 ft) in length by 500 m (1,600 ft) in width and surrounded by precipitous cliffs at least 30 m (100 ft) high at their lowest. Its highest point is about 200 m (650 ft) asl. It is an eroded remnant of basaltic lavas originally laid down on a sedimentary base.

Because of its inaccessibility from the sea, the first visit by humans to the island did not take place until 29 December 1980 when a small party of scientists was landed by helicopter on the summit ridge for a 90-minute survey. Subsequent short visits were made in 1984 and 1997.

== Flora and fauna ==
Much of the area of the island above the cliffs is covered with tussock grassland on a substratum of peat undermined with petrel burrows. The environment includes herbfield communities, rock and ledge communities, as well as lichens and cushion plants.

Birds recorded as breeding on Jacquemart include the sooty shearwater, northern giant petrel, grey-backed storm-petrel, light-mantled sooty albatross, brown skua and Campbell shag. Other seabirds which may breed there are common diving-petrel and Cape petrel. New Zealand pipits and common starlings have been seen. A species of cave weta has also been recorded from the island, as well as the Campbell Island leaf-veined slug.

The island is part of the Campbell Island group Important Bird Area (IBA), identified as such by BirdLife International because of its significance as a breeding site for several species of seabirds as well as the endemic Campbell teal and Campbell snipe.

=== Campbell snipe ===
Until the Campbell Islands were cleared of introduced rats in 2001, Jacquemart was also the last refuge of the Campbell snipe, a subspecies of Subantarctic snipe first discovered in 1997 and described in 2009. After the eradication of rats, the snipe began to recolonise the rest of the group, with a small breeding population discovered in 2005 on southern Campbell Island opposite Jacquemart.

== See also ==
- Campbell Island group
- Extreme points of New Zealand
- List of islands of New Zealand
- List of Antarctic and subantarctic islands
- New Zealand subantarctic islands
- Slope Point
