= Xenolecia cataractarum =

Scientific classification
- Domain: Eukaryota
- Kingdom: Fungi
- Division: Ascomycota
- Class: Lecanoromycetes
- Order: Lecideales
- Family: Lecideaceae
- Genus: Xenolecia
- Species: X. cataractarum

Binomial name
- Xenolecia cataractarum Fryday (2017)

Species of lichen

Xenolecia cataractarum is a species of saxicolous and crustose lichen in the family Lecideaceae. It is only known to occur on Campbell Island, New Zealand.

== Taxonomy ==
The lichen was formally described as a new species in 2017 by lichenologist Alan Fryday, based on herbarium collections kept at Michigan State University. The type specimen was collected by Henry Imshaug in 1970, in Dracophyllum scrubland on the south slope of Mount Honey (Campbell Island). This area has several waterfalls; the lichen was found growing on siliceous rock. The lichen is only known to occur at the type locality, where Imshaug made several separate collections. The specific epithet cataractarum, which is Latin for "waterfall", refers to that geographical feature of the type locality.

== Description ==
The lichen has a creamy-white thallus with a margin outlined by an underlying bluish-black prothallus. It has numerous apothecia, which are sunk into the thallus surface like a black, concave disc (often surrounded by a blue-grey border) measuring 0.2–0.5 mm in diameter. The photobiont partner of this lichen is a chlorococcoid green alga with spherical to ovoid cells 5–7 μm across; these cells are loosely arranged in vertical bundles. Xenolecia cataractarum contains norstictic acid, a secondary compound that can be detected using thin-layer chromatography. The expected results of standard chemical spot tests are K+ (red), C−, KC−, and PD+ (yellow).
