= Eudonia gressitti =

Scientific classification
- Kingdom: Animalia
- Phylum: Arthropoda
- Class: Insecta
- Order: Lepidoptera
- Family: Crambidae
- Genus: Eudonia
- Species: E. gressitti

Binomial name
- Eudonia gressitti (Munroe, 1964)

Synonyms
- Witlesia gressitti Munroe, 1964

Species of moth

Eudonia gressitti is a moth in the family Crambidae. It was described by Eugene G. Munroe in 1964. This species is endemic to New Zealand, where it has been recorded from the Campbell Islands.
