= Campbell Islands =

Island group in New Zealand

Motu Ihupuku
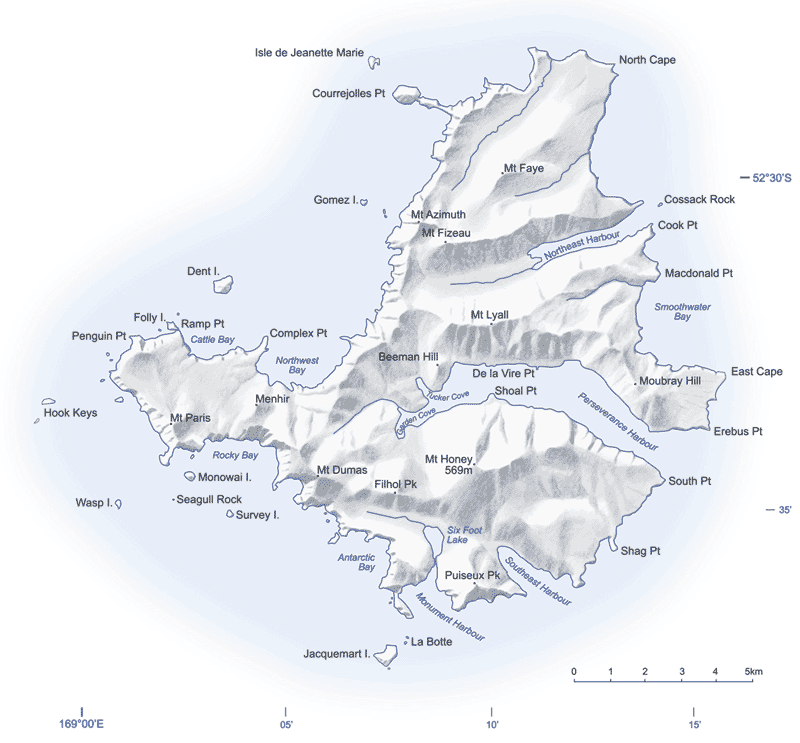
- Map of the Campbell Islands

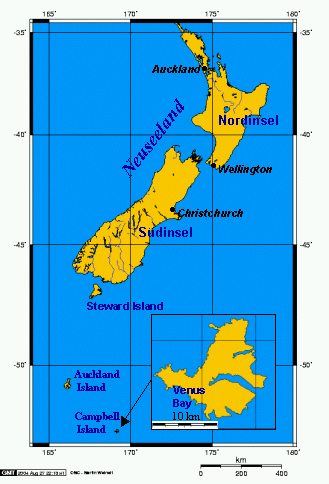
- Location relative to New Zealand and other outlying islands
- Etymology: Robert Campbell/ Island (motu) of seals (ihupuku)

Geography
- Coordinates: 52°32′S 169°09′E
- Area: 113 km^{2} (44 sq mi)
- Highest elevation: 569 m (1867 ft)
- Highest point: Mount Honey

Administration
- New Zealand

Demographics
- Population: Uninhabited

The Campbell Islands (Motu Ihupuku or Campbell Island Group) are a group of subantarctic islands, belonging to New Zealand. They lie about 600 km south of Stewart Island. The islands have a total area of 113 km^{2} (44 sq mi), consisting of one big island, Campbell Island, and several small islets, notably Dent Island, Isle de Jeanette Marie, Folly Island (or Folly Islands), Jacquemart Island, and Monowai Island (also known as Lion Rock). Ecologically, they are part of the Antipodes Subantarctic Islands tundra ecoregion. The islands were gazetted as a nature reserve in 1954, and are one of five subantarctic island groups collectively designated as a World Heritage Site by UNESCO.

== History ==
Unlike the Auckland Islands to the north, no archaeological evidence has been found of pre-European settlement in the Campbell Islands. The island's remoteness, small land area, lack of tree cover and severe climate mitigated against this. The islands have been subjected to archaeological investigations on several occasions to try and find evidence of such visits.

The archipelago was discovered in 1810 by Captain Frederick Hasselborough of the sealing brig Perseverance, which was owned by Robert Campbell's Sydney-based company Campbell & Co. (whence the island's name). Captain Hasselborough drowned on 4 November 1810 in Perseverance Harbour on the south of the main island, along with a young woman and a boy.

They subsequently became a minor sealing station. In fact, the islands' name in Te Reo Māori is "Motu Ihupuku" meaning "islands of seals".

The 1874 Transit of Venus Expedition visited the islands, and as well as tending to astronomical matters mapped and named many parts of the archipelago.

In the twentieth century, the islands were briefly home to a small farm, and the Cape Expedition during WW2.

In more recent times, the islands have become a conservation area. In 1992, they were the location of the world's most southerly known shark attack on a human and the victim had to be airlifted 2,000 km away to hospital in Christchurch.

== Geography ==
The islands are relatively flat; due to tectonic pressure, however, there are mountains in the centre of each island. A sea stack at the southern tip of Jacquemart Island is – with the exception of the country's Antarctic claims – New Zealand's southernmost point.

The following table includes named islands according to Land Information New Zealand.

Location	Area (ha)
Campbell Island	10,906.0
Jacquemart Island	24.7
Dent Island	20.5
Isle de Jeanette Marie	8.4
Monowai Island	6.7
Hook Keys	6.3
Wasp Island	4.5
Survey Island	3.3
Gomez Island	2.1
Cossack Rock	0.9
Seagull Rock	0.1
Bull Rock	0.1
Folly Island	unknown
Total	10,983.7

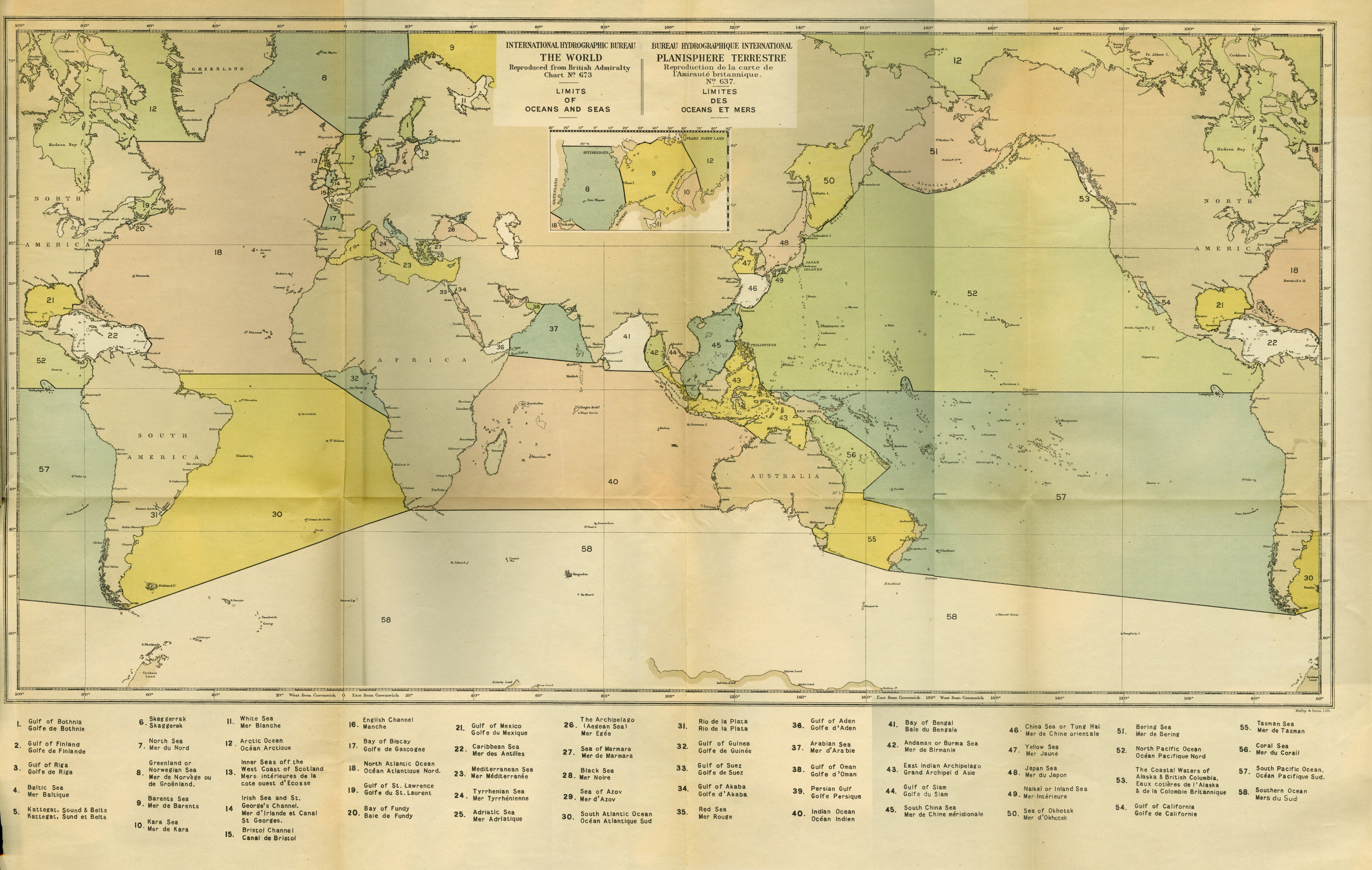
1928 delineation of Southern Ocean including Campbell Islands

Currently, the Campbell Islands are considered to be located in the South Pacific. Historically, however, the islands were considered to be in the Southern Ocean, whose boundaries have been redefined on numerous occasions in recent years.

== Flora and fauna ==
Since its discovery in 1810, the flora and fauna have been under threat from mammals introduced by humans. Cats (Felis catus) and Norway rats (Rattus novegicus) prey on native birds, and much of the vegetation was destroyed by sheep (Ovis aries) and cattle (Bos taurus). Restoration of the island began in 1970 with the removal of the feral cattle and sheep; subsequently the island's vegetation recovered, becoming denser. In 2001, four helicopters, under instruction from the New Zealand Department of Conservation (DOC) spread 120 tonnes of rodenticide-laced bait across the island over one month. Repeated monitoring has found no signs of rats since. This operation became a template for rat eradication on other islands around the world.

=== Important Bird Area ===
The Campbell Islands have been identified as an Important Bird Area (IBA) by BirdLife International because of its significance as a breeding site for several species of seabirds, as well as the endemic Campbell teal and Campbell snipe. The seabirds are southern rockhopper and yellow-eyed penguins, Antipodean, southern royal, light-mantled, black-browed, Campbell and grey-headed albatrosses, northern giant and white-chinned petrels, and the Campbell shag.

== See also ==
- Desert island
- List of Antarctic and subantarctic islands
- List of islands
- List of islands of New Zealand
- New Zealand Subantarctic Islands
