= Dent Island (New Zealand) =

Subantarctic South Pacific rock

Dent Island, New Zealand
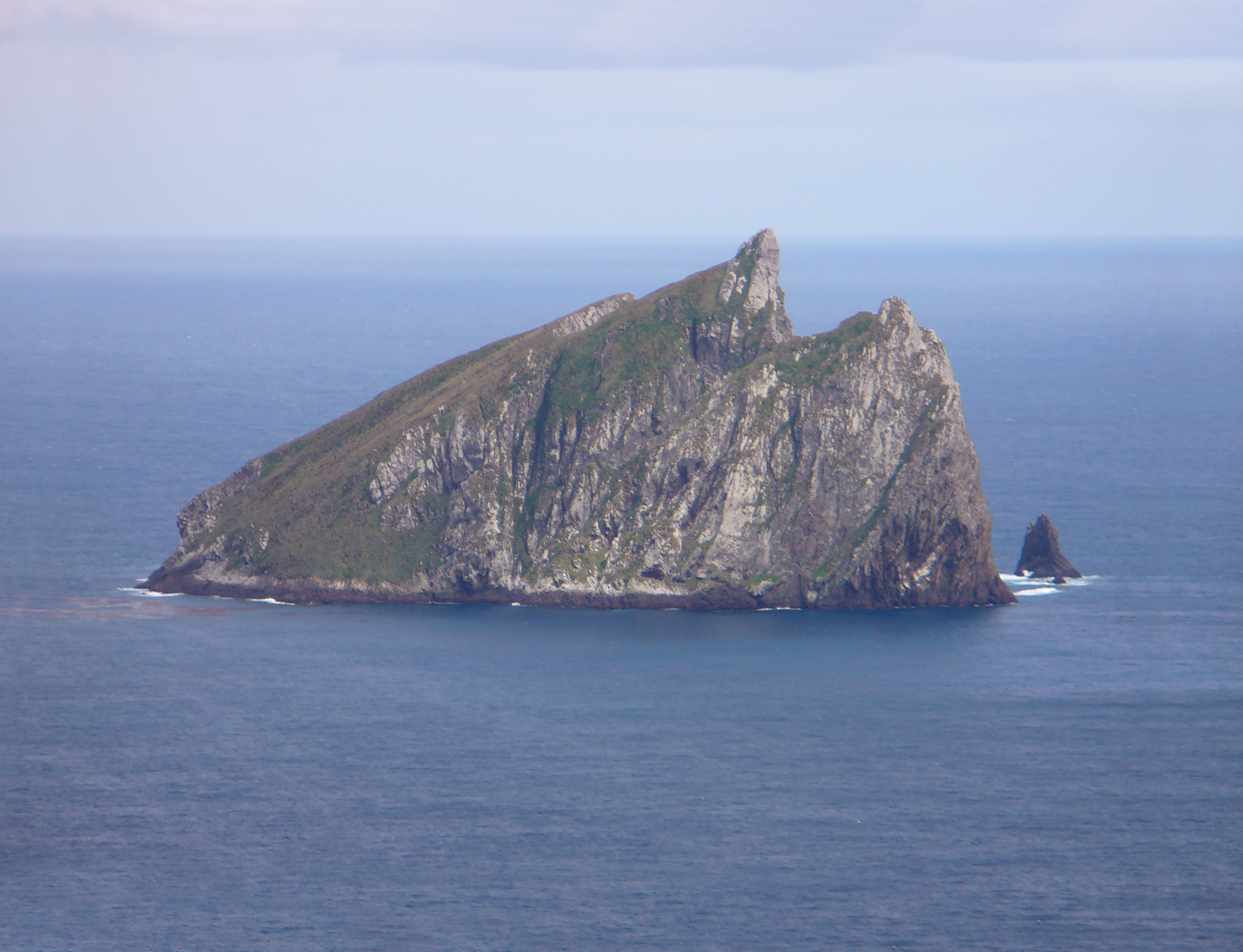
- Dent Island, New Zealand
- Interactive map of Dent Island, New Zealand

Geography
- Coordinates: 52°31.15′S 169°3.75′E
- Archipelago: Campbell Island group
- Area: 26 ha (64 acres)
- Highest elevation: 114 m (374 ft)

Administration
- New Zealand

Demographics
- Population: Uninhabited

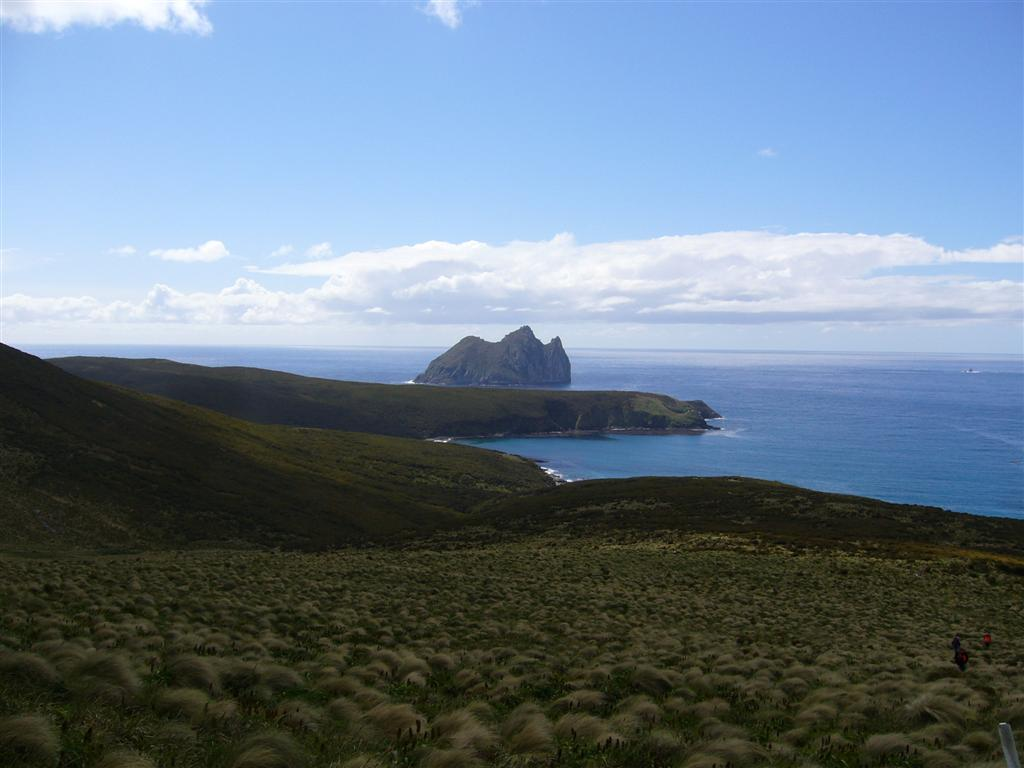
Dent Island: In the distance

Dent Island is a subantarctic 26-hectare (64-acre) rock stack, lying 3 km (1.9 mi) west of Campbell Island and belonging to the Campbell Island group. Dent Island is located at 52°31.15′S 169°3.75′E and rises to a maximum elevation of 114 metres (374 ft). The island was named by the French 1874 Transit of Venus Expedition to Campbell Island because of its resemblance to a tooth (dent in French).

The island is part of the Campbell Island group Important Bird Area (IBA), identified as such by BirdLife International because of its significance as a breeding site for several species of seabirds as well as the endemic Campbell teal and Campbell snipe. Dent Island, along with the rest of the Campbell Island group, forms part of the New Zealand Subantarctic Islands, a UNESCO World Heritage Site designated in 1998 in recognition of its outstanding natural value and significant biodiversity.

== Geography and geology ==
Dent Island lies on the Campbell Plateau, a submerged portion of the New Zealand continental landmass, and is the highly eroded remnant of an ancient shield volcano that was active from the Miocene to Pleistocene epochs. The island's rugged terrain consists primarily of steep cliffs and limited vegetation, adapted to the subantarctic environment with tussock grasslands and megaherbs dominating any flat areas. The island's topography includes steep cliffs that rise sharply from the surrounding sea, contributing to its isolation and exposure to relentless westerly winds. Limited soil accumulation occurs primarily in sheltered pockets, as the predominant rock exposures and high-energy conditions inhibit significant pedogenesis.

== History ==
Dent Island was named during the French Transit of Venus Expedition of 1874, which established an observation station on Campbell Island to record the rare astronomical event of Venus transiting the Sun on 9 December 1874. The expedition conducted surveys and mapped surrounding features, leading to the naming of the islet as Île de la Dent, with "Dent" being the French word for "tooth", due to its prominent, jagged rock stack that resembles a tooth rising from the sea.

Human exploration of Dent Island has been limited by its remote location, with activities primarily centered on scientific expeditions following its initial sighting. The island's first documented post-discovery human visit occurred in 1975 during the Campbell Island Expedition 1975-76, when a team led by expedition leader Rodney Russ rediscovered a remnant population of the presumed-extinct Campbell Island teal (Anas nesiotis) on the rat-free islet. The expedition involved landing on the steep, 26-hectare volcanic plug amid challenging seas, with activities limited to surveys and observations to avoid disturbing the fragile habitat.

== Ecology ==
=== Flora ===
The flora on Dent Island features almost continuous vegetative cover adapted to the harsh, exposed environment, dominated by tussock grasses such as Poa litorosa on ridge crests, alongside Poa foliosa, megaherbs like Stilbocarpa polaris and Bulbinella rossii in gullies and recolonized slip scars, and lichens and low-growing herbs in nutrient-poor, windswept soils. No forests or tall shrubs occur due to the islet's diminutive size, elevation constraints, and extreme weather, resulting in a landscape of tussock grasslands, megaherb patches, and bare rock. Plant diversity is notably low compared to mainland New Zealand, mirroring the limited vascular flora that characterizes this remote archipelago.

=== Fauna ===
Dent Island is a predator-free haven, having never been colonized by introduced rats (Rattus norvegicus) or cats (Felis catus) that devastated the main Campbell Island's native wildlife. The island forms part of the Campbell Islands group, designated as an Important Bird Area (IBA) by BirdLife International due to its role in supporting significant populations of breeding seabirds, including several globally threatened species. Seabird breeding on Dent Island centers on burrowing species, with extensive colonies of white-chinned petrels (Procellaria aequinoctialis) utilizing the island's soil for nesting burrows, a refuge from predation pressures on the nearby main Campbell Island.

The island is a key refuge for the critically endangered Campbell Island teal (Anas nesiotis), a flightless duck endemic to the region. Translocation efforts by the Department of Conservation have supported recovery, with the total population across the Campbell group estimated at 400–600 as of 2015. Among terrestrial endemics, the Campbell snipe (Coenocorypha aucklandica subspecies), a ground-dwelling bird adapted to the island's rugged, rocky terrain and tussock grasslands, persists as one of the rarest avian survivors in the region.

=== Campbell teal ===
The island is most famous for its Campbell teal, which was thought to have been extinct for more than 100 years until a small group was rediscovered there in 1975 by a Wildlife Service expedition led by Rodney Russ. Dent Island is free from predators, especially the rats whose introduction on Campbell Island led to the extinction of the teal there. At the time of rediscovery, the population was estimated at fewer than 50 individuals. However, the suitable habitat for the teal on Dent Island is much more limited than its 26-hectare (64-acre) area would suggest, because a large area of the island is bare rock.

The Campbell teal conservation programme started in 1984 when four birds (one female and three males) were transferred from Dent Island to the Pukaha / Mount Bruce National Wildlife Centre. In 1990, an additional seven birds (three females and four males) were captured from Dent Island for translocation and captive breeding, bringing the total removed to 11 individuals to support recovery efforts. In 1997, a census carried out on Dent Island showed that its Campbell teal population had declined to dangerous levels with only three birds being found.

However, the conservation and breeding has been very successful, and in recent years many teals have been reintroduced onto Campbell Island itself, where there is now a population of over a hundred. Rats were eventually eradicated from Campbell Island in 2001, and the island's rat-free status was confirmed in 2006. Between 2004 and 2006, 159 captive-raised teal were released directly onto Campbell Island, with monitoring confirming high survival rates and rapid adaptation. The species, now classified as Vulnerable by the IUCN, has seen its wild population grow to over 400 individuals (as of 2012), underscoring the islet's ecological importance in species recovery.

== Conservation ==
Dent Island is managed by the Department of Conservation as part of a National Nature Reserve under the Reserves Act 1977, ensuring the highest level of terrestrial protection with strict prohibitions on activities that could introduce invasives or disturb habitats. Legal frameworks, including the Conservation Act 1987 and a dedicated Conservation Management Strategy, enforce rigorous biosecurity protocols, such as vessel inspections and gear cleaning for all visitors, while limiting access to permitted research or guided tours only. The uninhabited status of Dent Island preserves its predator-free environment, supported indirectly by the successful 2001 rat eradication on adjacent Campbell Island, which reduced the likelihood of reinvasion across the group. Marine protections extend to surrounding waters via the Campbell Island/Motu Ihupuku Marine Reserve, prohibiting fishing and enhancing safeguards against external threats.

== See also ==
- List of Antarctic and subantarctic islands
- New Zealand subantarctic islands
- Megaherb
