= Xenolecia =

Scientific classification
- Domain: Eukaryota
- Kingdom: Fungi
- Division: Ascomycota
- Class: Lecanoromycetes
- Order: Lecideales
- Family: Lecideaceae
- Genus: Xenolecia; Hertel (1984)

Type species
- Xenolecia spadicomma (Nyl.) Hertel (1984)

Species
- X. cataractarum X. spadicomma

Genus of lichens

Xenolecia is a genus of saxicolous (rock-dwelling) and crustose lichens in the family Lecideaceae. It has two species: X. cataractarum, and the type species, X. spadicomma. The genus was circumscribed by German lichenologist Hannes Hertel in 1987 to contain the type, a lichen known at that time only from the type locality on Wellington Island, Chile. Its range has since been expanded to include the Falkland Islands and northern Patagonia. X. cataractarum, found in Campbell Island, New Zealand was added to the genus in 2017.
