= Campbell Island cattle =

Breed of cattle

A photo of multiple members of the breed

Campbell Island cattle were a feral breed of domestic cattle (Bos taurus) found on Campbell Island, New Zealand. From photographs taken in 1976 it appeared that the cattle were at least partly of shorthorn origin. This breed is now extinct.

== History ==
Cattle were introduced to Campbell Island in 1902, along with sheep and other livestock, as part of an ill-fated attempt to establish farming there. It was reported that, by 1910, there were ten cows and six bulls present, which were allowed to run wild. In 1931 the farming attempt had failed and the cattle were abandoned. A small herd of about 20 animals persisted until the 1970s, after which a programme of eradicating introduced livestock was implemented, with the cattle being exterminated by about 1984.

== See also ==
- Enderby Island cattle
- Campbell Island sheep
