= Venus Bay =

Venus Bay may refer to:

- Venus Bay, South Australia, Australia
- Venus Bay, Victoria, Australia
- Venus Bay (New Zealand)
