= Folly Island, New Zealand =

Subantarctic South Pacific island

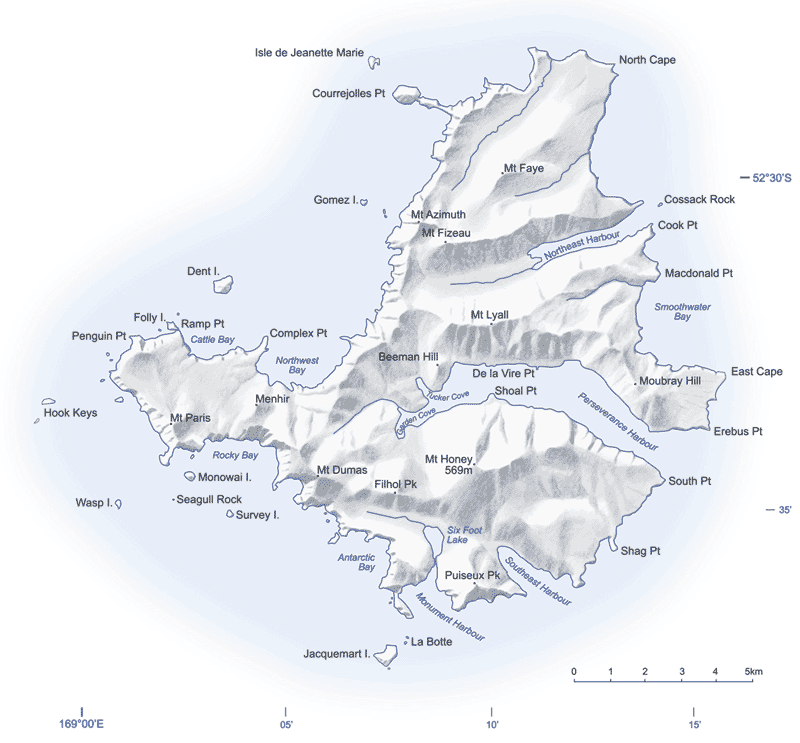

Geography
- Coordinates: 52°31′48″S 169°02′36″E
- Archipelago: Campbell Island group

Administration
- New Zealand

Demographics
- Population: Uninhabited

Folly Island or the Folly Islands is a subantarctic island located in New Zealand's Campbell Island group.

== Environment ==
In a survey of the island in 1976, it was found to have rats and "possibly the only pristine stand of Chionochloa antarctica" (a tussock grass) in the area, according to naturalists. Arthropod surveys were also made and none reported other than a Wētā. Rats were eradicated from the Campbell Island group in 2001. The area is among five subantarctic island groups designated as a World Heritage Site by UNESCO.

=== Important Bird Area ===
The island is part of the Campbell Island group Important Bird Area (IBA), identified as such by BirdLife International because of its significance as a breeding site for several species of seabirds as well as the endemic Campbell teal and Campbell snipe.

== See also ==
- List of Antarctic and subantarctic islands
- List of islands of New Zealand
- New Zealand subantarctic islands
