= Mount Dumas =

Mountain in New Zealand

Coordinates: 52.57113°S 169.09845°E

Mount Dumas is a mountain on Campbell Island, the main island of the Campbell Island group of subantarctic islands, belonging to New Zealand. Campbell Island is an ancient volcano, with steep coastal cliffs that expose some of the lava flows. Mount Dumas is located at the island's southern end.
