= New Zealand Subantarctic Islands =

Southernmost parts of the South Pacific country

UNESCO World Heritage Site
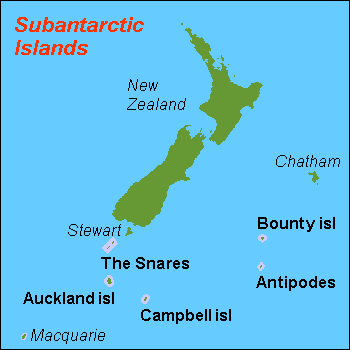
- Interactive map of New Zealand Subantarctic Islands
- Location: New Zealand
- Includes: Antipodes Islands; Auckland Islands; Bounty Islands; Campbell Islands; Snares Islands / Tini Heke
- Criteria: Natural: (ix), (x)
- Reference: 877
- Inscription: 1998 (22nd Session)
- Area: 764.8 km^{2} (295.3 sq mi)
- Coordinates: 50°45′S 166°6′E

The New Zealand Subantarctic Islands comprise the five southernmost groups of the New Zealand outlying islands. They are collectively designated as a UNESCO World Heritage Site.

Most of the islands lie near the southeast edge of the largely submerged continent centred on New Zealand called Zealandia, which was riven from Australia 60–85 million years ago, and from Antarctica 85–130 million years ago. They share some features with Australia's Macquarie Island to the west.

== History ==
Map showing the Auckland Islands in relation to other areas of Austronesian and Polynesian expansion.

These islands were uninhabited at the time of European discovery, nonetheless, there is evidence of Māori and/or Polynesian visits to some of the island groups, and some were still known to Māori at the time of European contact.

- Antipodes Islands (Moutere Mahue)– Claims of a pottery shard found here in 1886, although this is contested.
- Auckland Islands (Motu Maha/Maungahuka) – Traces of Polynesian settlement, possibly dating to the 13th century, have been found by archaeologists on Enderby Island. This is the most southerly settlement by Polynesians yet known.
- Snares Islands (Tini Heke) – The islands were already known to the Māori, who called one of the larger islands Te Taniwha ("The sea-monster"). They are visible from near Stewart Island in good conditions. A stone adze of early Maori design has been found on the islands.

European exploration took place in the 19th century, often involving exploiting the natural resources of the area for sealing and whaling etc. Some shipwrecks took place in the region, with crews being forced to live off the land. Hardwicke on Auckland Island represents one of the few serious attempts by Europeans to set up a settlement in the islands, subsequently abandoned.

Until 1995, scientific research staff were stationed permanently at a meteorological station on Campbell Island. Since then, the islands have been uninhabited, though they are periodically visited by researchers and tourists. Protection of reserves was strengthened in 2014, becoming the largest natural sanctuary in the nation.

== Islands ==
Antipodes Islands
Antipodes Island, Bollons Island, the Windward Islands, Orde Lees Island, Leeward Island, South Islet
Auckland Islands
Auckland Island, Adams Island, Disappointment Island, Enderby Island, Ewing Island, Rose Island
Bounty Islands (Moutere Hauriri)
Main Group, Centre Group, and Eastern Group islets
Campbell Islands
Campbell Island / Motu Ihupuku, Dent Island, Folly Island, Jacquemart Island
Snares Islands / Tini Heke
Alert Stack, Broughton Island, High Island, North East Island, Western Chain islets

=== Territorial claims ===
New Zealand also has territorial claims, held in abeyance under the Antarctic Treaty System, over several islands close to the Antarctic mainland, including:

- Ross Island and the rest of the Ross Archipelago
- Balleny Islands: Young Island, Buckle Island, Sturge Island, plus several smaller islets
- Roosevelt Island
- Scott Island and Haggits Pillar

Of these, Ross Island is inhabited by the scientific staff of several research stations, notably at McMurdo Sound and Scott Base.

== Ecology ==
The Antipodes, Auckland, Bounty and Campbell Islands are collectively designated the Antipodean Islands in the World Geographical Scheme for Recording Plant Distributions. The Snares Islands / Tini Heke are included with the South Island in New Zealand South under the scheme.

== See also ==
- List of Antarctic and subantarctic islands
- List of islands of New Zealand
  - New Zealand outlying islands
  - Solander Islands
  - Stewart Island
- Macquarie Island, an Australian administered island which neighbours these islands.
