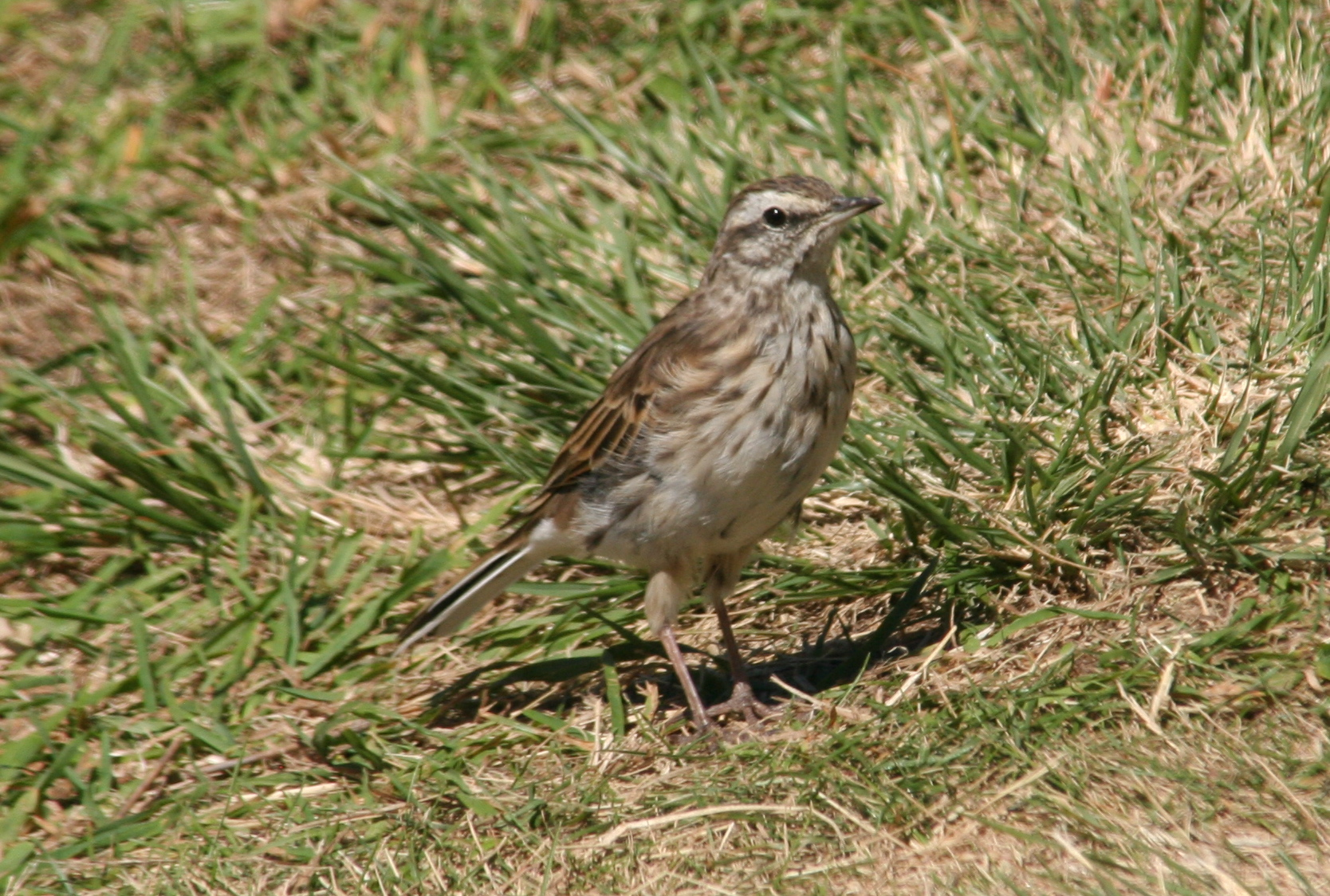
- On Kapiti Island

Conservation status
- Least Concern (IUCN 3.1)

Scientific classification
- Kingdom: Animalia
- Phylum: Chordata
- Class: Aves
- Order: Passeriformes
- Family: Motacillidae
- Genus: Anthus
- Species: A. novaeseelandiae

Binomial name
- Anthus novaeseelandiae (Gmelin, JF, 1789)

= New Zealand pipit =

Species of bird

The New Zealand pipit (Anthus novaeseelandiae) is a fairly small passerine bird of open country in New Zealand and outlying islands. It belongs to the pipit genus Anthus in the family Motacillidae.

It was formerly lumped together with the Richard's, African, Mountain and Paddyfield pipits in a single species: Richard's pipit, Anthus novaeseelandiae. Many authors split the Australasian pipit further into two species: Australian pipit (Anthus australis) in Australia and New Guinea and New Zealand pipit (Anthus novaeseelandiae), also called pīhoihoi, in New Zealand.

== Taxonomy ==
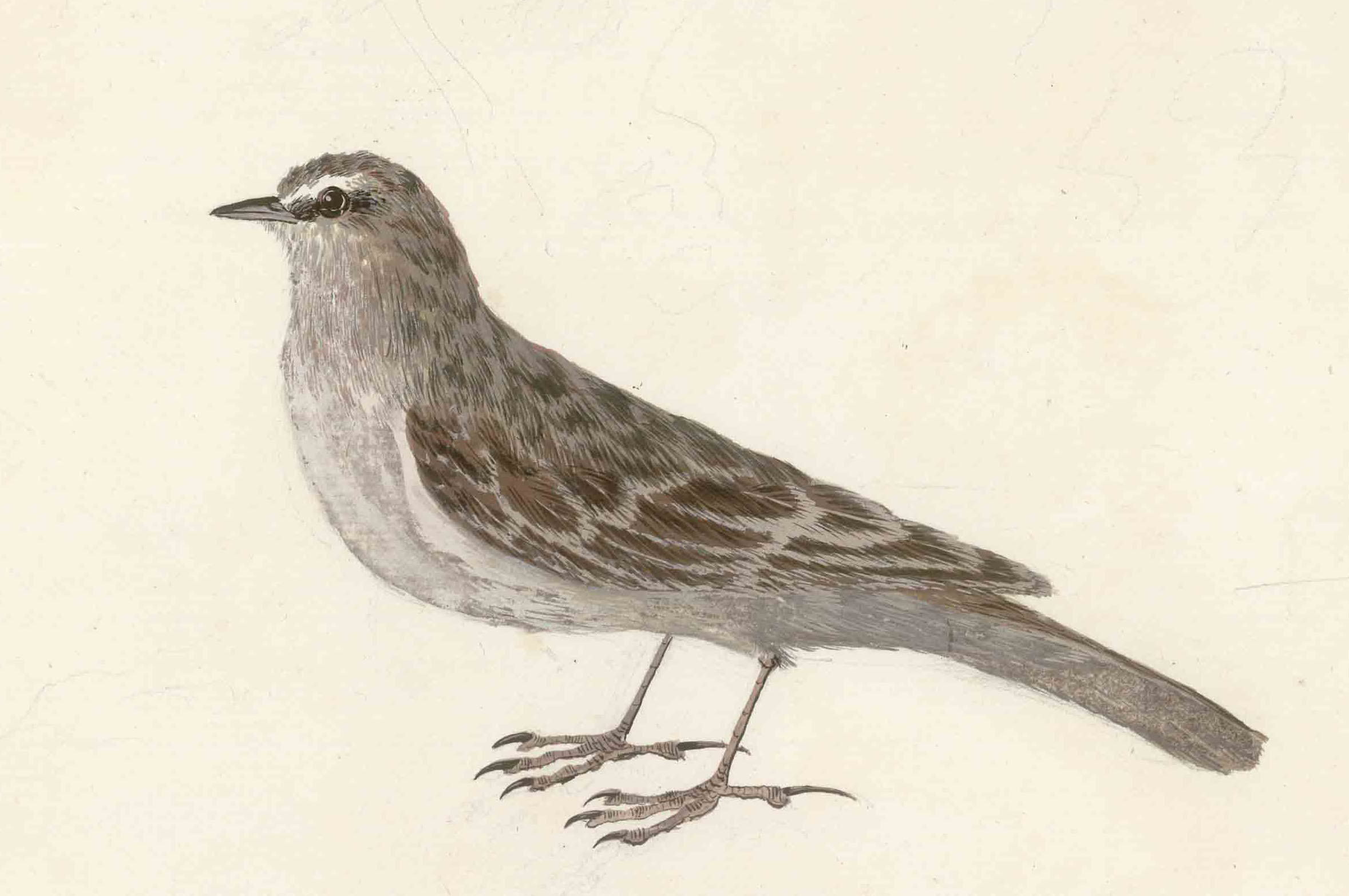
Watercolour by Georg Forster made on James Cook's second voyage to the Pacific Ocean. This painting is the holotype for the species.

The New Zealand pipit was formally described in 1789 by the German naturalist Johann Friedrich Gmelin in his revised and expanded edition of Carl Linnaeus's Systema Naturae. He placed it with the larks in the genus Alauda and coined the binomial name Alauda novaeseelandiae. Gmelin based his account on the "New Zealand lark" that had been described and illustrated in 1783 by the English ornithologist John Latham in his multi-volume work A General Synopsis of Birds. The naturalist Joseph Banks had provided Latham with a painting of the bird by Georg Forster who had accompanied James Cook on his second voyage to the Pacific Ocean. Forster's picture was drawn from a specimen collected at Queen Charlotte Sound, a fiord on the northwest corner of New Zealand's South Island. The picture is the holotype for the species and is now held by the Natural History Museum in London. The New Zealand pipit is now one of more than 40 pipits placed in the genus Anthus that was introduced in 1805 by the German naturalist Johann Matthäus Bechstein.

Four subspecies are recognised:

- A. n. novaeseelandiae (Gmelin, JF, 1789) – North, South and Stewart Island and satellites (New Zealand)
- A. n. chathamensis Lorenz von Liburnau, L, 1902 – Chatham Islands (east of South Island, New Zealand)
- A. n. aucklandicus Gray, GR, 1862 – Auckland and Campbell Islands (south of South Island, New Zealand)
- A. n. steindachneri Reischek, 1889 – Antipodes Islands (southeast of Stewart Island, New Zealand)

== Description ==
It is a slender bird, 16 to 19 cm long, and weighs about 40 grams. The plumage is pale brown above with dark streaks. The underparts are pale with streaks on the breast. There is a pale stripe over the eye and dark malar and moustachial stripes. The long tail has white outer-feathers and is often wagged up and down. The legs are long and pinkish-brown while the bill is slender and brownish.

== Ecology ==
It is a bird of open habitats such as grassland, farmland, roadsides, dry river beds, sand dunes and open woodland. It forages on the ground for small invertebrates such as beetles, spiders and insect larvae. It will also eat seeds such as those of grasses.

The birds' numbers have declined in parts of New Zealand due to the improvement of pastures, use of pesticides and predation by introduced species.

== Gallery ==
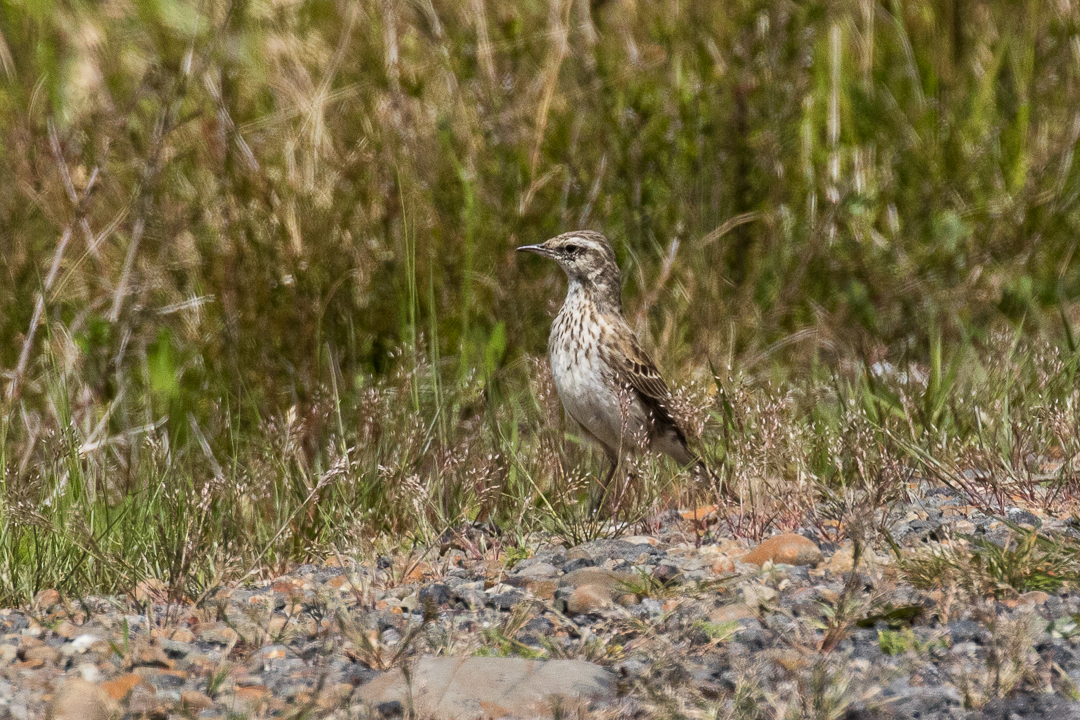
New Zealand pipit on the North Island

New Zealand pipit on Stewart Island

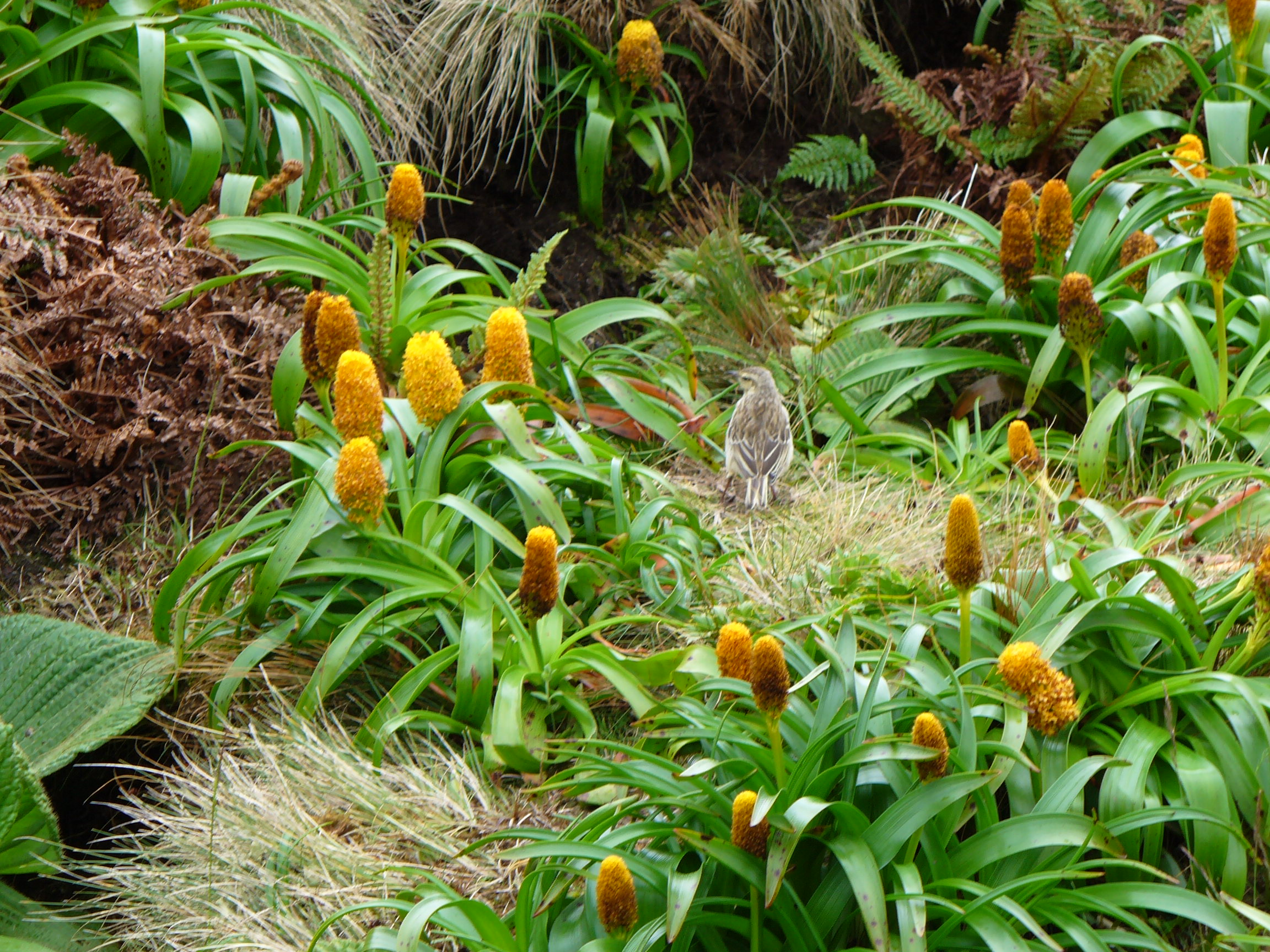
A New Zealand pipit A. n. aucklandicus and megaherbs on Campbell Island

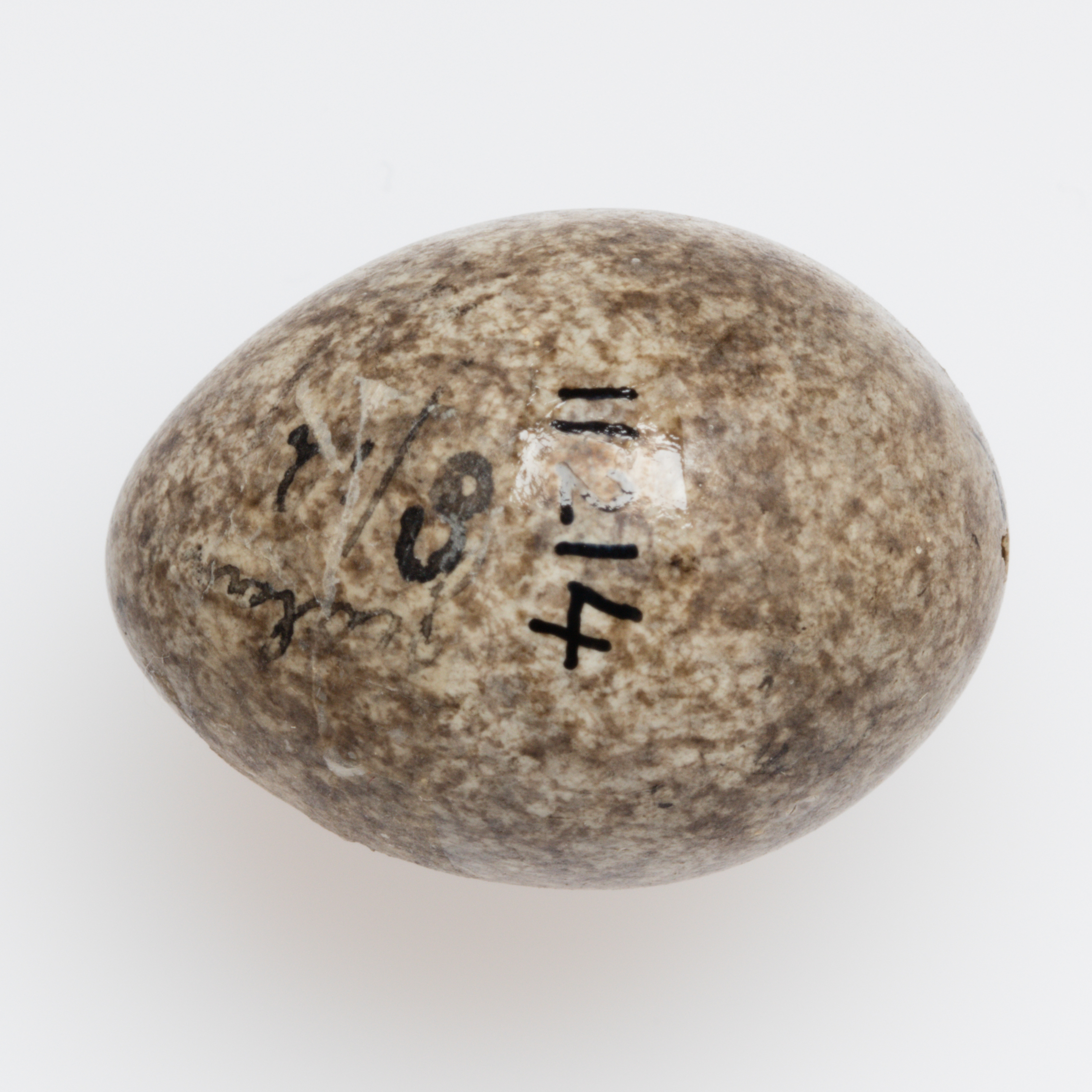
Anthus novaeseelandiae egg in the collection of Auckland Museum
