= Pertusaria stellata =

Scientific classification
- Kingdom: Fungi
- Division: Ascomycota
- Class: Lecanoromycetes
- Order: Pertusariales
- Family: Pertusariaceae
- Genus: Pertusaria
- Species: P. stellata

Binomial name
- Pertusaria stellata Fryday (2008)
- Holotype: Summit of Mount Raynal, Auckland Island

Species of lichen-forming fungus

Pertusaria stellata is a species of saxicolous (rock-dwelling) crustose lichen in the family Pertusariaceae. Described in 2008 from specimens collected on Auckland Island and in southern Chile, this species is distinguished by its creamy white to pale grey crust and distinctive blood-red, star-shaped structures (cephalodia) embedded in its surface. It is closely related to Pertusaria macloviana but differs in having larger spore-producing structures, longer spores, and the presence of these characteristic red cephalodia. The species is known only from subantarctic islands south of New Zealand and a locality in southern Chile, where it grows on siliceous rocks in cool, oceanic conditions.

== Taxonomy ==
Pertusaria stellata was described as a new species in 2008 by Alan Fryday, based on material collected by Henry Imshaug and co-workers from the southern New Zealand outlying islands and southern Chile. The holotype was gathered on siliceous rock near the summit of Mount Raynal on Auckland Island at about 645 m elevation; an isotype (duplicate) is deposited in the Allan Herbarium (CHR). In the original species description, Fryday compared the new species directly with Pertusaria macloviana, noting that it has larger spore-producing sacs (asci) and longer ascospores, together with a smoother thallus that lacks the small bump-like structures (papillate isidia) typical of that species. The Latin diagnosis also emphasises the presence of blood-red, star-shaped cephalodia within the thallus, which are reflected in the epithet stellata ('starred').

Before it was formally described, Imshaug had annotated these collections as Pertusaria obvelata, a name that has since been lectotypified for a different taxon, a saxicolous (rock-dwelling) form of P. velata. As a result, some herbarium material is likely to have been distributed under a misapplied name. Fryday also showed that records from the Auckland Islands and from Desolación Island in southern Chile that had been published as P. macloviana in earlier works actually refer, at least in part, to P. stellata; the Auckland Islands report, in particular, means that P. macloviana has not been reliably recorded from Australasia, although it does occur on Desolación Island.

Within Pertusaria, P. stellata is closely allied to P. macloviana and the Tasmanian species P. parathalassica, but it is set apart by its red, star-shaped (stellate) cephalodia, pruinose apothecia, and somewhat smaller ascospores. The species also attracted attention because it provided the first documented example of cephalodia within the genus Pertusaria. The presence of cephalodia in this species was later discussed in a broader study of cephalodiate lichens from humid, nutrient-poor, oceanic habitats, where P. stellata was treated as an example of a single cephalodiate species within an otherwise non-cephalodiate genus and used to argue that cephalodia are unreliable as a genus-level character in such environments.

== Description ==
Pertusaria stellata forms an effuse, wide-spreading crust that is creamy white to pale grey and up to about 0.3–0.5 mm thick. The thallus is cracked into flat to uneven areoles approximately 0.5–1.0 mm across, and it lacks both soredia and isidia, giving the surface a relatively smooth, even appearance compared with related species such as P. macloviana. The main photobiont is a green alga whose cells occur in irregular patches forming a discontinuous layer; the cells are either roughly spherical (globose, about 8–10 micrometres (μm) in diameter, or oblong, measuring about 15 × 10 μm.

A secondary photobiont is frequent and often abundant, forming the most striking feature of the species: dark red-brown, linear to radiating star-shaped groups embedded in the upper part of the thallus. These cephalodia are typically around 0.3–0.7 mm across (occasionally up to about 1.4 mm), with individual linear colonies 0.2–0.4 mm long and 0.05–0.1 mm wide that are immersed in the thallus surface. The cyanobacterium involved is tentatively assigned to Gloeocapsa; its cells are mostly solitary (occasionally in pairs within a common sheath), irregularly globose, 12–15 (sometimes up to 20) μm in diameter, appearing red at the thallus surface (turning K+ purple) and pale blue within the thallus (turning K+ pale blue-green).

Fruiting bodies (apothecia) are only occasional and are scattered across the thallus. They are immersed in slightly raised, wart-like thalline swellings, each wart usually containing one to three (or more) disc-shaped apothecia that together are 0.8–1.4 mm in diameter, with a distinctly pruinose surface. Individual discs range from 0.25 to 0.5 mm across when solitary. The hymenium is 300–350 μm high and does not show an iodine reaction (I−). Thread-like sterile filaments in the fertile layer (paraphyses) are slender (1–1.5 μm wide), mostly unbranched but branching and fusing together near the top, where they end in a merged, yellowish-brown, granular upper surface. The tissue layer beneath the hymenium (the hypothecium) is hyaline and composed of loosely arranged, branched and interconnecting hyphae.

Asci are of the Pertusaria type, broadly cylindrical to club-shaped (clavate), about 200–250 × 60–80 μm, and usually contain a single spore. The ascospores are large, with lengths ranging from about 127 to 247 μm and widths from roughly 36 to 105 μm; most fall around 160–230 μm long and 49–70 μm wide. No conidiomata were observed in the material examined. In standard chemical spot tests the thallus is K−, C− and Pd+ (orange-red), and high-performance liquid chromatography shows protocetraric acid as the main secondary metabolite, with fumarprotocetraric acid, confumarprotocetraric acid and virensic acid in trace amounts.

== Habitat and distribution ==
Pertusaria stellata is known from a disjunct southern-hemisphere range that includes the subantarctic islands south of New Zealand and a locality in southern Chile. It has been recorded only from the Auckland Islands and Campbell Island, which lie on the southern New Zealand shelf (Campbell Plateau), and from Desolación Island in the Magallanes Region of Chile. Across this range it occurs on siliceous rocks on hills and mountain summits, where it forms crusts on exposed outcrops in cool, oceanic conditions.

Fryday recorded P. stellata together with a characteristic suite of other lichens that occupy similar habitats. On the New Zealand islands these include Fuscidea subasbolodes, Lithographa olivacea, Miriquidica effigurata, species of Placopsis and Rimularia maculata. On Desolación Island it has been collected on outcrops and moorland on hills at the head of the inner harbour of Bahía Tuesday, where it grows alongside species such as Fuscidea subasbolodes, Lithographa graphidioides, an unidentified Pertusaria and Poeltidea perusta, and Calvitimela austrochilenis. Within this restricted set of localities, P. stellata appears to be confined to high, windswept, siliceous substrates in strongly oceanic climates. In a subsequent biogeographical analysis it was treated as one of a small group of lichens forming an "oceanic Gondwanan" element of the southern cool-temperate and subantarctic flora, characterised by species restricted to south-west Chile and the New Zealand Campbell Plateau islands and absent from other southern subpolar regions such as Tierra del Fuego, the Falkland Islands, Îles Kerguelen and south-eastern Australia/Tasmania.

== See also ==
- List of Pertusaria species
