= Mount Fizeau =

Large landmass on Campbell Island

Coordinates: 52.51404°S 169.15526°E

Mount Fizeau is located on New Zealand's subantarctic Campbell Island. It was named by members of the 1874 French astronomical expedition to view the Transit of Venus, which set up on the island at Venus Bay. Mount Fizeau rises to a height of 497 metres (1655 ft), and is the second-highest point on the island.
