= 1874 Transit of Venus Expedition to Campbell Island =

French astronomic observation voyage to the New Zealand territory

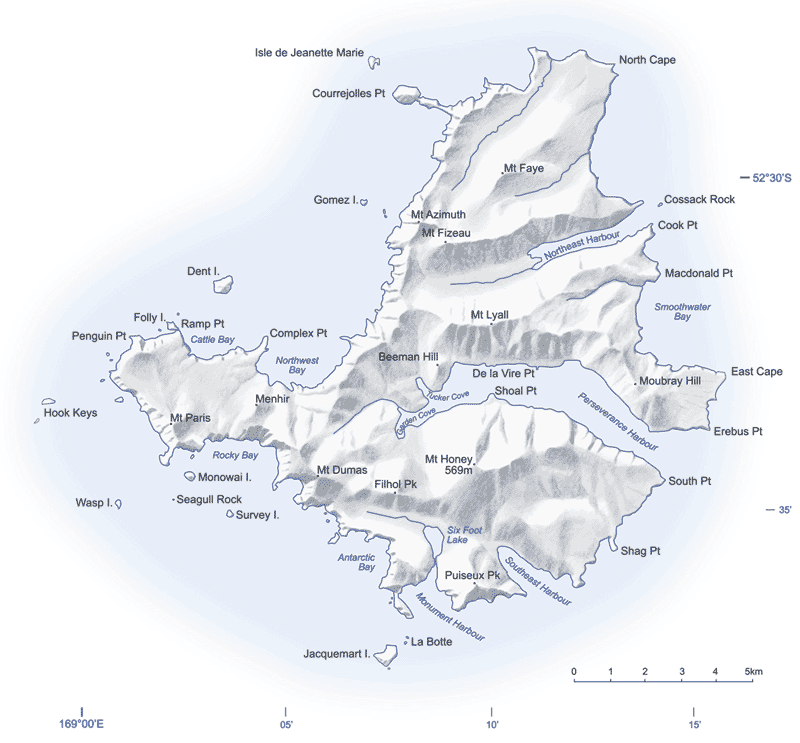
Map of the Campbell Islands

The 1874 Transit of Venus Expedition to Campbell Island was an astronomical expedition by French scientists to observe the 9 December 1874 transit of Venus on subantarctic Campbell Island in the Southern Ocean some 600 km south of New Zealand. It was one of several such scientific expeditions from various countries sent around the world to observe the rare astronomical event.

== Preparation ==
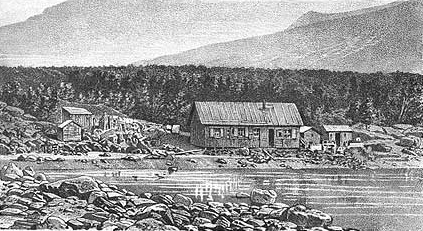
Expedition base on Campbell Island, 1874

The expedition was conducted under the auspices of the French Academy of Sciences which established a committee to plan the operation. A year before the transit was due, the French naval frigate FRWS Vire, based at Nouméa and commanded by Captain J. Jacquemart, visited the island from 28 November to 25 December 1873. The officers and crew of the ship made a thorough survey of the coastline and set up a platform for astronomical equipment on the headland between Camp Cove and Garden Cove in Perseverance Harbour and cleared a path to the beach. They also planted a garden with potatoes, cabbages and other vegetables.

The leader of the main expedition was A. Bouquet de la Grye, a naval hydrographer, assisted by hydrographer P. Hatt and naval officer Th. Courrejolles who was in charge of the photographic equipment. The fourth scientist was naturalist and expedition doctor Henri Filhol. They were accompanied by a support staff which included technicians, carpenters and mechanics. The expedition departed Marseille in June 1874. They reached Sydney on 21 August and joined the Vire which had brought equipment from Nouméa. They left Sydney on 2 September and arrived at Campbell Island on 9 September.

== Campbell Island ==
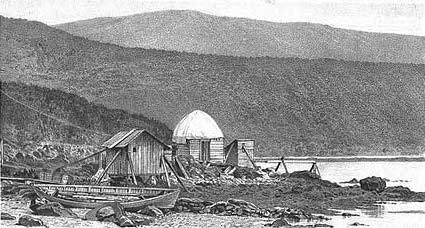
Observatory built by the expedition on Campbell Island, 1874

After briefly checking North East Harbour and rejecting it as a venue for their work, they continued to Perseverance Harbour and Garden Cove. There, finding that there was insufficient space for their encampment and equipment and that nothing had survived in the vegetable garden except for a few cabbages, they set up their camp in Venus Bay instead.

September was occupied by unloading the Vire, erecting several prefabricated buildings and constructing a 20 m stone jetty. Pens were built for the sheep and pigs brought as food. On 22 September one of the technicians, Paul Duris, died of typhoid fever and was buried on the point opposite Venus Bay. The encampment was ready for occupation on 1 October. From mid October until mid November the Vire was away and the expedition members filled their time testing their equipment and repairing that which had been damaged on the outward voyage. Filhol collected natural history specimens and observed the wildlife. The weather was not helpful; the expedition endured a series of storms which caused damage to the buildings.

On 9 December the skies were cloudy, though as the time of the transit approached the Sun appeared briefly giving the observers a view of Venus against the Sun's corona – a view obscured by clouds at the moment of first contact. They also had a twenty-second view of Venus at the end of the transit between third and fourth contacts as it was half off the Sun's disc. No useful measurements were able to be made.

It took three weeks for the expedition to dismantle their camp and load the ship. They departed on 28 December. Although observations and measurements of the transit had been unsuccessful, Filhol published a comprehensive account of his examination of the natural history of the island, while the chart produced by the naval officers subsequently formed the basis of maps of the island and British Admiralty charts for several decades. Many geographic features were named by the expedition after its own personnel and members of the transit committee in Paris, as well as for other expedition-related objects, including:

- Courrejolles Point
- De la Vire Point
- Filhol Peak
- Garden Cove
- Jacquemart Island
- Mount Azimuth
- Mount Dumas
- Mount Faye
- Mount Fizeau
- Mount Paris
- Puiseux Peak
- Venus Bay
- Yvon Villarceau Peak

== Other expeditions ==
The Campbell Island expedition was one of six French expeditions sent to observe the 1874 transit. The other two sites in the southern hemisphere were Île Saint-Paul in the Indian Ocean and Nouméa in New Caledonia, while in the northern hemisphere French astronomers visited Nagasaki in Japan, Beijing in China, and Saigon in Vietnam. Other countries which sent similar expeditions were the Netherlands, United Kingdom, Germany and the United States.
