= Campbell Island sheep =

Breed of sheep

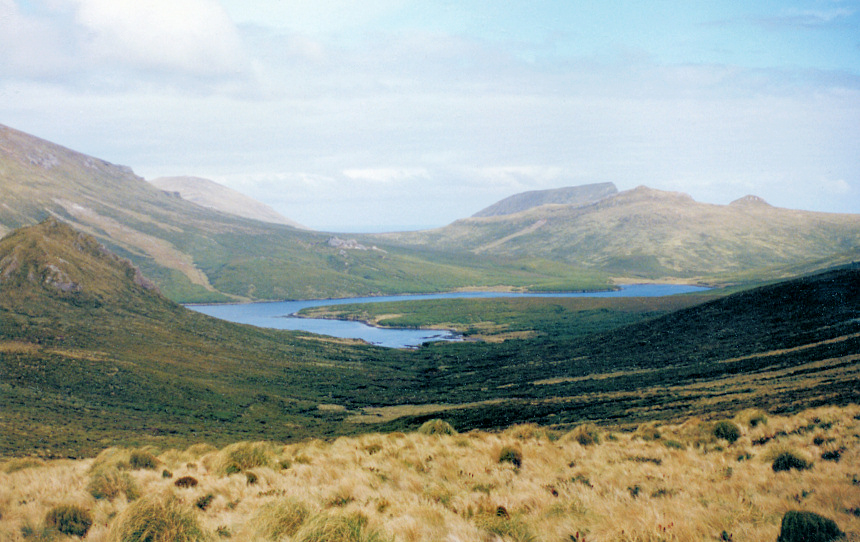
Campbell Island landscape

Campbell Island sheep were a feral breed of domestic sheep formerly found on New Zealand's subantarctic Campbell Island.

== History ==
=== The sheep farmers ===
The sheep were originally introduced to Campbell Island in the late 1890s, following the inclusion of the island in New Zealand’s pastoral lease system in 1896. The lease was first taken up by James Gordon of Gisborne, who shipped 400 sheep, along with timber for buildings, to the island. After financial difficulties, in 1900 the lease was bought out by Captain Tucker of the Gisborne Militia who stocked the island with at least three shipments of about 1,000 sheep, mainly merino or merino cross. Two businessmen from Otago, J. Mathewson and D. Murray, became the next lessees in 1916, forming the Campbell Island Company (later a Syndicate) to manage the farm, employing shepherds and shearers to work for one-year periods on the island.

In 1927 the lease was auctioned and bought by John Warren, a farmer from Waitati, who brought another 5000 sheep to the island. However, wool and meat prices slumped in 1929 and, two years later, a destitute Warren and his farm workers returned to the mainland, abandoning the farm and the sheep. The lease to the island was declared forfeit in 1934 and expired in 1937. That year the island was set aside for the preservation of its flora and fauna, though its gazettal as a nature reserve did not take place until 1954.

=== The sheep ===
With an initial abundance of palatable food, sheep numbers increased to a peak of 7-8000 in about 1913. Gradually, as the palatable plants became eaten out, the population went into a decline, with the flock down to 4000 in 1931 when it was abandoned. In 1958 a count of the sheep found about 1000 remaining.

However, there was some subsequent recovery in numbers. In 1970 a fence was built across the island with all 1300 sheep on the northern side being shot, with a similar number on the southern side being left for the time being. By the late 1980s all the remaining sheep were culled, after a rescue expedition in 1975/76 removed ten live sheep for captive breeding in New Zealand. Descendants of the rescued sheep were maintained as a purebred flock until 2005.
