= Frederick Hasselborough =

British Australian sealer

- Born: 1780?
- Died: 4 November, 1810; Perseverance Harbour
- Occupation: explorer
- Known for: discovering Campbell and Macquarie Island

Frederick Hasselborough, whose surname is also spelled Hasselburgh and Hasselburg, was an Australian sealer from Sydney who discovered Campbell (4 January 1810) and Macquarie Islands (11 July 1810).

On 4 November 1810, Hasselborough drowned in Perseverance Harbour when the jolly boat he was travelling in capsized in the wind. A woman and boy in the same boat were also killed while three men survived. Hasselborough's body was not recovered.
