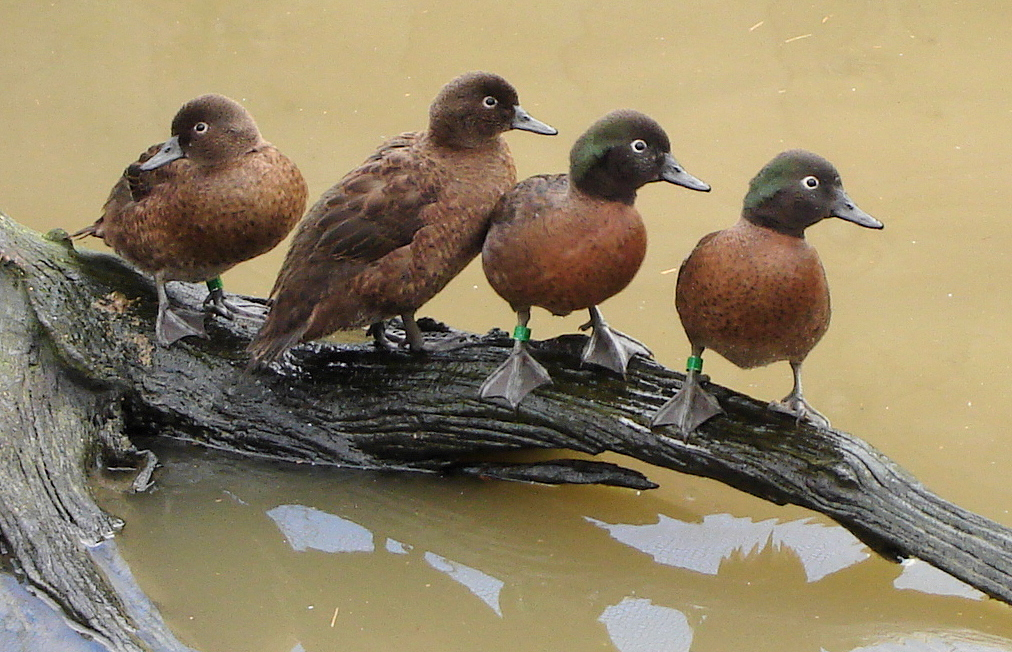

Conservation status
- Vulnerable (IUCN 3.1)
- CITES Appendix I

Scientific classification
- Kingdom: Animalia
- Phylum: Chordata
- Class: Aves
- Order: Anseriformes
- Family: Anatidae
- Genus: Anas
- Species: A. nesiotis

Binomial name
- Anas nesiotis (J. H. Fleming, 1935)
- Distribution map: Extant and assisted colonisation Extant Extant and reintroduced

Synonyms
- Anas aucklandica nesiotis

= Campbell teal =

Species of bird

The Campbell teal or Campbell Island teal (Anas nesiotis) is a small, flightless, nocturnal species of dabbling duck of the genus Anas endemic to the Campbell Island group of New Zealand. It is sometimes considered conspecific with the brown teal. The plumage is similar to that of the Auckland teal, dark sepia with the head and back tinged with green iridescence, and a chestnut breast on the male, with the female dark brown all over. Its natural habitat is tussock grassland dominated by Poa tussock grass, ferns and megaherbs. The species also uses the burrows and pathways of petrel species that nest on the islands. They are apparently territorial in the wild, and probably feed on amphipods and insects. The IUCN classifies it as vulnerable.

== Conservation ==
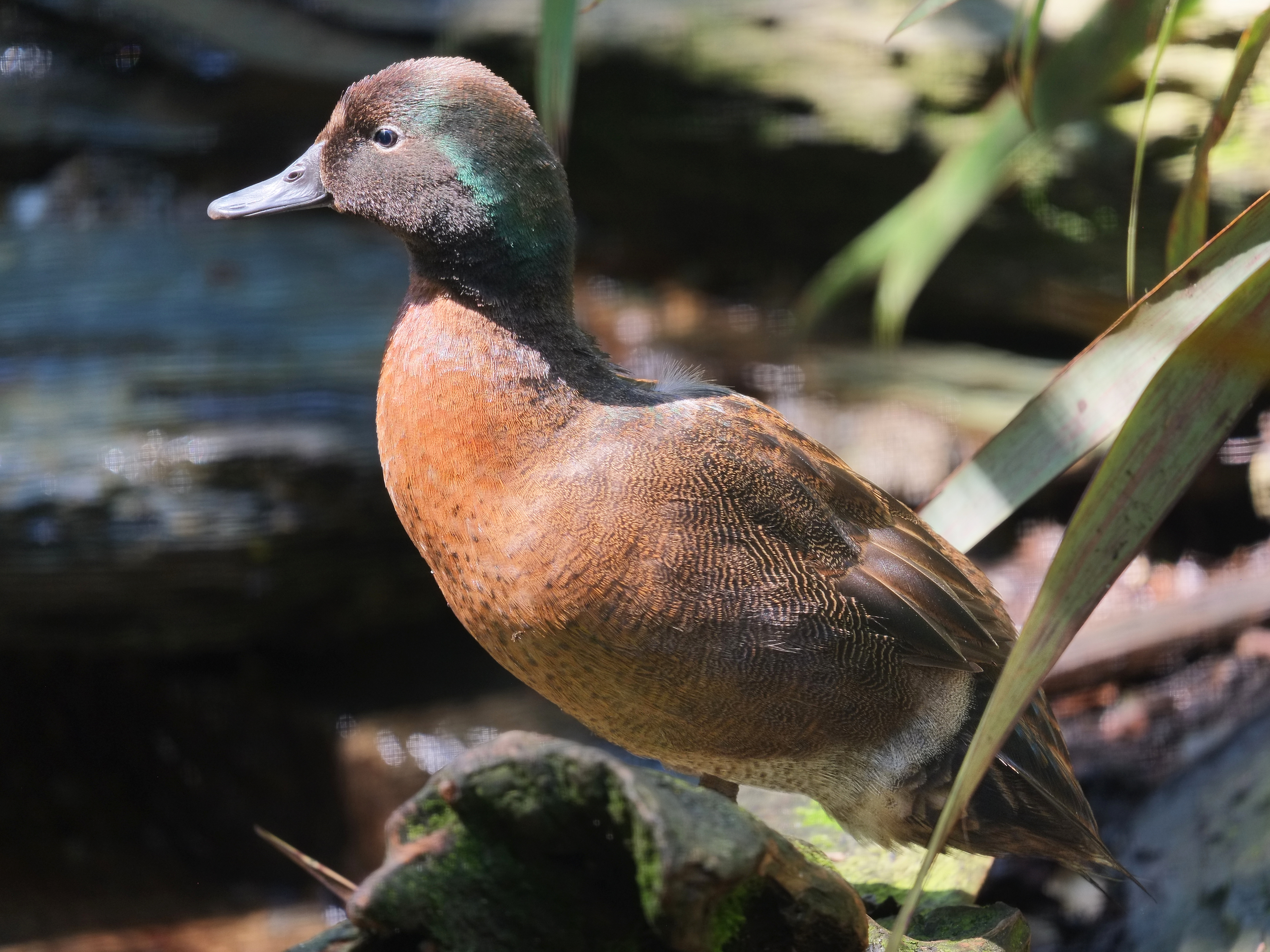

The Campbell teal was once found on Campbell Island / Motu Ihupuku, but was driven to extinction there by the introduction of Norway rats (which ate their eggs and chicks), and was for a while presumed extinct. In 1975 it was rediscovered on Dent Island, a small (23 hectare) islet near Campbell that had remained rat-free. The population was so small that a single event could have driven it to complete extinction; to prevent this from happening, 11 individuals were taken into captivity by the Department of Conservation for captive breeding at the Pūkaha / Mount Bruce National Wildlife Centre in 1984 while the rest followed in 1990. They were also put on the list of critically endangered species in 1979.

Captive breeding was initially very difficult to achieve, as no studies on the behaviour of the species had been carried out in the wild and "staff [at Mount Bruce] thus had to experiment with a range of techniques to encourage breeding. Success came in 1994 when Daisy, the only wild origin female to ever lay eggs in captivity, finally accepted a mate. Subsequently, breeding has occurred every year – wild origin males contributed genes by pairing with captive raised females."

A tiny population of 25 captive-bred individuals was released on Codfish Island / Whenua Hou in 1999 and 2000, already intensively managed and pest-free as an important habitat for the critically endangered kākāpō. In the final phase of the ecological restoration of Campbell Island (cattle, sheep and cats had already been removed), the world's largest rat eradication campaign was undertaken by helicopter drops of more than 120 tonnes of poisoned bait over the entirety of the island's 11,331 hectare area in 2001; this operation successfully removed what was estimated to be the world's densest population of Norway rats (200,000) from Campbell Island and it was officially declared rat free in 2003. Fifty Campbell teal, a mix of captive-bred and wild-acclimatised animals (from Codfish / Whenua Hou), were reintroduced to Campbell Island in mid-2004, after an absence of more than a century. Subsequent monitoring in 2005 has shown that the majority of these birds are now thriving in their ancestral homeland. By 2011 the species has firmly been returned to Campbell Island, resulting in a reclassification of its threat status to endangered, and vulnerable again in 2020.
