= Mount Honey =

Large landmass on Campbell Island in the subantarctic South Pacific

Coordinates: 52.57101°S 169.16574°E

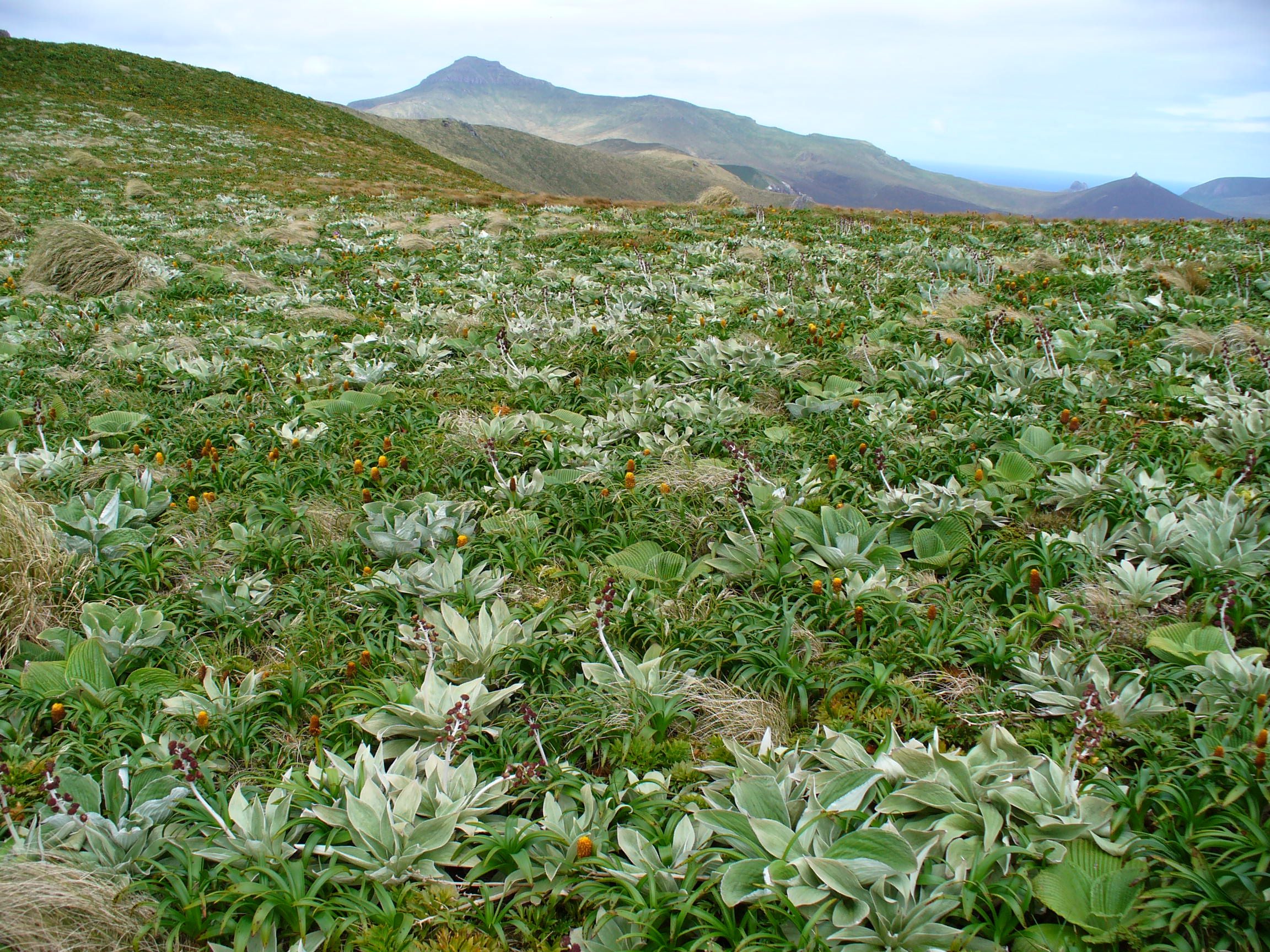
Mount Honey

Mount Honey is the highest point on Campbell Island, the southernmost of New Zealand's subantarctic outlying islands. It is located to the south of Perseverance Harbour, a long lateral fissure which reaches the ocean in the island's southeast, and rises to a height of 558 metres (1,831 ft).
