= Perseverance Harbour =

Fiord in Campbell Island

- Location within Oceania
- Location: Campbell Island / Motu Ihupuku
- Coordinates: 52.552°S 169.195°E

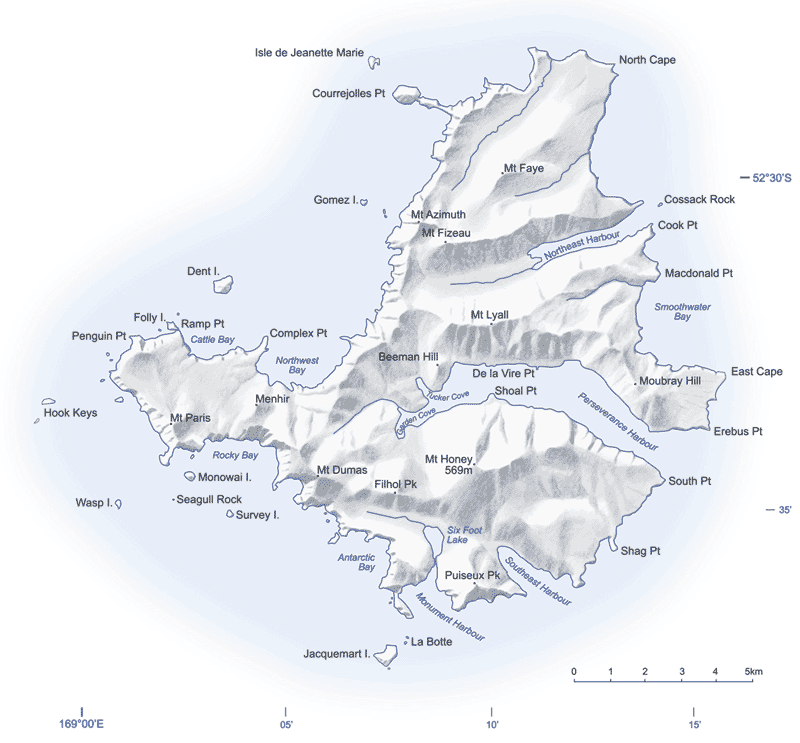
Map of Campbell Island / Motu Ihupuku

Perseverance Harbour, also known as South harbour, is a large indentation in the coast of Campbell Island / Motu Ihupuku, one of New Zealand's subantarctic outlying islands. The harbour is a long lateral fissure which reaches the ocean in the island's southeast, and is overlooked by the island's highest point, Mount Honey. The Campbell Island Meteorological Station lies at the western end of the harbour.

On 4 November 1810, the island's discoverer, Captain Frederick Hasselborough (or "Hasselburgh" or "Hasselburg"; there are several spellings), who had returned from Sydney, was drowned in Perseverance Harbour, together with Elizabeth Farr, a young woman born at Norfolk Island, and a 12/13 year old Sydney boy, George Allwright.
