= Campbell Island, New Zealand =

Island in New Zealand

Campbell Island / Motu Ihupuku
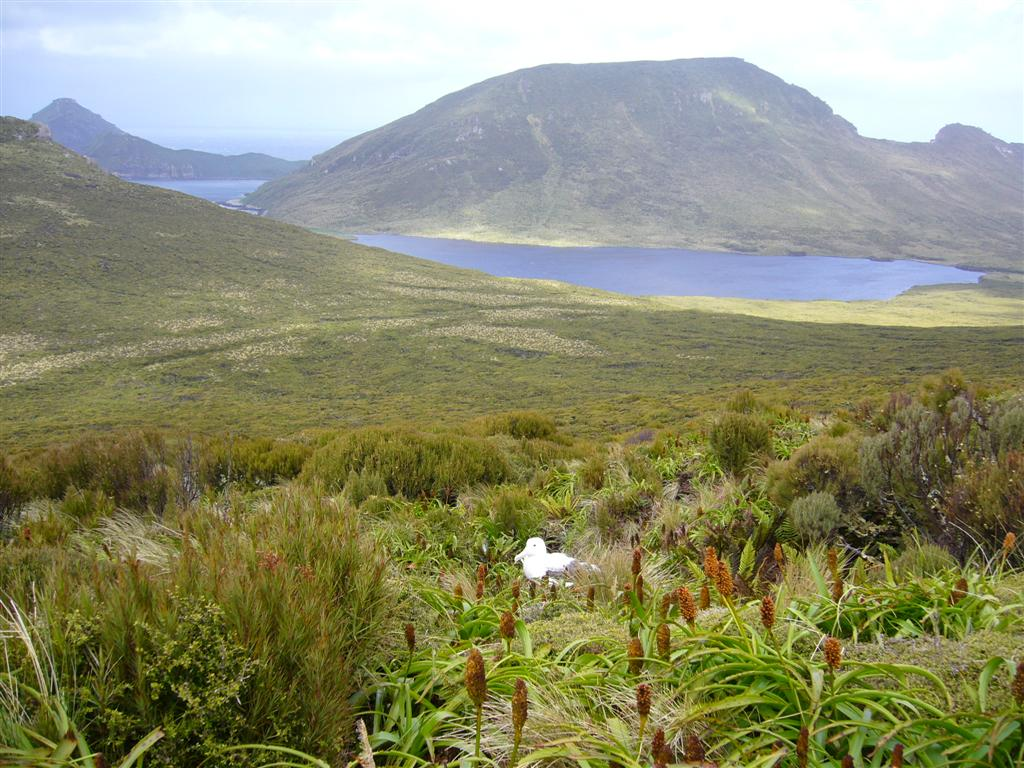
- Six Foot Lake, on Campbell Island / Motu Ihupuku

- Map of Campbell Island / Motu Ihupuku

- Location of Campbell Island / Motu Ihupuku in the Pacific
- Etymology: Robert Campbell/ Island (motu) of fur seals (ihupuku)

Geography
- Location: Pacific Ocean
- Coordinates: 52°32′24″S 169°8′42″E
- Archipelago: Campbell Islands
- Area: 112.68 km^{2} (43.51 sq mi)
- Highest elevation: 569 m (1867 ft)
- Highest point: Mount Honey

Administration
- New Zealand

Demographics
- Population: 0

Additional information
- Time zone: NZST (UTC+12)
  - Summer (DST): NZDST (UTC+13)
- UN/LOCODE: TF

Campbell Island / Motu Ihupuku is an uninhabited subantarctic island of New Zealand, and the main island of the Campbell Island group. The island lies around 660 km (410 mi) south of New Zealand's South Island. It covers 112.68 square kilometres (43.51 sq mi) of the group's 113.31 km^{2} (43.75 sq mi), and is surrounded by numerous stacks, rocks and islets like Dent Island, Folly Island (or Folly Islands), Isle de Jeanette-Marie, and Jacquemart Island, the latter being the southernmost extremity of New Zealand. It is mountainous, rising to over 500 metres (1,640 ft) in the south. A long fiord, Perseverance Harbour, nearly bisects it, opening out to sea on the east coast.

The island is listed with the New Zealand Outlying Islands. The island is an immediate part of New Zealand, but not part of any region or district, but instead Area Outside Territorial Authority, like all other outlying islands, other than the Solander Islands.

Campbell Island was gazetted as a nature reserve in 1954, and listed as a UNESCO World Heritage Site in 1998 as part of the designation of all of the New Zealand Subantarctic Islands.

== History ==
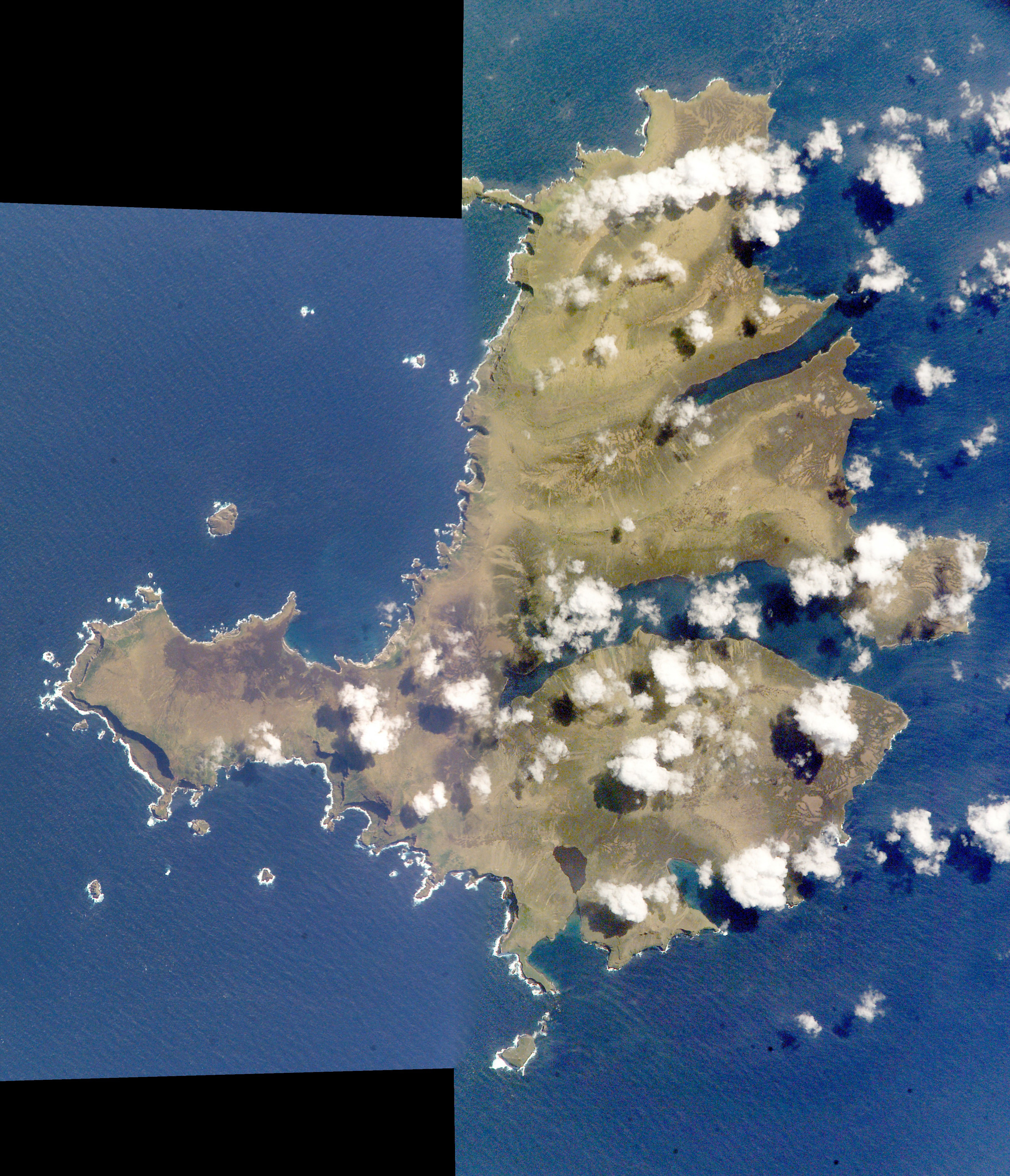
Campbell Island / Motu Ihupuku as viewed from the International Space Station

Campbell Island was discovered in 1810 by Captain Frederick Hasselborough of the sealing brig Perseverance, which was owned by Robert Campbell's Sydney-based company Campbell & Co. (whence the island's name). Captain Hasselborough drowned on 4 November 1810 in Perseverance Harbour on the south of the island, along with a young woman and a boy.

Unlike the Auckland Islands to the north, no archaeological evidence has been found of pre-European settlement in the Campbell Islands. The island's remoteness, lack of tree cover and severe climate mitigated against this.

The island became a seal hunting base, and the seal population was almost totally eradicated. The first sealing boom was over by the mid-1810s. The second was a brief revival in the 1820s. The sealing era lasted from 1810 till 1912 during which time 49 vessels are recorded visiting for sealing purposes, one of which was lost off the coast.

The whaling boom extended here in the 1830s and '40s. In 1874, the island was visited by a French scientific expedition intending to view the transit of Venus. Much of the island's topography is named after aspects of, or people connected with, the expedition.

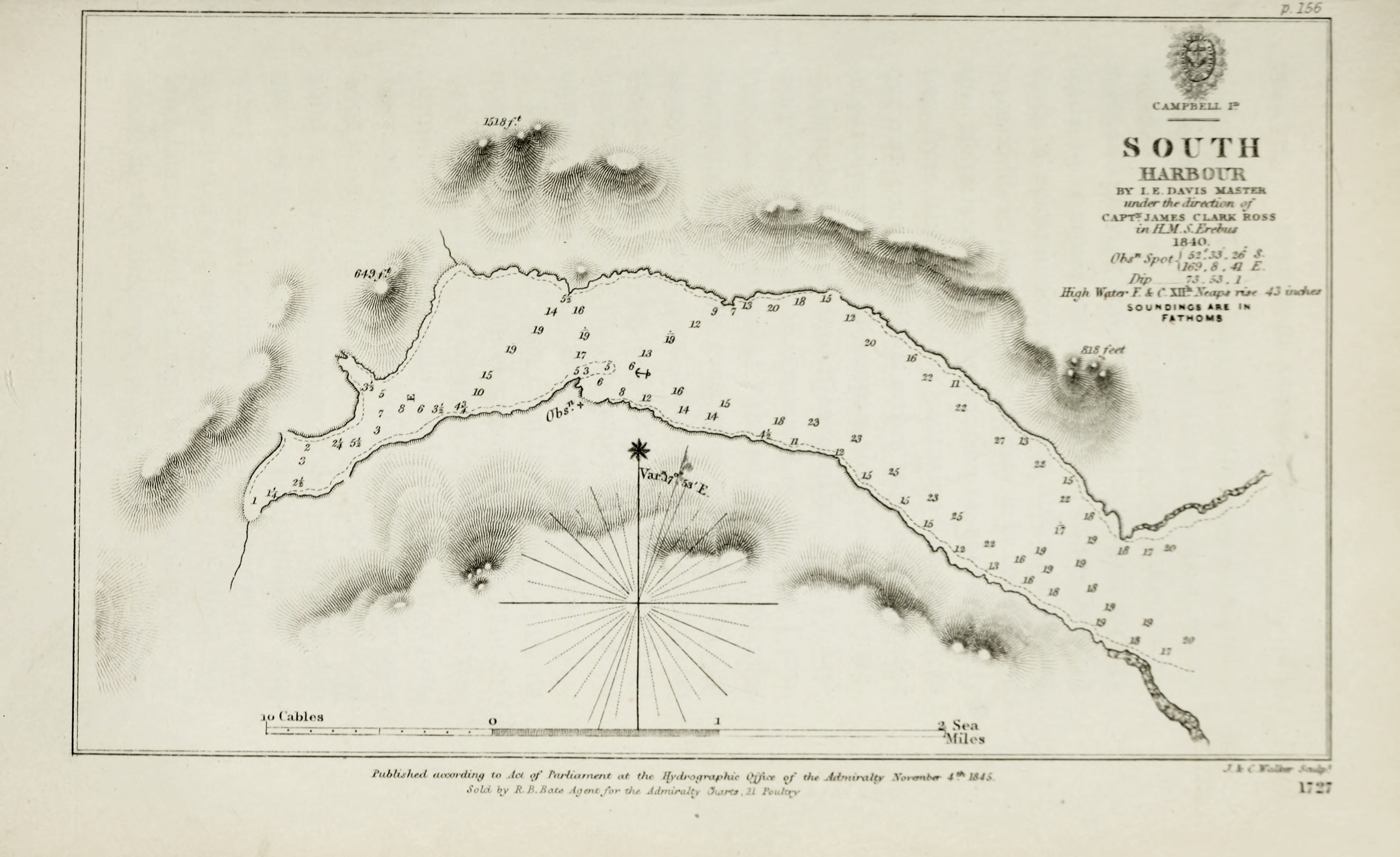
Chart of South Harbour, Campbell Island, 1840, by J.E. Davis, master

In December 1840 Campbell Island was the last landfall before the Ross expedition explored the Antarctic.

In 1883 the American schooner Sarah W. Hunt, a whaler, was near Campbell Island. Twelve men in two small whaleboats headed for the island in terrible weather looking for seals. One of the boats disappeared, and the other boat with six men aboard managed to make it ashore. Sanford Miner, the captain of the Sarah W. Hunt, assumed all the whalers were lost, and sailed away to Lyttelton, New Zealand. Fortunately for the stranded whalers, a seal protection boat, the Kekeno, happened to arrive at the island, and rescued the castaways. The captain's behaviour caused an international scandal.

In the late 19th century, the island became a pastoral lease. Sheep farming was undertaken from 1896 until the lease, along with the sheep and a small herd of cattle, was abandoned in 1931 because of the Great Depression.

In 1907, a group of scientists spent eight days on the island group surveying. The 1907 Sub-Antarctic Islands Scientific Expedition conducted a magnetic survey and also took botanical, zoological and geological specimens.

During World War II, a coastwatching station was operative at Tucker Cove at the north shore of Perseverance Harbour as part of the Cape Expedition programme.

In 1992, a Campbell Island scene was incorporated into the reverse side design of the New Zealand five-dollar note in the fifth series of New Zealand bank notes. The scene includes a yellow-eyed penguin or hoiho (Megadyptes antipodes), a subantarctic lily (Bulbinella rossii), a daisy (Pleurophyllum speciosum), and bull kelp or rimurapa (Durvillaea antarctica).

Following the passage of the Ngāi Tahu Claims Settlement Act 1998, the name of the island was officially altered to Campbell Island / Motu Ihupuku.

An amateur radio DXpedition organised by the Hellenic Amateur Radio Association of Australia visited Campbell Island during November–December 2012. The team consisted of ten amateur radio operators from around the world, a NZ Department of Conservation Officer, and the ship's crew of six, including the captain, on the sailing vessel "Evohe". The ZL9HR DXpedition team made 42,922 on-air contacts during an eight-day operating period.

== Weather station ==
Campbell Island Automatic Weather Station
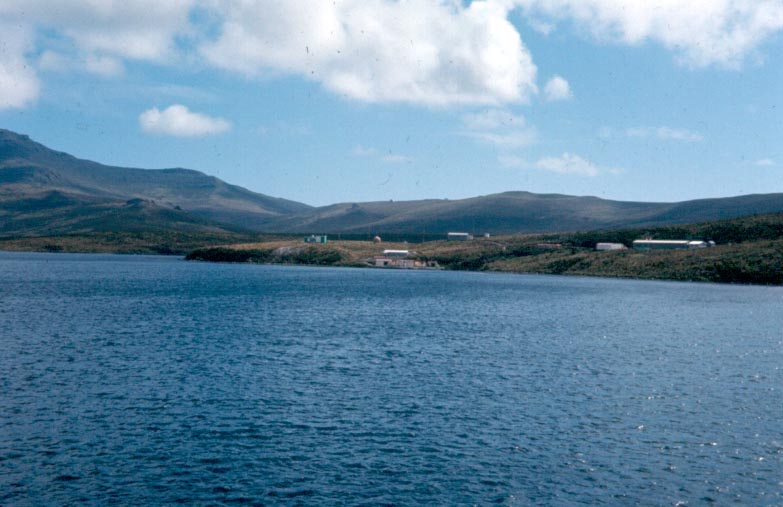
- Meteorological station at Beeman Cove (unmanned/automatic since 1995)

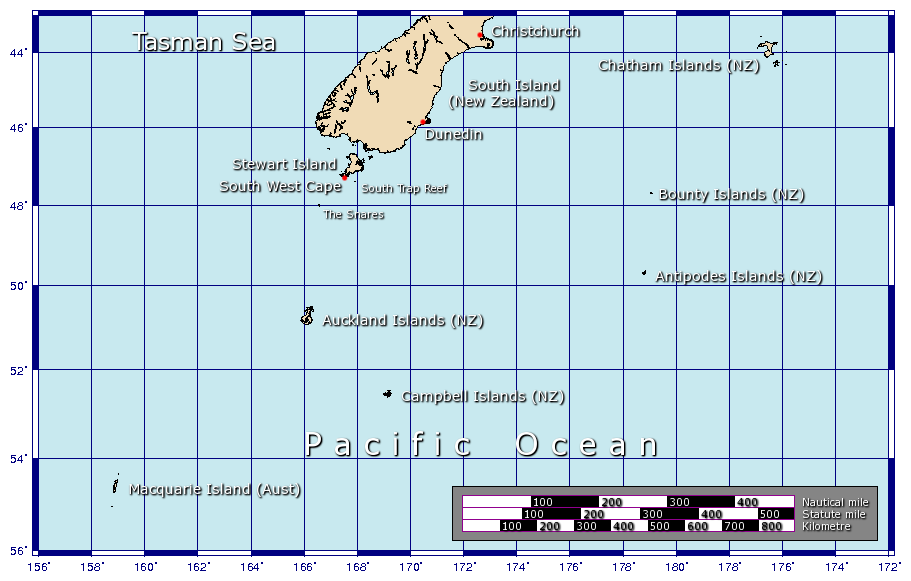
- Location in the New Zealand Subantarctic Islands

General information
- Type: Automatic weather station
- Coordinates: 52°33′04″S 169°09′04″E
- Opened: 1946
- Owner: MetService

After World War II, the coast watching station at Tucker Cove was converted for use as a meteorological station until the summer of 1958, when a new base was established at Beeman Cove, a few hundred metres further east. The new location provided improved exposure for the weather instruments, particularly wind recordings, and more modern accommodation for up to 12 full-time staff.

The new meteorological station (WMO ID 93944) at Beeman Cove was operated by the New Zealand Meteorological Service with ten full-time staff. Each team undertook 12-month expeditions to the island to undertake three hourly weather reports and twice daily radiosonde flights using hydrogen filled balloons. Weather reports were radioed back to New Zealand using HF radio to ZLW Wellington Radio. In addition to its primary purpose as a meteorological station, staff at the station also operated a seismic monitoring station, made measurements of the Earth's magnetic field, the ionosphere, and aurora australis, and undertook Albatross banding and whale counts of primarily Southern Right Whales for the New Zealand Wildlife Service.

In April 1992, staff of the weather station were snorkelling at Northwest Bay when one of them, Mike Fraser, was attacked by a great white shark some 30 metres (100 ft) offshore from the beach at Middle Bay. Fraser managed to return to shore with the assistance of one of his team, Jacinda Amey, after suffering severe lacerations to both his arms. The team kept Fraser alive at the bay—some four kilometres (2.5 mi) from the main base—while a rescue helicopter from Taupō was called and made an emergency flight to the island to repatriate him to Invercargill Hospital. This was the longest ever single-engine helicopter rescue in the world. Jacinda Amey was awarded the New Zealand Cross—the highest bravery medal for civilians—for assisting the injured team member from the water. The rescue helicopter pilot, John Funnell, was awarded the New Zealand Bravery Medal.

In 1995, station staff were permanently withdrawn when the manual weather observation programme was replaced by an automated weather station, and the upper air soundings ceased. Today periodic visits to the island are undertaken by Meteorological Service staff to maintain the weather station on Royal New Zealand Navy vessels, which also transport conservation staff undertaking field research. Other visitors to the island include occasional summer time eco-tourism cruises.

In May 2018, scientists in New Zealand documented what they believe is the largest wave ever recorded in the Southern Hemisphere to date. The 23.8-metre (78 ft) wave was measured by a weather buoy near the island.

== The legend of The Lady of the Heather ==
The Lady of the Heather is the title of a 1945 romantic novel by Will Lawson. The novel is a mixture of facts and fiction elaborating on the incidents surrounding Captain Hasselburg's death on Campbell Island. The story is about a daughter of Bonnie Prince Charlie, exiled to Campbell Island after she is suspected of treachery to the Jacobite cause. Her character was inspired by Elizabeth Farr who drowned at Campbell Island, aged 14. The death of a young woman at this remote place gave rise to The Lady of the Heather story. The accident happened when William Tucker was present on the Aurora. Tucker was another unusual character in the sealing era who became the source of a legend and a novel. The remoteness and striking appearance of the sealing grounds, whether on mainland New Zealand or the subantarctic islands, and the sealing era's early place in Australasia's European history, supply the elements for romance and legend which are generally absent in the area's colonial history.

== Climate ==
Campbell Island has a maritime tundra climate (Köppen ET). The island receives only 647 hours of bright sunshine annually and it can expect less than an hour's sunshine on 215 days (59%) of the year. The peaks of the island are frequently obscured by clouds. It has an annual rainfall of 1,329 millimetres (52.3 in), with rain, mainly light showers or drizzle (although it often snows in the winter and spring), falling on an average of 325 days a year. It is a windy place, with gusts of over 96 kilometres per hour (50 kn; 60 mph) occurring on at least 100 days each year. Variations in daily and annual temperatures are small with a mean annual temperature of 7 °C (44.6 °F), rarely rising above 12.1 °C (53.8 °F). The warmest temperature ever recorded was 21.2 °C (70.2 °F) and the coldest was −7.9 °C (17.8 °F).

Climate data for Campbell Island (1991–2020 normals)
Month	Jan	Feb	Mar	Apr	May	Jun	Jul	Aug	Sep	Oct	Nov	Dec	Year
Record high °C (°F)	21.2 (70.2)	19.3 (66.7)	16.1 (61.0)	15.8 (60.4)	12.4 (54.3)	11.3 (52.3)	10.3 (50.5)	10.4 (50.7)	12.7 (54.9)	15.4 (59.7)	18.3 (64.9)	20.0 (68.0)	21.2 (70.2)
Mean daily maximum °C (°F)	12.0 (53.6)	11.8 (53.2)	10.9 (51.6)	9.6 (49.3)	8.4 (47.1)	7.1 (44.8)	7.0 (44.6)	7.4 (45.3)	7.9 (46.2)	8.8 (47.8)	9.8 (49.6)	11.5 (52.7)	9.4 (48.9)
Daily mean °C (°F)	9.6 (49.3)	9.5 (49.1)	8.8 (47.8)	7.7 (45.9)	6.5 (43.7)	5.0 (41.0)	5.1 (41.2)	5.3 (41.5)	5.7 (42.3)	6.3 (43.3)	7.2 (45.0)	8.9 (48.0)	7.1 (44.8)
Mean daily minimum °C (°F)	7.2 (45.0)	7.2 (45.0)	6.7 (44.1)	5.7 (42.3)	4.5 (40.1)	3.0 (37.4)	3.2 (37.8)	3.2 (37.8)	3.6 (38.5)	3.9 (39.0)	4.7 (40.5)	6.4 (43.5)	4.9 (40.8)
Record low °C (°F)	2.9 (37.2)	2.3 (36.1)	0.5 (32.9)	0.0 (32.0)	−3.2 (26.2)	−6.5 (20.3)	−7.9 (17.8)	−6.4 (20.5)	−4.2 (24.4)	−1.4 (29.5)	−1.2 (29.8)	3.2 (37.8)	−7.9 (17.8)
Average precipitation mm (inches)	124.7 (4.91)	102.2 (4.02)	124.1 (4.89)	121.1 (4.77)	133.6 (5.26)	113.6 (4.47)	115.0 (4.53)	108.1 (4.26)	112.9 (4.44)	114.3 (4.50)	118.1 (4.65)	114.6 (4.51)	1,402.3 (55.21)
Average precipitation days (≥ 1.0 mm)	18.8	17.5	20.3	19.3	22.6	22.2	22.8	21.6	20.6	22.2	19.6	18.5	246.2
Mean monthly sunshine hours	74.8	72.4	66.4	48.6	39.4	29.2	31.3	34.5	52.2	63.4	62.9	72.2	647.3
Source 1: NOAA
Source 2: NIWA National Climate Database (sunshine and extremes)

== Flora and fauna ==
=== Important Bird Area ===
Campbell Island is the most important breeding area of the southern royal albatross. The island is part of the Campbell Island group Important Bird Area (IBA), identified as such by BirdLife International because of its significance as a breeding site for several species of seabirds as well as the endemic Campbell teal and Campbell snipe. Campbell Island also hosts numerous penguin species that breed on the island, including the yellow-eyed penguin, the rockhopper penguin, and the erect-crested penguin. Other albatross species breed on the island as well, such as the endemic Campbell albatross, a few pairs of Antipodean albatross, the light-mantled sooty albatross, Black-browed mollymawk and the grey-headed mollymawk. Other bird species that breed on the island include the sooty shearwater, the grey petrel, the white-chinned petrel, the endemic Campbell Island shag, the grey duck, the southern skua, the southern black-backed gull, the red-billed gull, the Antarctic tern, the song thrush, the Common blackbird, the Dunnock (Hedge sparrow), the New Zealand pipit, the white-eye, the lesser redpoll, the chaffinch, and the starling.

=== World's most remote tree ===
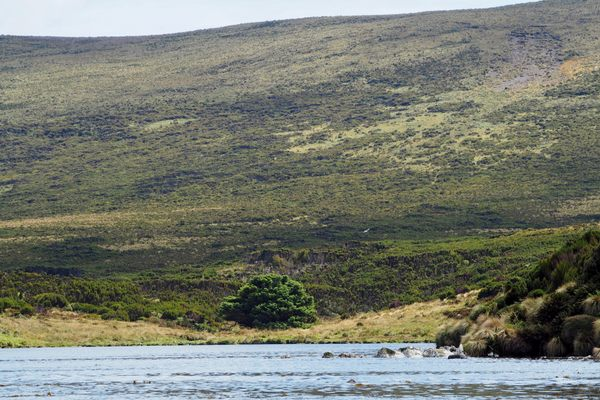
Nicknamed "Ranfurly Tree", after Lord Ranfurly, who is believed to have planted it there sometime between 1901 and 1907.

Campbell Island is home to what is believed to be the world's most remote tree – a solitary Sitka spruce, more than 100 years old. The nearest tree is over 274 kilometres (170 mi) away on the Auckland Islands. The tree is believed to have been introduced by Lord Ranfurly between 1901 and 1907. Australian academics have proposed designating the tree as a golden-spike signal-marker for the start of the anthropocene epoch.

=== World's most southerly Great White attack ===
The waters around Campbell Island are the site of the most southerly recorded attack by a great white shark on a human.

Mike Fraser was snorkelling off the island in Northwest Bay, when a great white tore off his arm and swam away. He said in an interview with the Dominion ‘[f]irst I knew, it hit me on the side ... I got back to the surface and I was face to face with a shark. I started using my knees and feet. ... I thought my number was up. ... It had a mouthful of my arm and had a feed. The fact my arm came off may have satisfied him a bit’.

His rescuers Jacinda Amey and John Funnell were given awards for bravery, and Mike Fraser had to be airlifted to hospital: the rescue involved a helicopter flying over 2,000 kilometres.

=== Conservation ===
In 1954, the island was gazetted as a nature reserve. Feral Campbell Island cattle were eliminated by about 1984, and feral Campbell Island sheep were culled during the 1970s and 1980s, with their eventual extermination in 1992. In 2001, brown rats (Norway rats) were eradicated from the island nearly 200 years after their introduction. This was the world's largest rat eradication programme. The island's rat-free status was confirmed in 2003. Since the eradication, vegetation and invertebrates have been recovering, seabirds have been returning and the Campbell teal, the world's rarest duck, has been reintroduced. An undescribed Cyanoramphus parakeet was discovered (in fossil bones) in 2004, along with evidence of a falcon or harrier. Banded dotterel (Charadrius bicinctus) are also believed to have inhabited the island at one point. Other native landbirds include the New Zealand pipit and the Campbell snipe, a race of the Subantarctic snipe, Coenocorypha aucklandica, described race perseverance. It was discovered only in 1997 on a tiny rat-free island off the south coast, Jacquemart Island. The snipe had survived there and began recolonising the main island after the rats had been removed.

Marine mammals have shown gradual recovery in the past decades. Sea lions and southern elephant seals have begun to re-colonise the island. Some southern right whales still come into bays in the winter to winter or calve, most notably at Northwest Bay and Perseverance Harbour, but in much smaller number than in the Auckland Islands. Historically, fin whales used to inhabit close to shore.

The area is one of five subantarctic island groups designated as a World Heritage Site by UNESCO.

== Geology ==
Campbell Island is an extinct alkaline shield volcano that marine erosion has worn down into its present shape. The volcano has been extinct for some six million years, and glacial ice cover prevented vegetation from growing on the island until approximately 15,000 years ago. Basalt, hawaiite, mugearite and trachyte are the dominant volcanic rocks comprising Campbell Island. They were erupted between 6.5 and 11 million years ago during the Miocene epoch. The island is considered to be part of the submerged continent of Zealandia.

== Research ==
During World War II, the Cape Expedition coast watching programme included trained naturalists who made observations of the geology, flora, and fauna of Campbell Island.

To mark the 200th anniversary of its discovery, the Campbell Island Bicentennial Expedition (CIBE) was undertaken from December 2010 to February 2011. The research expedition was the largest multidisciplinary expedition to the island in over 20 years, and aimed to document the island's human history, assess recovery of the island's flora and invertebrate fauna since the removal of sheep and the world's largest rat eradication programme, study the island's plentiful but little understood streams and characterise the unusual stream fauna, and reconstruct past environmental conditions and deduce long term climate change from tarn sediment cores.

The expedition was run by the 50 Degrees South Trust, a charitable organisation established to further research and education on New Zealand's Subantarctic Islands, and to support the preservation and management of these World Heritage ecosystems. The expedition and the programme outputs can be followed at the CIBE website.

== Gallery ==
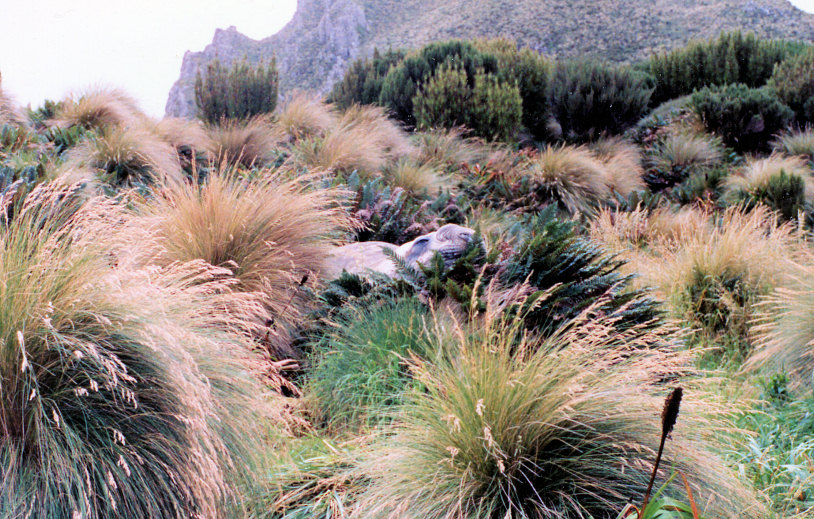
Vagrant adolescent male elephant seal Mirounga leonina resting in the tussock grasses

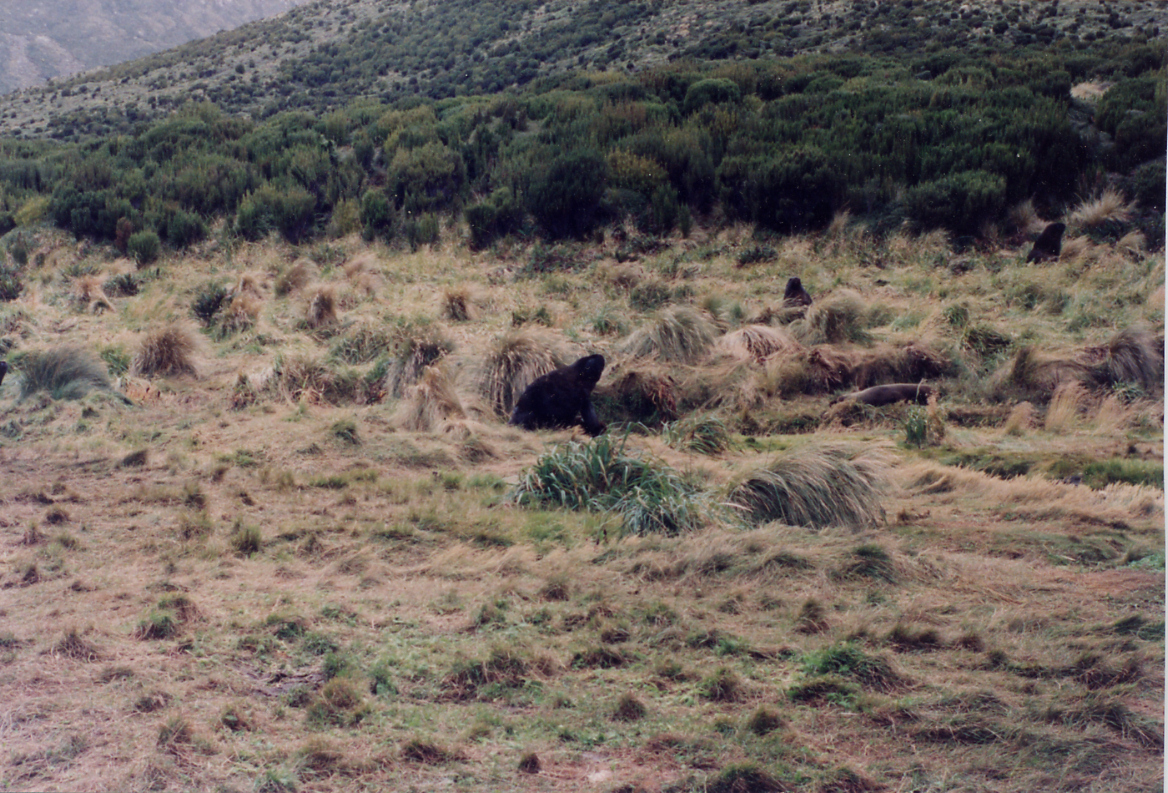
New Zealand sea lions disporting themselves among the tussock grass

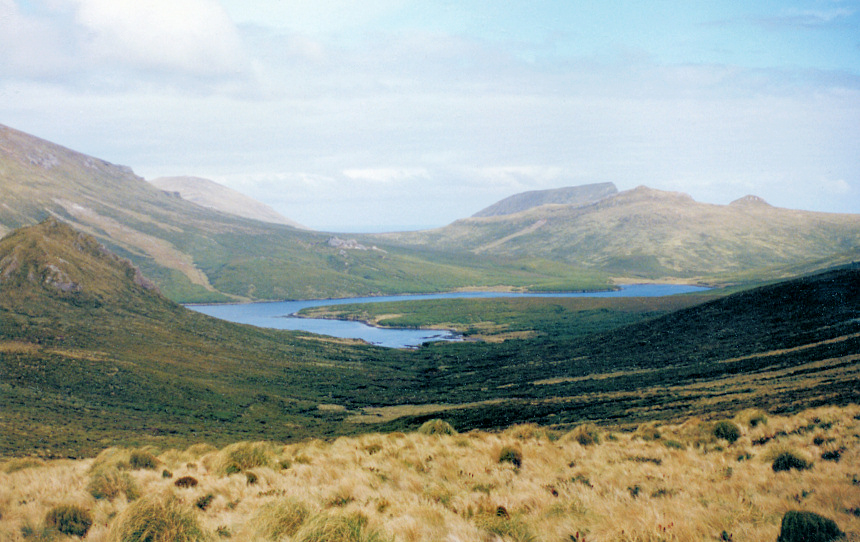
Campbell Island landscape (taken during an unusually warm and dry late summer)

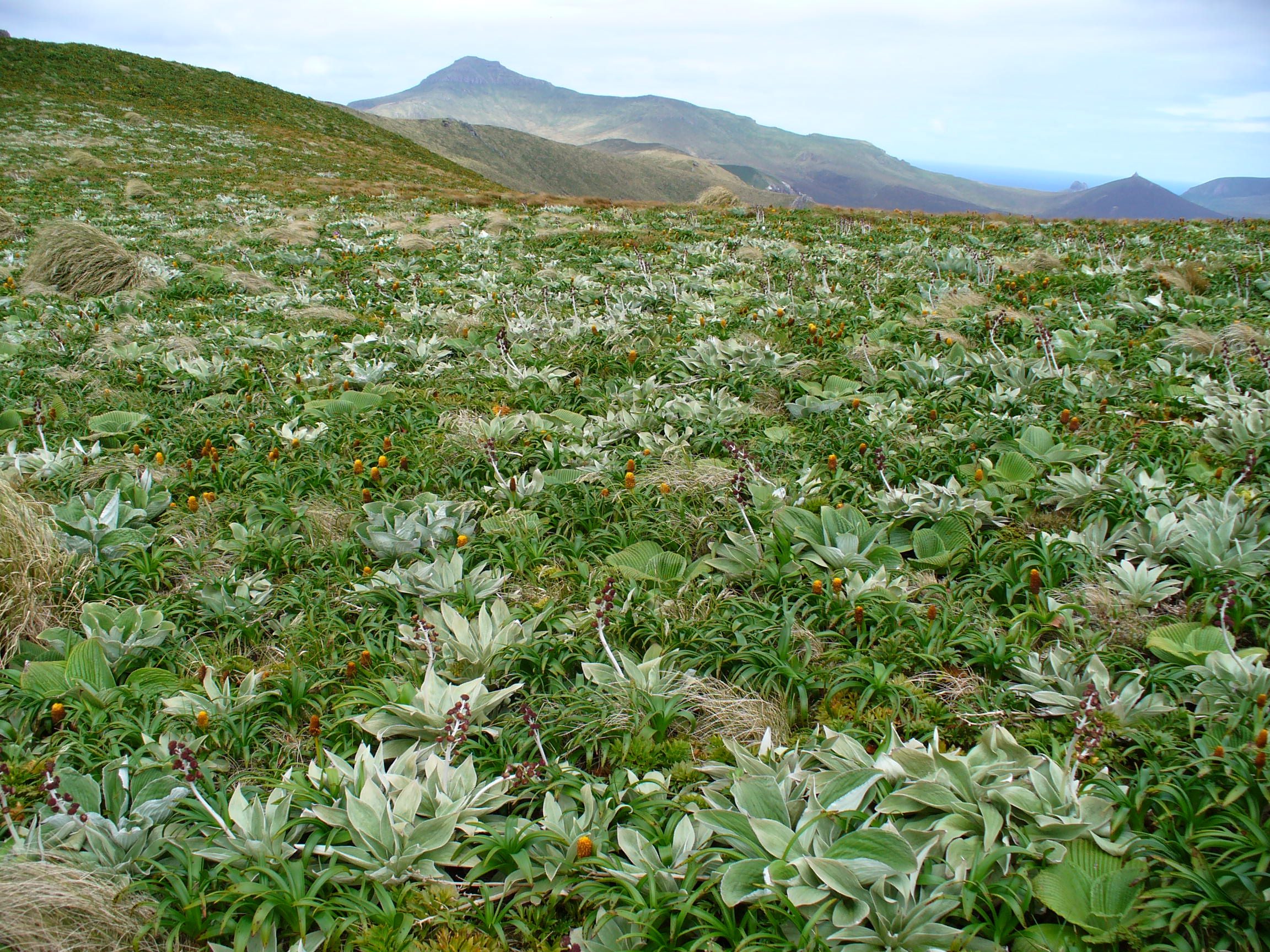
Campbell Island landscape with a megaherb community in the foreground

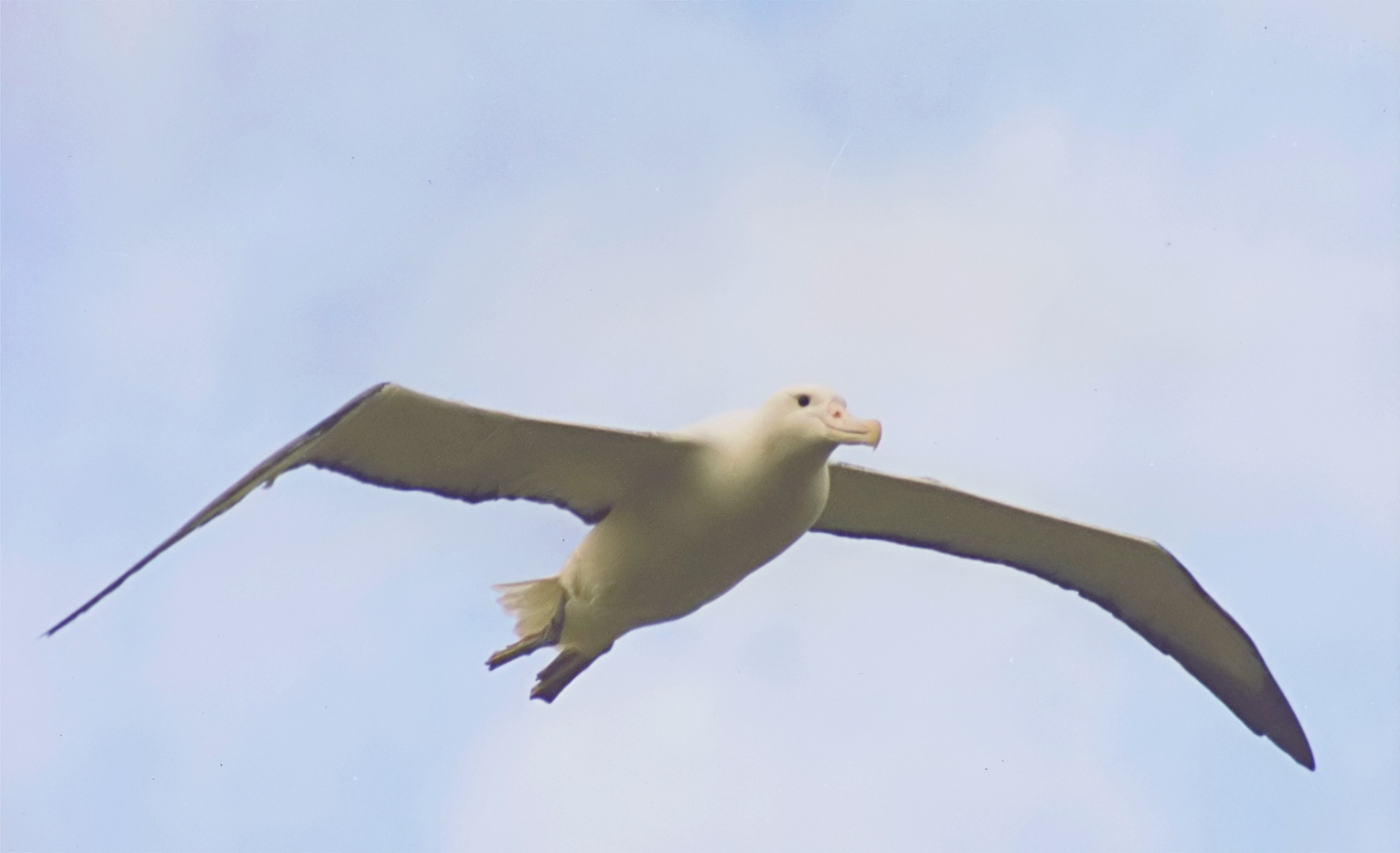
Southern royal albatross in flight

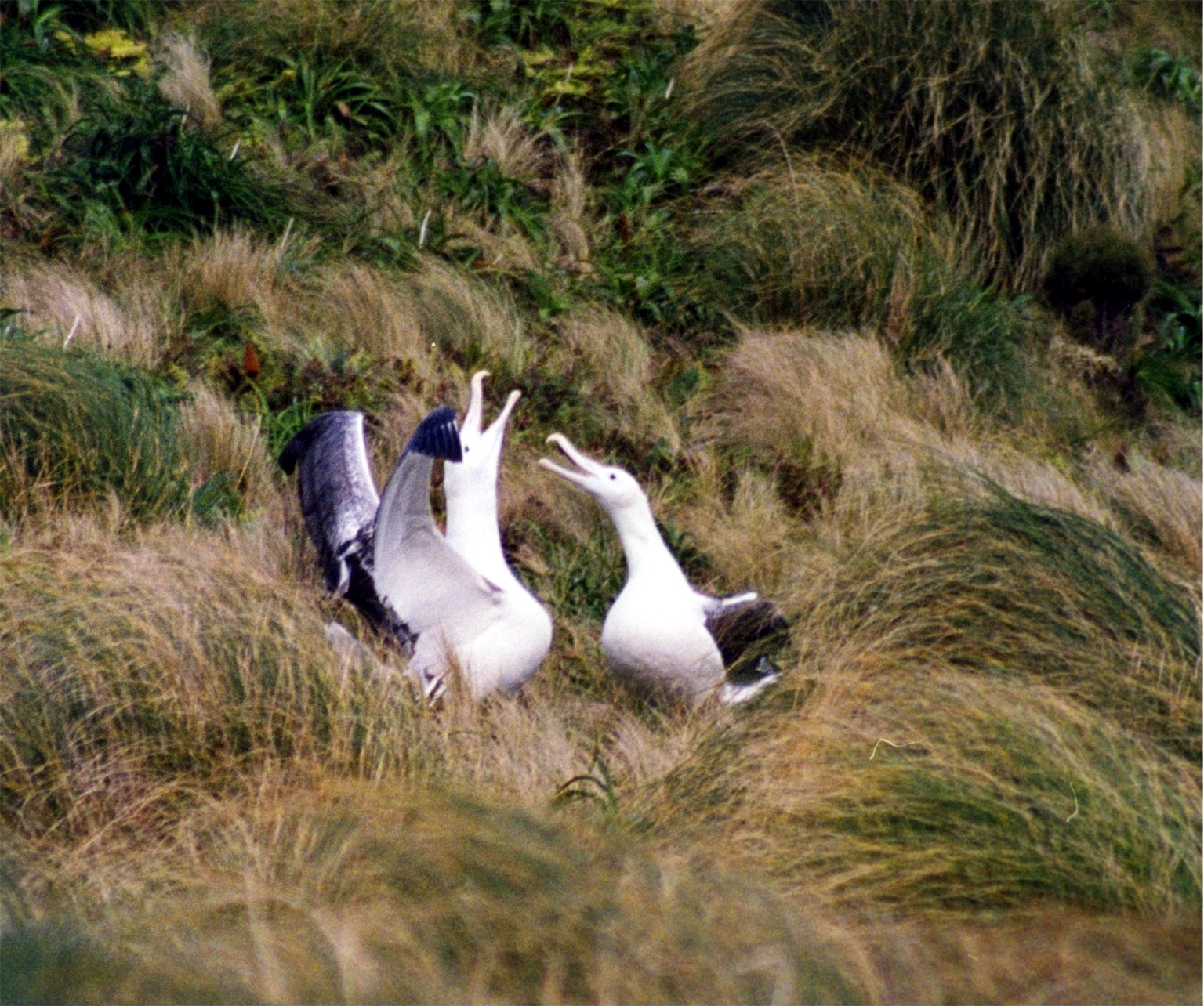
Pair of southern royal albatrosses

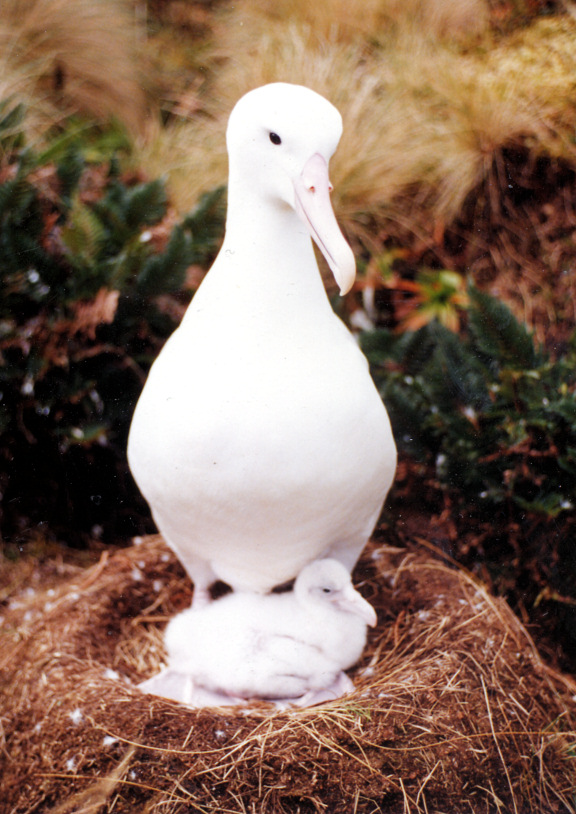
Southern royal albatross, Diomedea epomophora with chick on mound nest on Campbell Island

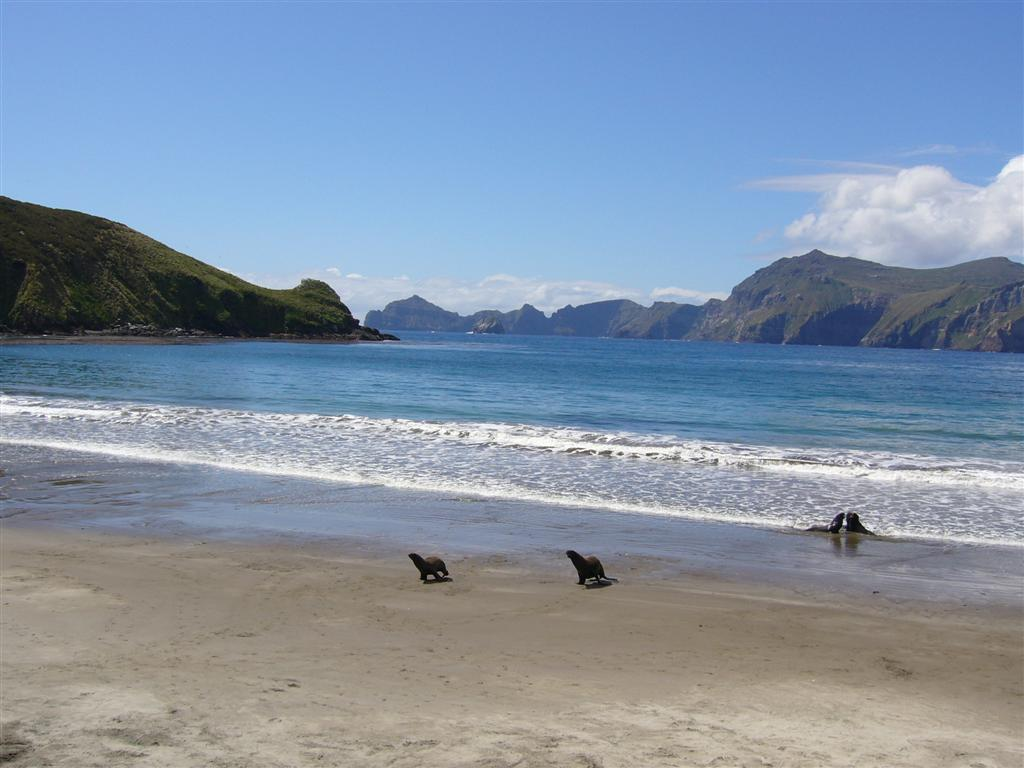
Sea lions playing at Northwest Bay

== See also ==
- Megaherbs
- Campbell teal
- Campbell Island group
- New Zealand subantarctic islands
- List of Antarctic and subantarctic islands
- List of islands
- Desert island
- Rat Island, where rats have also been eradicated
