= Sub-Antarctic Islands Scientific Expedition =

New Zealand scientific expedition

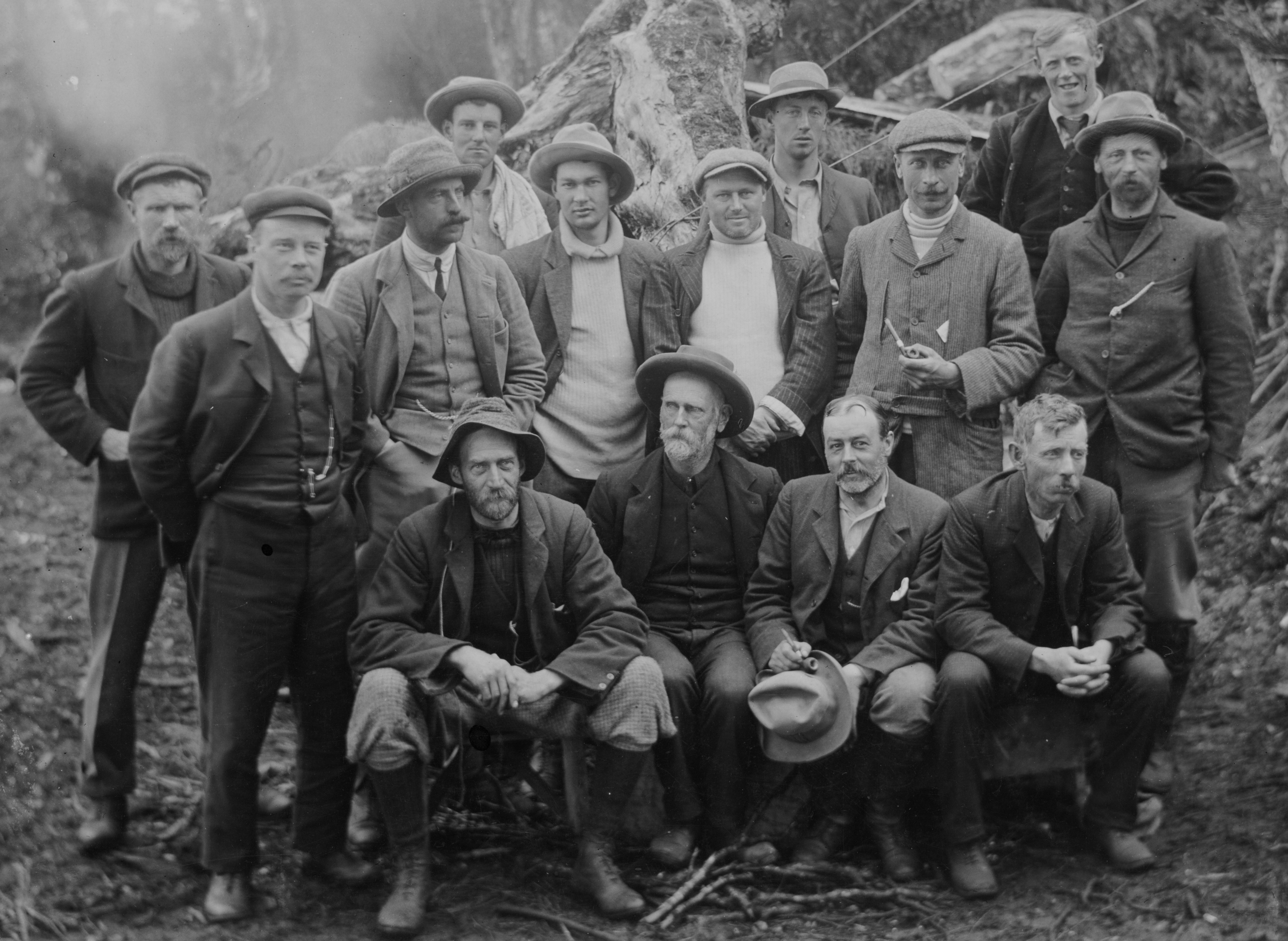
Auckland Islands scientific personnel

The Sub-Antarctic Islands Scientific Expedition of 1907 was organised by the Philosophical Institute of Canterbury. The main aim of the expedition was to extend the magnetic survey of New Zealand by investigating Campbell Island and the Auckland Islands, but botanical, biological and zoological surveys were also conducted.

== Preparations ==
The planning committee of the Philosophical Institute of Canterbury approached the various branches of the New Zealand Institute for support and armed with this, approached the New Zealand Minister in Charge of Marine Department, John A. Millar, for possible transport. On being informed that neither of the New Zealand Government steam ships would be available, the committee sent a delegation to the Acting Premier, William Hall-Jones.

By 8 June 1907, it was confirmed that NZGSS Hinemoa under the captaincy of John Bollons would be available to transport the expedition.

=== Personnel ===
A group of 26 participants went on the expedition. Although Thomas Kirk requested that the expedition include a ‘distinguished lady botanist’, the Council of the Philosophical Institute of Canterbury ‘could not see its way clear to take a lady’, and all 26 participants were men.

The group was split into two main parties—one for Campbell Island and one for the Auckland Islands—with the intention that the groups were to be dropped off to survey while NZGSS Hinemoa conducted its regular round of checking the castaway depots at other subantarctic islands before returning to pick the groups up.

Botany survey

- Leonard Cockayne
- Bernard Aston
- John Smaillie Tennant
- Arthur Dorrien-Smith
- Robert M. Laing
- Joseph Crosby-Smith

Geology survey

- Robert Speight
- Alexander Moncrief Finlayson
- G. S. Collyns
- Patrick Marshall
- Robert Browne

Magnetic survey

- Coleridge Farr
- Henry Denman Cook
- Henry Fawsit Skey
- Edward Kidson
- C. A'Court Opie

Zoology survey

- William Benham
- George Hudson
- Edgar Ravenswood Waite
- Charles Chilton
- George Marriner
- James Boxer Mayne
- Harry Borrer Kirk

== Expedition ==
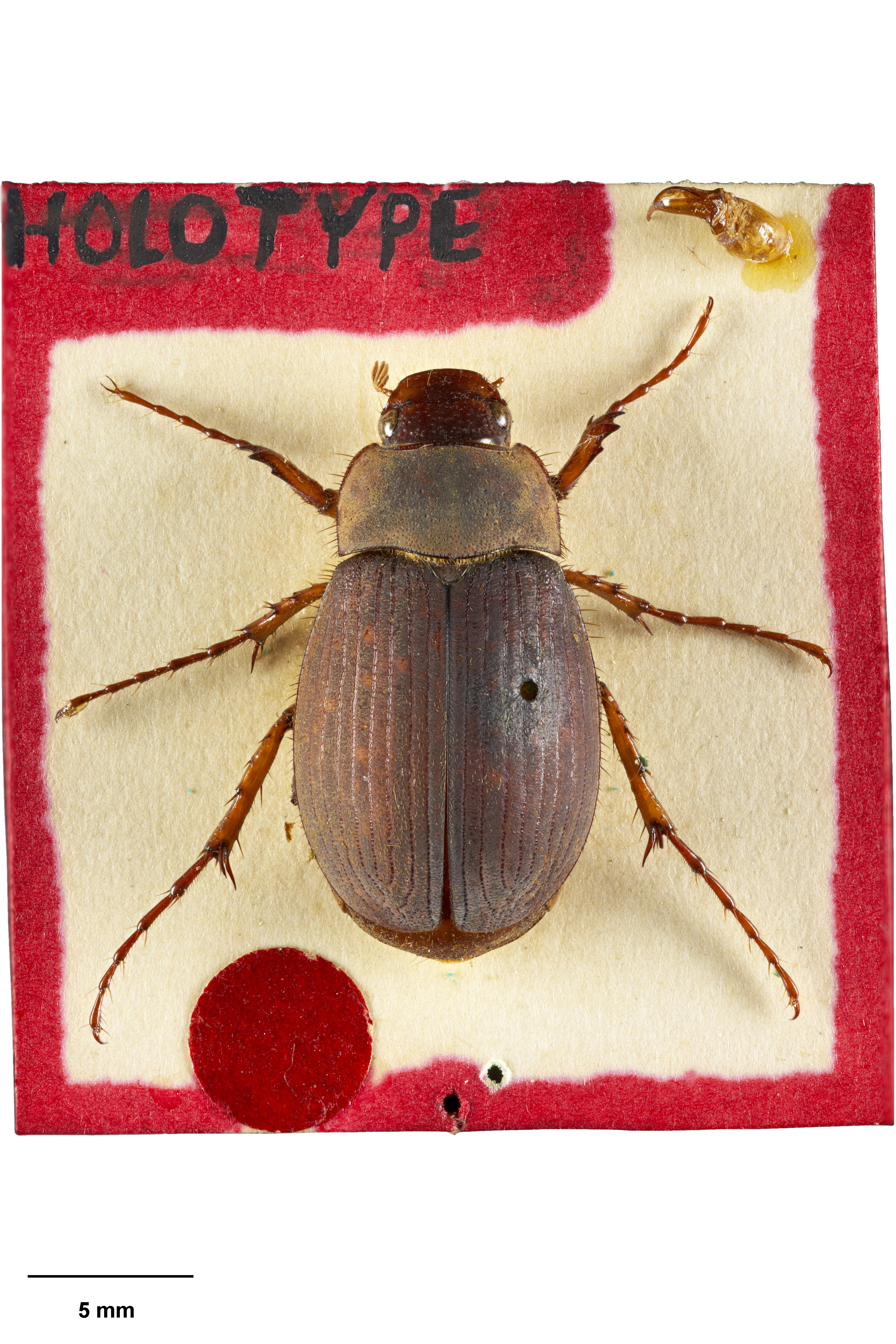
Beetle (Prodontria longitarsis) collected at the Snares on 15 November 1907

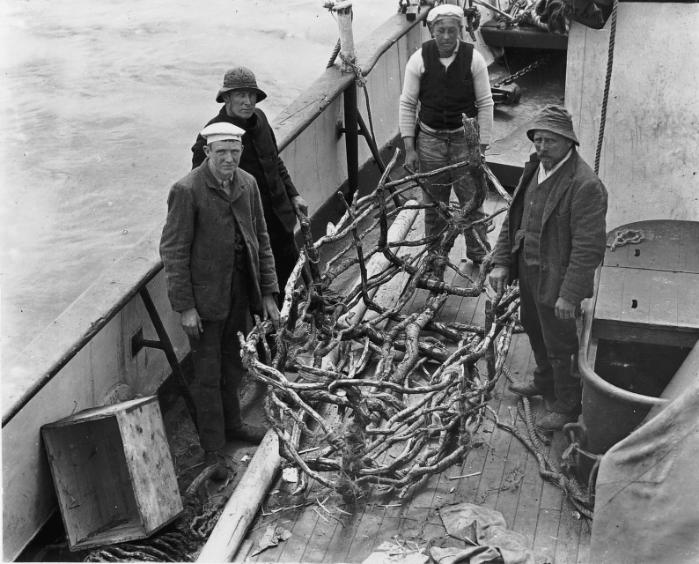
Survivors of the Dundonald shipwreck on board Hinemoa with their coracle frame

NZGSS Hinemoa departed from Bluff on 14 November 1907, and the expedition arrived at Port Pegasus on Stewart Island in the early afternoon. Some disembarked for an episode of botanical collecting. The voyage continued at 21:00 that evening with an overnight steam to the Snares Islands, which were reached at 06:00. All of 15 November was spent at The Snares exploring the islands and collecting soil, rock, zoological and botanical specimens.

By 16 November, the expedition arrived at Auckland Islands and discovered the castaways of the wreck of the Dundonald. After ensuring that the castaways were supplied with provisions and taking on board one of the castaways to act as a cook for the Campbell Island expedition group, the Auckland Islands expedition party was dropped off at Camp Cove.

Campbell Island was reached on 18 November, and the remainder of the expedition was dropped off. Hinemoa returned and picked up the Campbell Island group on 25 November. While Hinemoa was away, the Auckland Islands group, who had also been supplied with a whaleboat and crew, were rowed to various locations around Auckland Islands during their ten-day stay. With the return of the Hinemoa on 26 November, the Auckland Islands group packed up and boarded the vessel.

On 27 November, the ship steamed to Enderby Island for further exploration and specimen hunting, before moving on to Disappointment Island on 28 November. A number of expedition members collected specimens and samples while Captain Bollons organised the exhumation of the Dundonald's chief mate, Jabez Peters, for reburial at Hardwicke cemetery. The funeral was held that evening. Hinemoa arrived back in Bluff on 30 November.

== Sources ==
Bibliography

- Chilton, C. (1909). The Subantarctic Islands of New Zealand. Wellington: Mackay. OCLC 1017266830.
- Godley, E. J. (1979). "The 1907 Expedition to the Auckland and Campbell Islands". Tuatara. 23 (3). Victoria University of Wellington. OCLC 770417548.

Newspapers

- "Science at the Islands". The Star. Christchurch. 6 November 1907.
- "The Dundonald Wreck". The Star. Christchurch. 2 December 1907.
- "Sub-Antarctic Exploration". The Evening Post. Wellington. 9 December 1907.
