= Anjou (ship) =

Coordinates: 50.777075°S 165.887516°E

History
- Name: Anjou
- Completed: 1899
- Fate: Wrecked in the Auckland Islands in 1905

General characteristics
- Type: Barque
- Tonnage: 1,642 GRT

Anjou was a 1,642 gross register tons (GRT), French steel barque built in 1899. It was wrecked in the Auckland Islands in 1905.

== Wreck ==
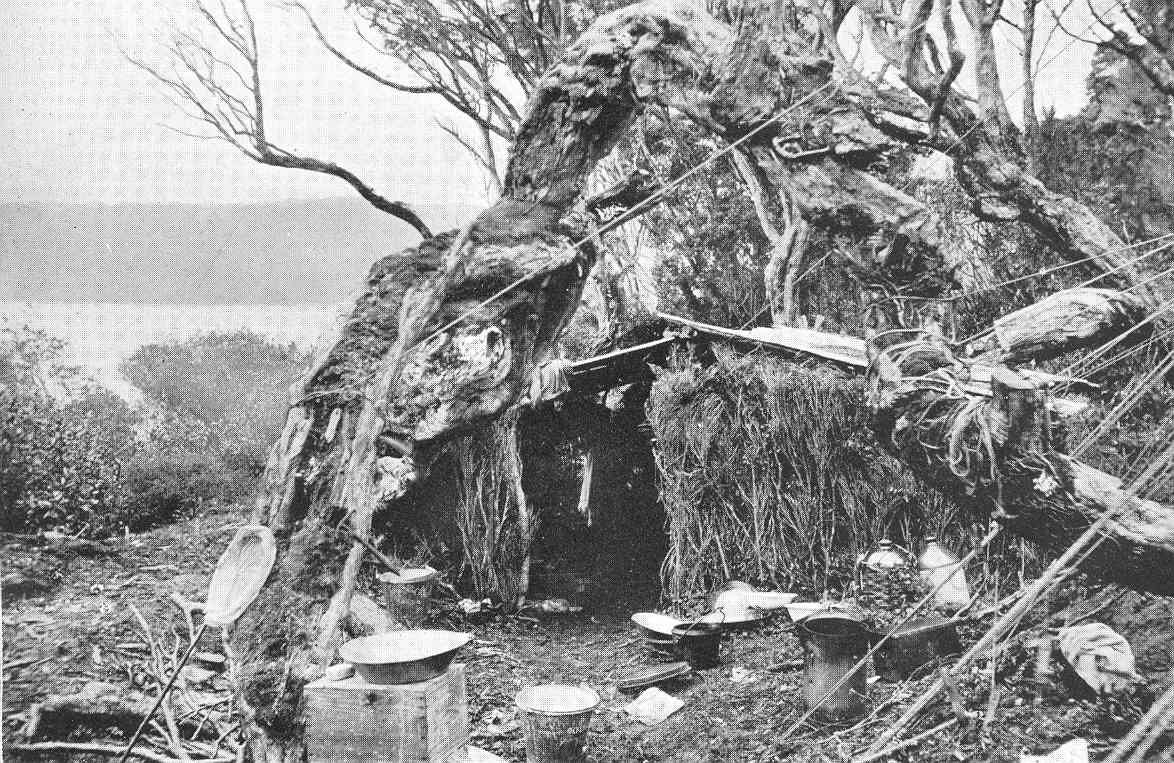
A hut made by the stranded crew

Anjou was sailing from Sydney to Falmouth with a cargo of wheat. In foggy weather at 8.30 p.m. on 5 February 1905, it struck rocks at Bristow Point, Auckland Island. The ship listed to port and the seas began breaking over her. An attempt was made to launch the boats but when the first boat was destroyed Captain Le Tallec halted the launch and ordered the crew to stay on board overnight. At 6 a.m. the next morning another attempt to abandon ship was made and all three remaining boats made it safely to shore with no loss of life from the crew of 22.

On 7 February, a signpost to the boat shed was discovered and the castaways went to Camp Cove. The crew took shelter in the boat shed and hunted seals, birds and shellfish for food. It wasn't until the tenth day that they discovered the castaway depot and a notice that the depot received regular visits from the New Zealand Government steam ships. The crew built additional huts of scrub and tussock and waited for rescue. Fearing that supplies of food would run short they continued to supplement their diet with local wildlife and also sought out the other depot on the Islands.

On 7 May, Captain John Bollons anchored Hinemoa in Camp Cove and rescued the castaways. He restocked the castaway depots and returned to New Zealand with the crew of Anjou via Campbell Island as was his normal route. Unlike other shipwrecks on the Auckland Islands the survivors had only a short stay of a little over three months before being rescued. Other castaways, such as those from Grafton, General Grant, and Dundonald, had significantly longer stays and suffered much hardship and loss of life.

== Wreck discovery and artifacts ==
The exact location of the wreck of Anjou was found as a result of repeated attempts to find the wreck of General Grant during the 1970s and 1980s. General Grant is rumoured to have been carrying a significant quantity of gold from the Australian gold fields when it was wrecked on the island in 1864. The exact location of the wreck of General Grant has never been confirmed although there have been numerous searches.

In 1975, the search team led by John Gratton found the wreck of Anjou but although the divers recovered several artifacts none could confirm the wreck's identity. Gratton and his team returned to the site in 1976 and another team visited in 1977 but it was not until 1986 when a syndicate of divers were able to prove that the site was the wreck of Anjou. A number of artifacts from the wreck are in the collection of the Museum of New Zealand Te Papa Tongarewa.
