= Cape Brett Lighthouse =

Lighthouse in New Zealand

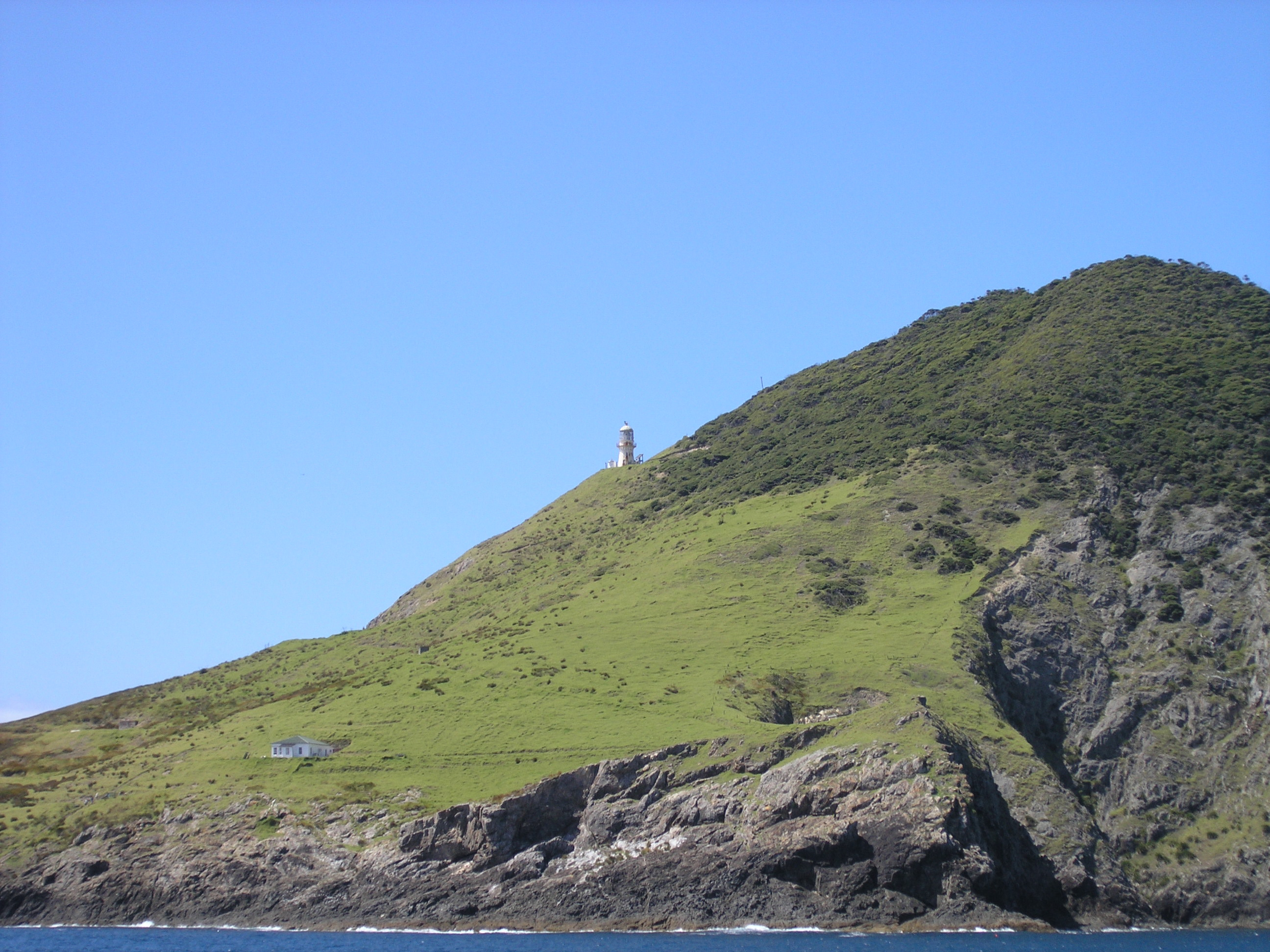
- Location: Cape Brett; North Island; New Zealand
- Coordinates: 35°10′31″S 174°19′57″E

Tower
- Constructed: 1910 (first)
- Construction: cast iron tower (first) fibreglass tower (current)
- Automated: 1978
- Height: approx. 15 metres (49 ft) (first); 4 metres (13 ft) (current)
- Shape: cylindrical tower with lantern
- Markings: white tower
- Operator: Department of Conservation

Light
- First lit: 1978 (current)
- Deactivated: 1978 (first)
- Focal height: 146 metres (479 ft)
- Range: 17 nmi (31 km; 20 mi)
- Characteristic: Fl W 15s. (current)

Heritage New Zealand – Category 1
- Designated: 26 June 2009
- Reference no.: 7799

Cape Brett Lighthouse is a lighthouse at Cape Brett in the Northland Region of the North Island of New Zealand.

The site was surveyed and chosen in 1908 by Captain John Bollons of NZGSS Hinemoa. Cape Brett Lighthouse was designed by the Marine Department's lighthouse artificer David Scott and built in 1908–1909. The lighthouse tower is constructed of cast iron plates bolted together, manufactured by Charles Judd's Thames Iron Works foundry in Thames. Judd also built other iron lighthouses installed at East Cape and elsewhere. The lantern was built in Edinburgh, and other components came from Birmingham and Edinburgh. The lighthouse was manned by three keepers.

The light at Cape Brett was turned on for the first time on 21 February 1910. Cape Brett had a first order Fresnel lens which could be seen from 49 kilometres out to sea. It was the last of New Zealand's nine first order lighthouses to be installed. Cape Brett Lighthouse was the first lighthouse in New Zealand to use a mercury bath for revolving the light. Previously, revolving lights moved on wheels or ball bearings on a circular track. The weight of the light and mechanism limited the speed at which the light could revolve. By floating the light on mercury instead of using wheels, the Cape Brett light could revolve faster, giving a faster flash, and the light on top could be heavier. Since less pressure was needed to set the light in motion, a smaller motor could be used.

The lighthouse was initially powered by kerosene, but in 1955 was converted to diesel-generated electricity. In 1967 it was linked to the national grid. In the 1970s, the Marine Department began automating lighthouses. The resident lighthouse keeper left and the light was decommissioned and replaced by an automatic beacon. The light last shone on 5 October 1978.

The Department of Conservation now manages the lighthouse site as part of the Manawahuna Scenic Reserve. Visitors can stay in the lighthouse keeper's cottage which is now a DOC hut.

Cape Brett Lighthouse and its associated structures are on the Heritage New Zealand list as a Category 1 Historic Place List No: 7799. It was registered on 26 June 2009.

The lighthouse featured on postage stamps issued in 1947 and 2009.

== See also ==
- List of lighthouses in New Zealand
