= John Bollons =

New Zealand marine captain (1862–1929)

John Bollons ISO
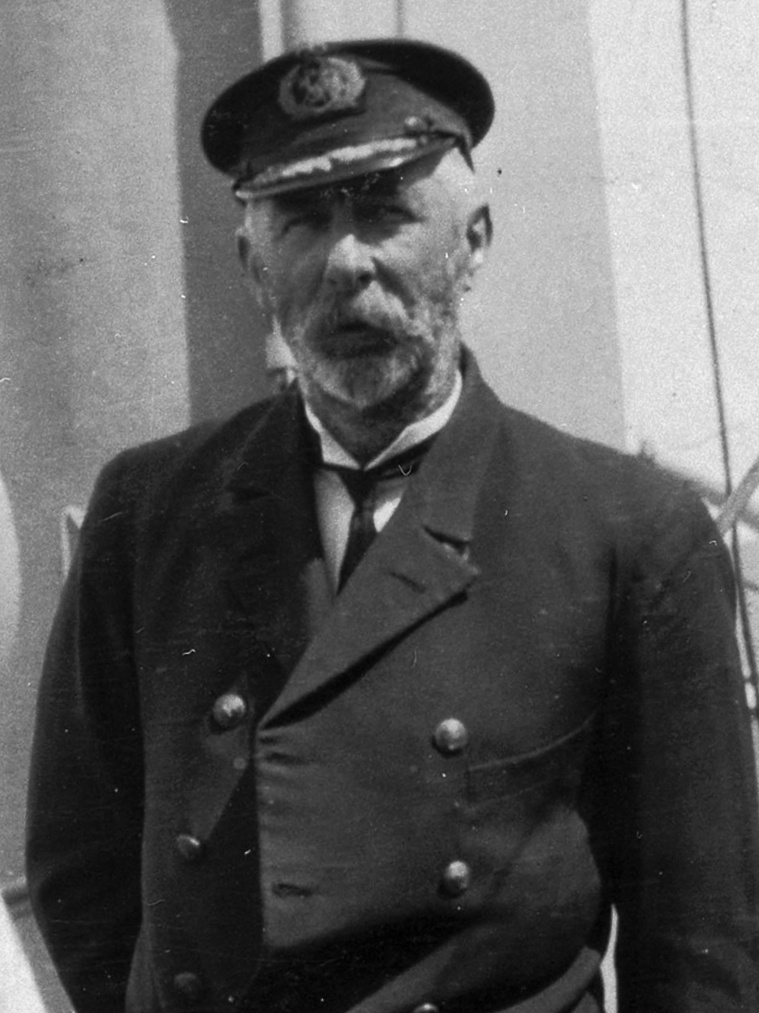
- Bollons in November 1923
- Born: John Peter Bollons; 10 November 1862; Bethnal Green, England
- Died: 18 September 1929 (aged 66); Wellington, New Zealand

John Peter Bollons ISO (10 November 1862 – 18 September 1929) was a New Zealand marine captain, naturalist and ethnographer. For many years he captained New Zealand government steamers, including the NZGSS Hinemoa, which undertook lighthouse work and patrols through New Zealand's subantarctic islands. Bollons Island, in the Antipodes Islands, is named after him. In 1928 he was appointed a Companion of the Imperial Service Order.

== Early life ==
Bollons was born 10 November 1862 in Bethnal Green, England, the son of a London cab master. At 19, Bollons joined the crew of the barque England's Glory. After an eventful trip from the West Indies, the ship was wrecked at Bluff in 1881, with no loss of life. Bollons and another young crew member were taken in by one of the local Māori families.

== Marine career ==
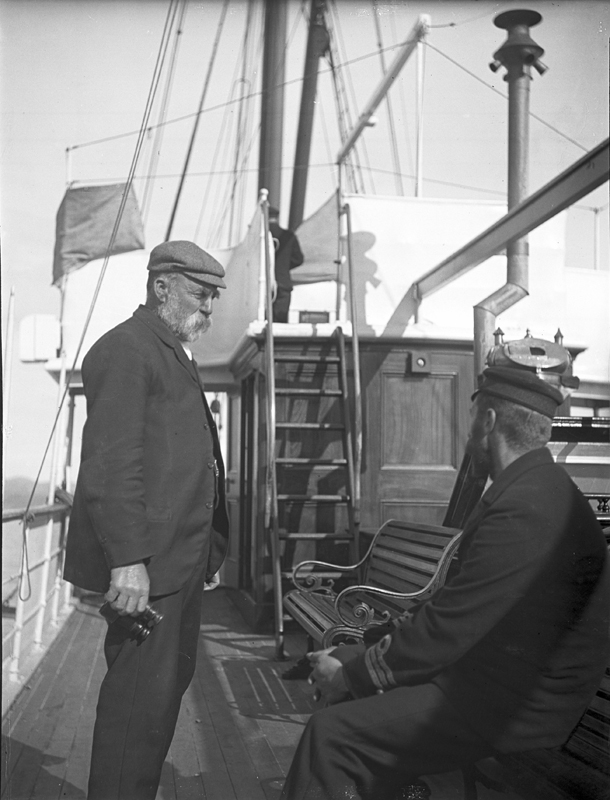
Captain Bollons (left) aboard the NZGSS Hinemoa in 1902

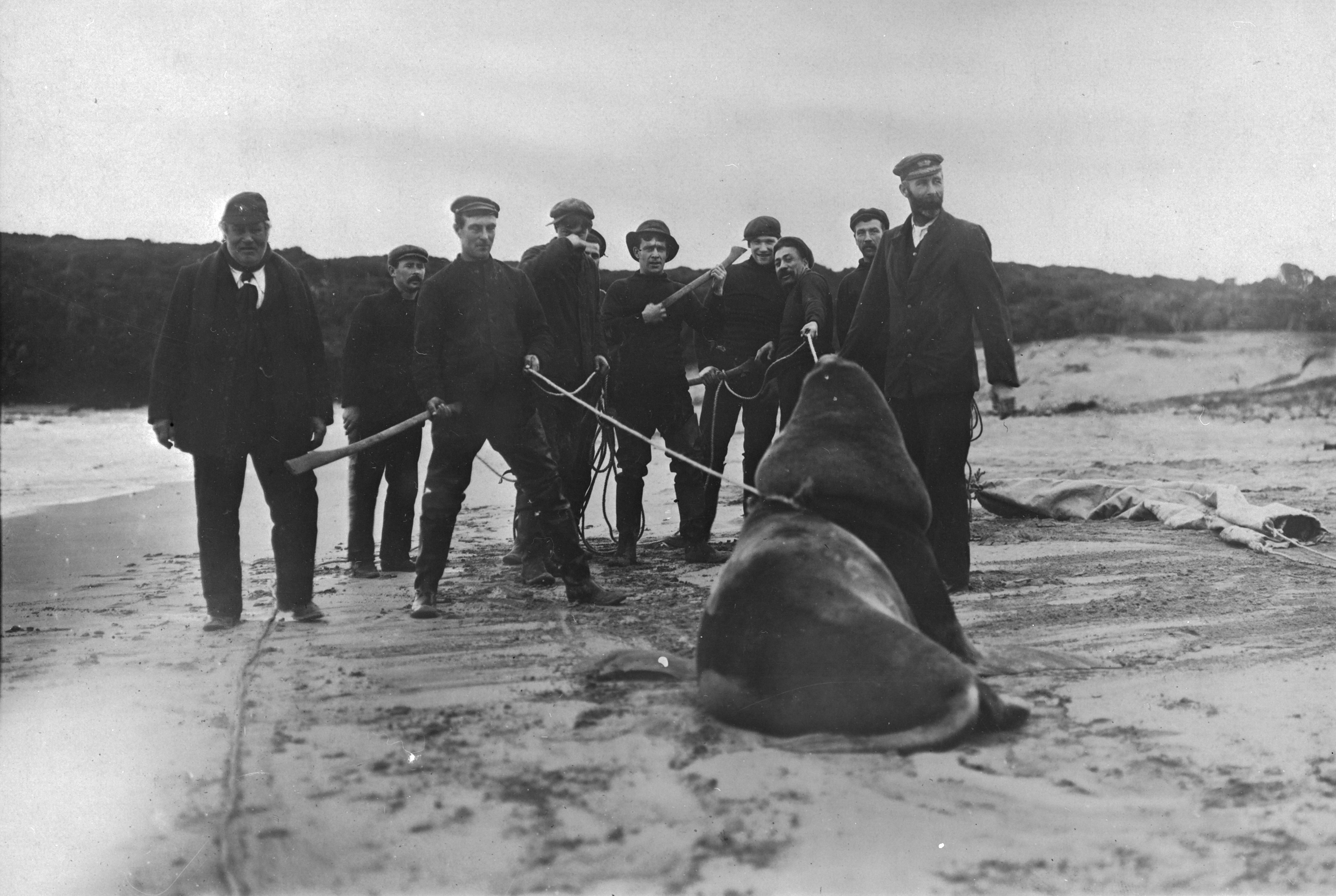
Captain Bollons and crew capturing a sea lion, 1909

Bollons went to sea at the age of 19, joining a barquentine en route to the West Indies. In 1881, his ship England's Glory ran aground in Bluff; he settled in the town, working for a pilot cutter before gaining work on the government ketch Kekeno. From then until 1892 he served aboard a number of local and merchant vessels before gaining his master's certificate, after which he worked on Marine Department steamers. In 1898 he became captain of the Government Service Steamer Hinemoa.

The government steamers had various duties throughout New Zealand's waters, including supplying and supporting lighthouses, charting the coasts, patrolling and replenishing castaway depots in the subantantarctic islands – as well as searching for lost vessels – and carrying scientific and navigational parties. As part of these duties, he rescued castaways from the Anjou on Auckland Island, 1905, and the Dundonald on Disappointment Island in 1907.

In 1908, Bollons surveyed and selected the site for the Cape Brett Lighthouse.

== Natural history and ethnography interests ==
Bollons had a great interest in natural history, collecting various specimens on his journeys. He corresponded regularly with natural environment scientists and sometimes collected specimens for them. The rescue of the castaways of the Dundonald coincided with the 1907 Sub-Antarctic Islands Scientific Expedition whose participants were travelling on the Hinemoa. He was very well regarded by the members of the Expedition as he regularly pointed out and ensured they visited areas he was familiar with and thought might interest them. One of the participants of the expedition—botanist Leonard Cockayne—later named a plant, the Veronica bollonsii, after Bollons. In 1946, Bollons' widow donated an album of photographs to the Alexander Turnbull Library; the album comprised photographs taken by Samuel Page on the 1907 scientific expedition by the Hinemoa to the subantarctic islands, and had been given to Captain Bollons by the members of the expedition.

Bollons was also highly interested in Māori culture, especially fishing traditions. He often used his voyages around the New Zealand coastline and islands to conduct fossicking trips. He spoke Te Reo and the love of this language was reflected in the fact that all of his children had Māori middle names. He collected a large number of Māori and Pacific artifacts and natural environment specimens. The Bollons Collection was purchased by the Dominion Museum. from his widow in 1931. The museum also holds collections of shells, birds and also a valuable collection of New Zealand bird eggs collected by Bollons.

Bollons' reputation as an amateur ornithologist was widespread, and he donated a number of eggs to the American Museum of Vertebrate Zoology in 1923, and provided significant information on the breeding practices of albatrosses.

== Recognition and presence in fiction ==
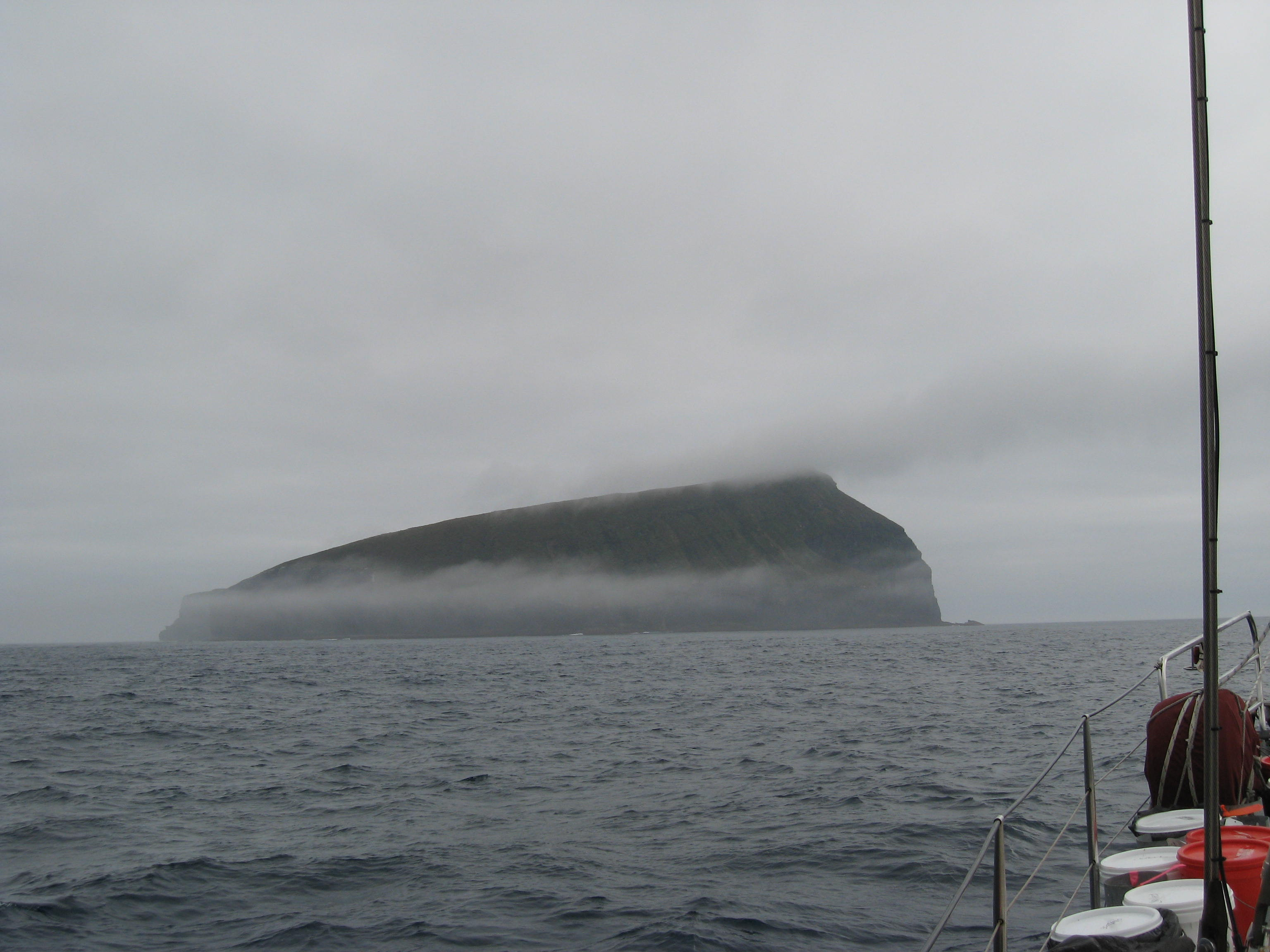
Bollons Island, Antipodes Islands

In the 1928 King's Birthday Honours, Bollons was appointed a Companion of the Imperial Service Order; the award was given on retirement to administrative and clerical staff of the Civil Service throughout the British Empire for long and meritorious service. Bollons Island, in the Antipodes Islands, is named after him.

Bollons was the subject of Captain John Niven, a fictionalised biography by Bernard Fergusson, who lived in New Zealand for a time when his father served as Governor-General.

== Personal life ==
He married Lilian Rose Hunter, the daughter of a master mariner, in 1896 in Invercargill, and in 1911, the family moved to Wellington. They had four daughters and four sons: Thomas Tangaroa (b. 1896), John Tutanekai (b. 1897, Alan Awarua (b. 1900), Liliian Hinemoa (b. 1903), Desmond Maui (b. 1905), Kathleen Rawhiti (b. 1908), Patricia Maimoa (b. 1909), and Nancy Awatea (b. 1914). Bollons died in Wellington after developing pneumonia following hernia surgery on 18 September 1929. He is buried at Bluff, and a memorial was erected in All Saints' Church, Kilbirnie, which was unveiled by Governor General Sir Charles Fergusson.

== See also ==
- List of natural history dealers
