= George Hudson (entomologist) =

English-born New Zealand entomologist (1867–1946)

George Vernon Hudson FRSNZ
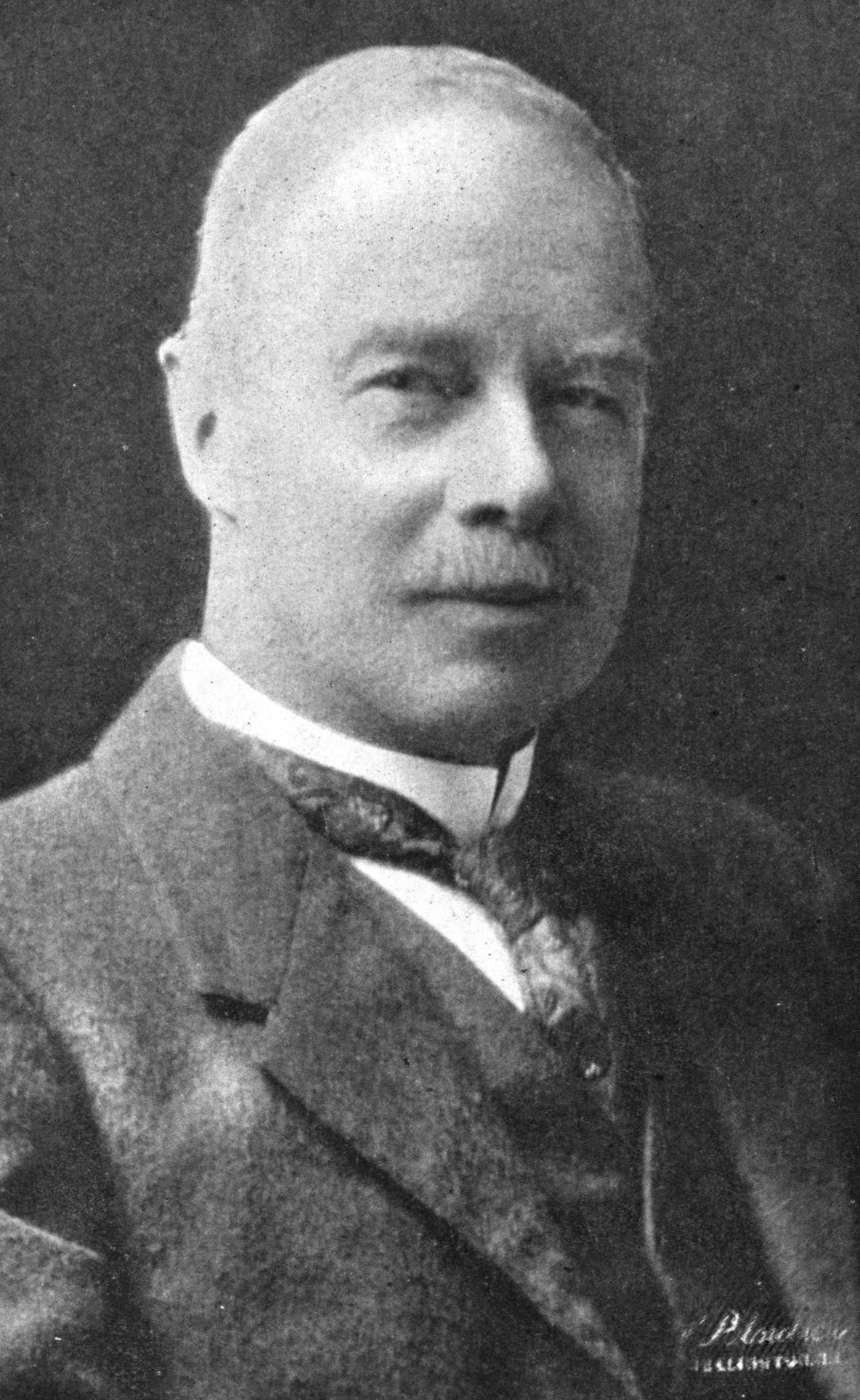
- Hudson c. 1920
- Born: George Vernon Hudson; 20 April 1867; London, England
- Died: 5 April 1946 (aged 78); Karori, Wellington, New Zealand
- Relatives: Dr James Hudson (brother); Sir William Hudson (nephew)
- Awards: Fellow of the Royal Society of New Zealand (Original) (1919), Hector Medal (1923), Hutton Medal (1929), T.K Sidey Medal (1933)
- Scientific career
- Fields: Entomologist; Biologist

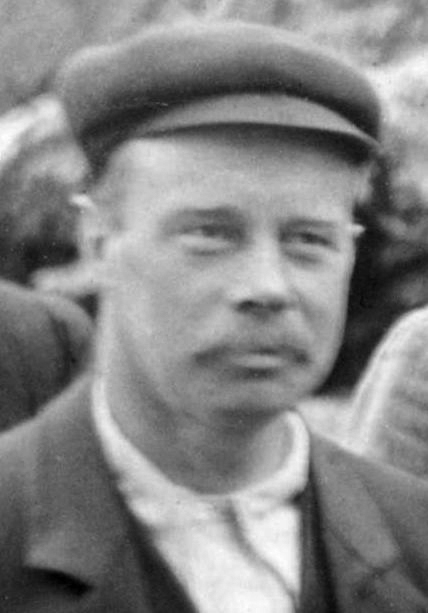
Hudson in 1907, as a member of the Auckland Islands party of the Sub Antarctic Expedition

George Vernon Hudson FRSNZ (20 April 1867 – 5 April 1946) was a New Zealand entomologist credited with proposing the modern daylight saving time. He was awarded the Hector Memorial Medal in 1923.

== Biography ==
Born in London, England, on Easter Saturday, 1867 Hudson was the sixth child of Emily Jane Carnal and Charles Hudson, an artist and stained-glass window designer. By the age of 14 he had built up a collection of British insects, and had published a paper in The Entomologist. In 1881 Hudson moved with his father to Nelson, New Zealand. He worked on a farm, and in 1883, aged 16, he began working at the post office in Wellington, where he eventually became chief clerk, retiring in 1918.

Hudson was a member of the 1907 Sub-Antarctic Islands Scientific Expedition. Its main aim was to extend the magnetic survey of New Zealand by investigating the Auckland and Campbell islands but botanical, biological, and zoological surveys were also conducted. The expedition also rescued castaways from the Dundonald, which had been shipwrecked in the Auckland Islands.

Hudson is credited with proposing modern-day daylight saving time. His shift-work job gave him leisure time to collect insects, and led him to value after-hours daylight. In 1895, he presented a paper to the Wellington Philosophical Society proposing a two-hour daylight-saving shift, and after considerable interest was expressed in Christchurch, he followed up in an 1898 paper. In 1933, Hudson was the first recipient (together with Ernest Rutherford) of the T. K. Sidey Medal, set up by the Royal Society of New Zealand from funds collected to commemorate the passing of the Summer-Time Act 1927.

Another Briton, William Willett, championed the use of daylight saving time. It was made law there in 1916.

Hudson's collection of insects, the largest in New Zealand, is housed in the Museum of New Zealand Te Papa Tongarewa. Between 1881 and 1946, Hudson recorded information in three handwritten volumes that described thousands of species, inventing his own coding system. In 2018, Te Papa launched a crowd-sourcing project calling for digital volunteers to help decipher those codes, which will then allow conservation entomologists to compare Hudson's records with the status of those same insects today.

== Honours and awards ==
- 1919 – Original Fellow of the Royal Society of New Zealand
- 1923 – Hector Medal
- 1929 – Hutton Medal
- 1933 – T. K. Sidey Medal (together with Ernest Rutherford)

== Personal life ==
Hudson and his wife, Florence, were parents to one daughter. Florence died in 1935. Hudson died on 5 April 1946 at his home "Hillview" in the Wellington suburb of Karori.

== Works ==
- 1892: An Elementary Manual of New Zealand entomology: Being an introduction to the study of our native insects. London: West, Newman, & Co.
- 1898: New Zealand Moths and Butterflies (Macro-Lepidoptera) London: West, Newman, & Co.
- 1904: New Zealand Neuroptera : a popular introduction to the life-histories and habits of may-flies, dragon-flies, caddis-flies and allied insects inhabiting New Zealand, including notes on their relation to angling. London: West, Newman & Co. 1904.
- 1928: The butterflies and moths of New Zealand. Wellington: Ferguson & Osborn Ltd. 1928.
- 1950: Fragments of New Zealand entomology. – a popular account of all New Zealand cicadas. The natural history of the New Zealand glow-worm. A second supplement to the butterflies and moths of New Zealand and notes on many other native insects. Wellington: Ferguson & Osborn Ltd. 1950.
