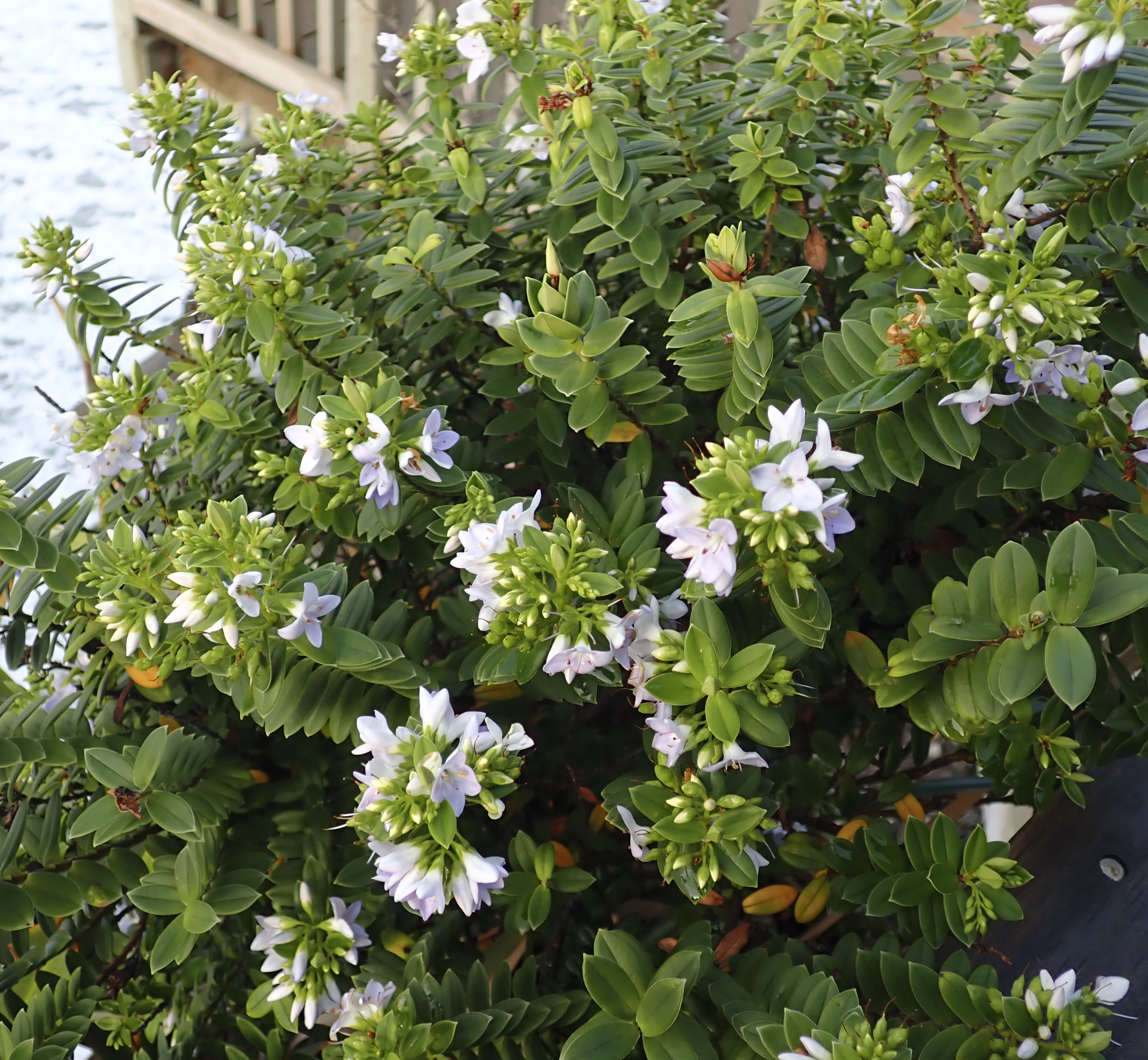
- Te Miko, West Coast, New Zealand

Scientific classification
- Kingdom: Plantae
- Clade: Tracheophytes
- Clade: Angiosperms
- Clade: Eudicots
- Clade: Asterids
- Order: Lamiales
- Family: Plantaginaceae
- Genus: Veronica
- Section: Veronica sect. Hebe
- Species: V. elliptica

Binomial name
- Veronica elliptica G.Forst.

Synonyms
- Hebe elliptica (G.Forst.) Pennell; Hebe magellanica J.F.Gmel.; Hebe menziesii (Benth.) Cockayne & Allan; Veronica decussata Moench; Veronica magellanica Juss. ex Dippel, not validly publ.; Veronica marginata Colenso; Veronica menziesii Benth.; Veronica simpsonii Phil.

= Veronica elliptica =

Species of flowering plant

Veronica elliptica, synonym Hebe elliptica, is a plant of the family Plantaginaceae. It is native to New Zealand (including the Antipodean Islands and the Chatham Islands), Patagonia and the Falkland Islands. It is an evergreen, bushy shrub of 1 m or more in height, with green, oval leaves, 2–4 cm long. Flowers are white to pale mauve.

Branches from plants of Veronica elliptica on Disappointment Island, Auckland Islands, New Zealand were used by the survivors of the shipwreck of the Dundonald to build a coracle and oars which they eventually used to successfully reach Auckland Island.
