= Archway Island (Antipodes Island Group) =

Outlying island of New Zealand

Geography
- Coordinates: 49.638624°S 178.813936°E

Administration
- New Zealand

Demographics
- Population: uninhabited

Archway Island is an outlying island of New Zealand. It is part of the Antipodes Island Group, and lays directly north of Bollons Island.
