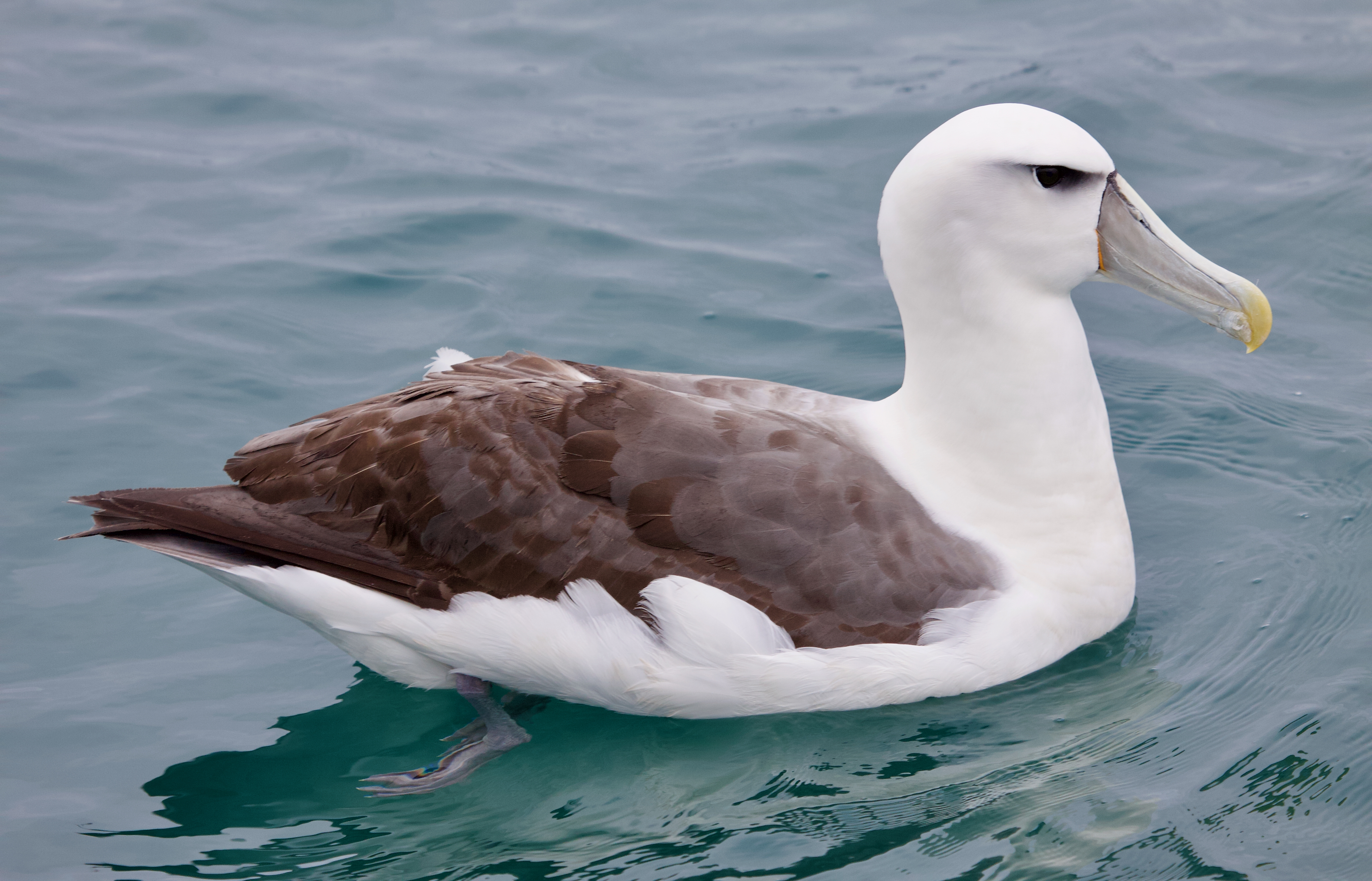

Conservation status
- Near Threatened (IUCN 3.1)

Scientific classification
- Kingdom: Animalia
- Phylum: Chordata
- Class: Aves
- Order: Procellariiformes
- Family: Diomedeidae
- Genus: Thalassarche
- Species: T. cauta
- Subspecies: T. c. steadi

Trinomial name
- Thalassarche cauta steadi (Falla, 1933)

= White-capped albatross =

Subspecies of bird

The white-capped albatross (Thalassarche cauta steadi) is a mollymawk that breeds on the islands off of New Zealand. Not all experts agree that this form should be recognized as a separate species from the shy albatross, Thalassarche cauta. It is a medium-sized black, slate gray, and white albatross and is the largest of the mollymawks.

== Taxonomy ==
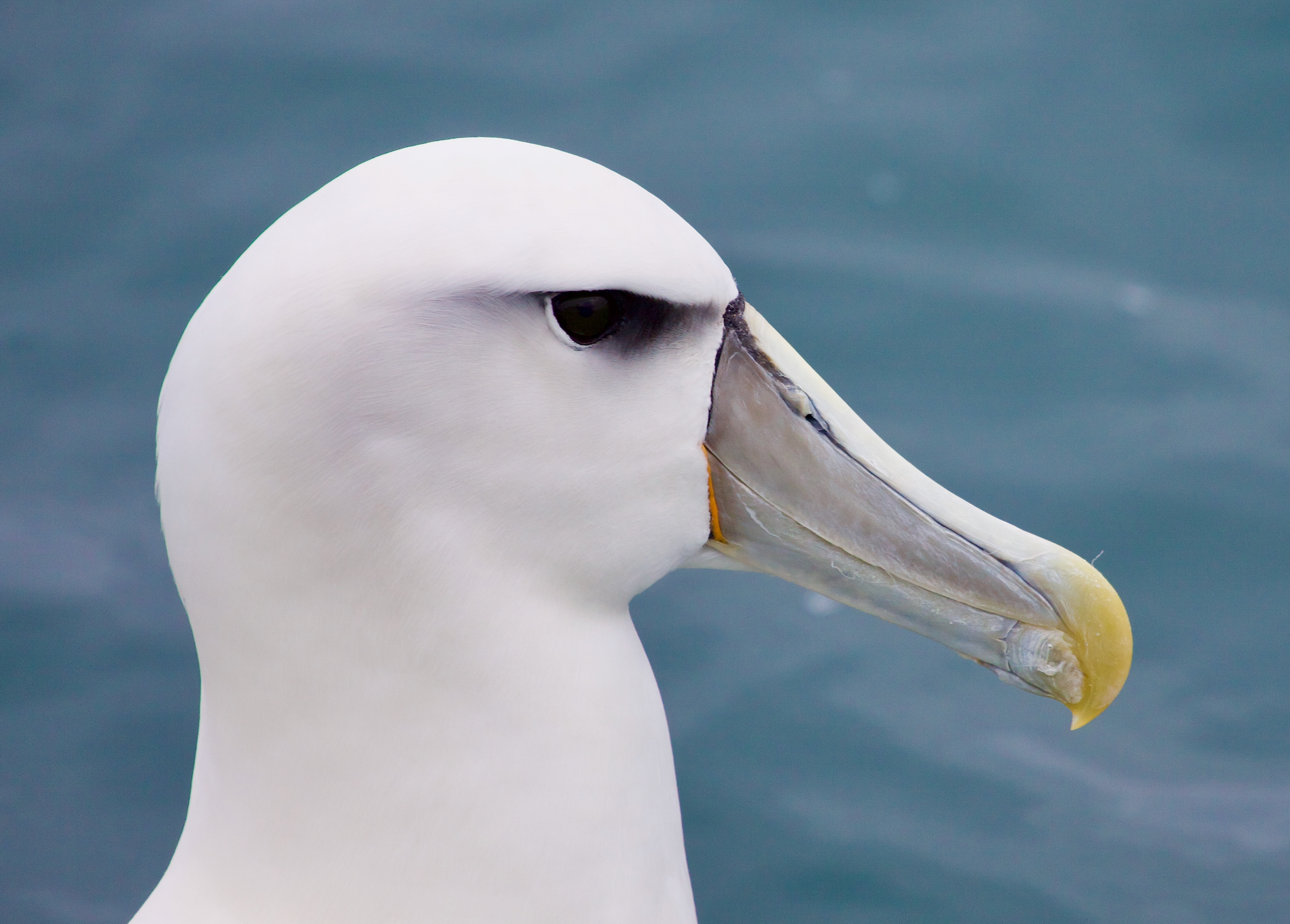
White-capped albatross (Thalassarche cauta steadi)

Mollymawks are a type of albatross that belong to family Diomedeidae of the order Procellariiformes, along with shearwaters, fulmars, storm petrels, and diving petrels. They share certain identifying features. First, they have nasal passages that attach to the upper bill called naricorns. Although the nostrils on the albatross are on the sides of the bill. The bills of Procellariiformes are also unique in that they are split into between seven and nine horny plates. Finally, they produce a stomach oil made up of wax esters and triglycerides that is stored in the proventriculus. This is used against predators as well as an energy rich food source for chicks and for the adults during their long flights. They also have a salt gland that is situated above the nasal passage and helps desalinate their bodies, due to the high amount of ocean water that they imbibe. It excretes a high saline solution from their nose.

The white-capped albatross is part of a greater complex of albatrosses consisting of the shy albatross, Thasassarche cauta, Salvin's albatross, Thalassarche salvini, and Chatham albatross, Thalassarche eremita. In 1998, Robertson and Nunn recommended a four-way split, some experts agreed. BirdLife International agreed in 2007, ACAP agreed in 2006, and Brooke agreed in 2004. The SACC agreed to a three-way split, leaving steadi, the white-capped albatross grouped with the shy albatross. The Clements taxonomy has yet to agree on any of these splits. Finally, following Brooke, this species was shifted from Diomedea to Thalassarche, which was generally agreed upon by most experts.

== Description ==
The white-capped albatross averages 90 to 99 cm (35–39 in) in length, with a wingspan of 220 to 256 cm (87–101 in). It weighs 3.4 to 4.4 kg (7.5–9.7 lb) It has a bold white cap that contrasts with a pale silver gray face and a darker brow. Some adults have a white back with brown tipped feathers. They have a dark gray mantle and a black tail. Most of the rest of the body is white. Its bill is pale gray to blue with a yellow tip. Juveniles have a gray bill with a dark tip, and their head is darker, with gray to the collar.

== Range and habitat ==
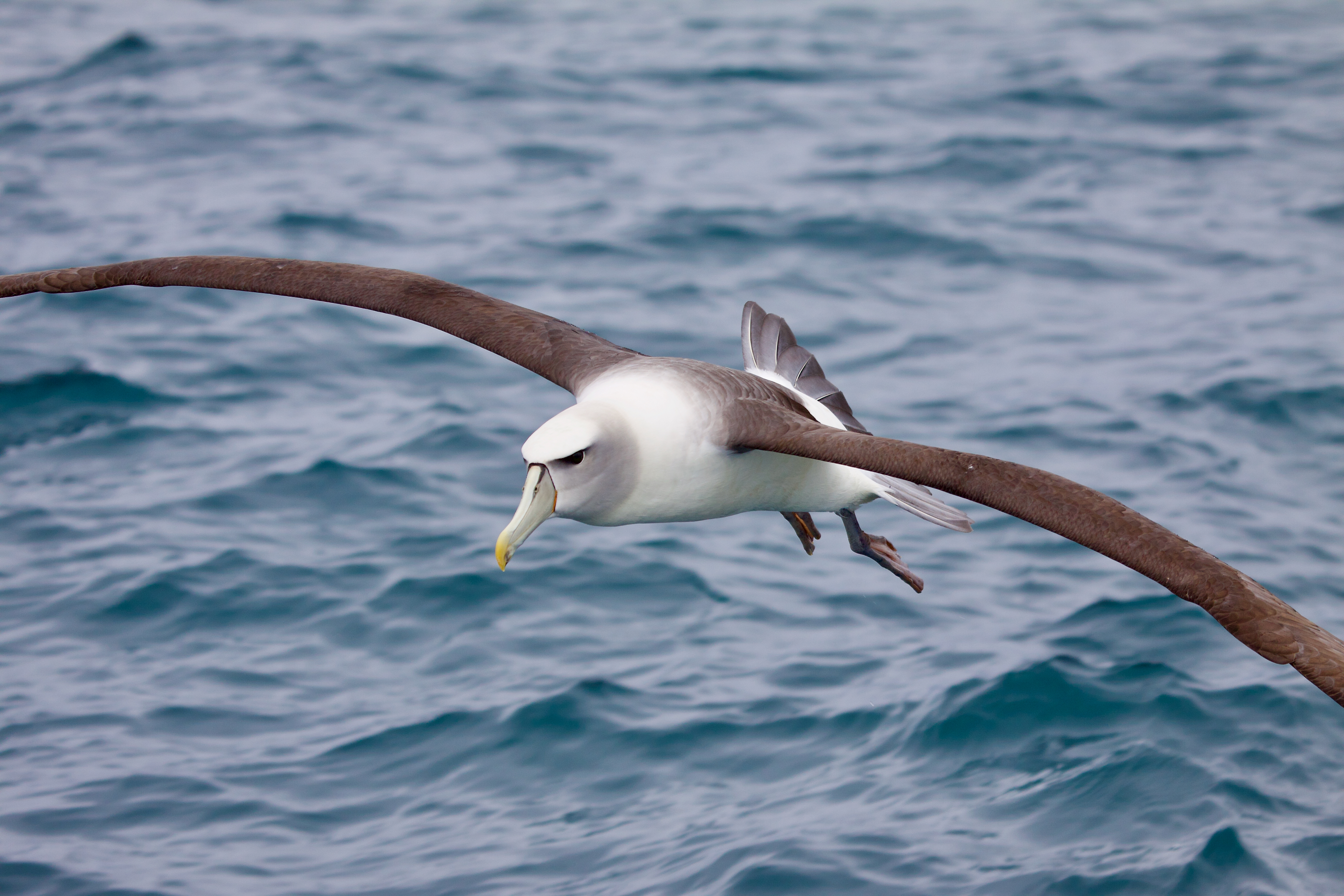
White-capped albatross (Thalassarche cauta steadi)

Breeding population and trends
Location	Population	Date	Trend
Disappointment Island	72,000 pairs	1993	
Auckland Island	3,000 pairs		
Antipodes Island	50—100 pairs	1994	
Adams Island	100 pairs		
Total	150,000	1993	Stable

They are endemic to the islands off the coast of New Zealand, with a population of 75,000 breeding pairs, estimated in 2007, and 350,000 to 375,000 total birds. Disappointment Island has a massive colony whose sheer numbers comprise the dominant feature of the island, with a mean of 63,856 breeding pairs (when corrected for non-breeders) based on surveys conducted from 2009 to 2017. Auckland Island has 3,000 pairs, Adams Island (Auckland Islands) has 100 pairs, and Bollons Island (Antipodes Islands) has 100 pairs.

Juvenile and non-breeding birds are believed to forage in the southwestern Atlantic and a recent DNA test of a South Georgia bird confirmed it. Also, using different techniques, scientists have proven that they forage off the coast of southwestern Africa. Juveniles are also believed to go as far as the south Atlantic and the southwestern Indian Ocean. On June 19, 2024, an article recounting field studies of wild albatrosses in the Diego Ramírez Islands of Chile revealed the existence of a small breeding population of White-capped albatross.

== Behavior ==
=== Feeding ===
They are a surface feeder, but may utilize shallow dives for their food which is fish, cephalopods, tunicates, and crustacea.

=== Reproduction ===
The white-capped albatross breeds annually on rocks on small islands.

== Conservation ==
The IUCN classifies this species as near threatened, with an occurrence range of 77,700,000 km^{2} (30,000,000 sq mi) and a breeding range of 22 km^{2} (8.5 sq mi). The largest threat for this bird is longline and trawl fisheries. Net monitor cables were responsible for large numbers of deaths; however, they were phased out in 1992. Commercial exploitation of squid in Bass Strait may present a threat by reducing the food supply. Also, pigs on Auckland Island reduced nesting from 1972 to 1982, and feral cats also take small number of chicks.

Since 2006, Auckland Island birds have been tracked, and this will continue.
