= Antipodes Islands =

Subantarctic archipelago of New Zealand

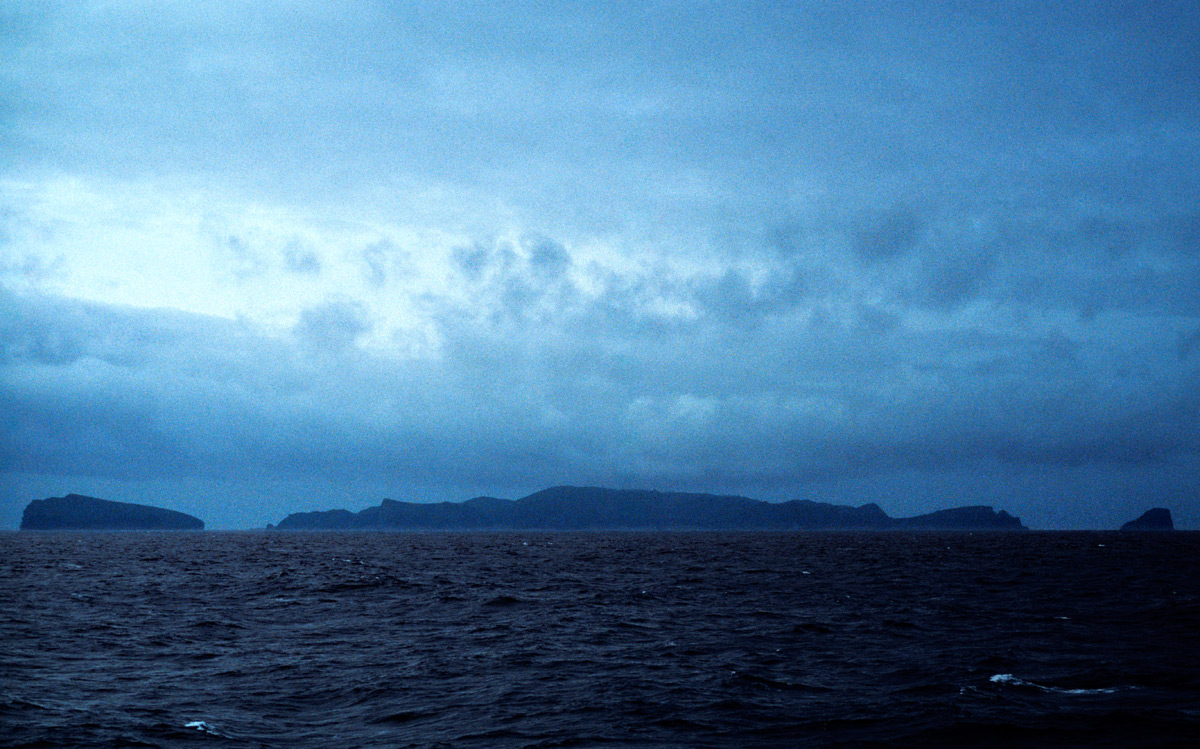
- The Antipodes Islands seen from the north

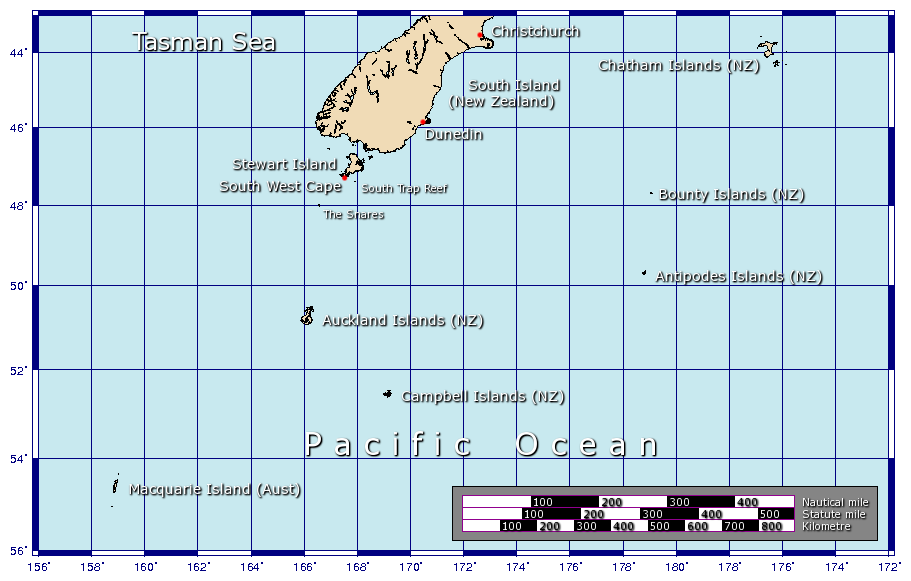
- Position relative to New Zealand and other outlying islands

Geography
- Location: 860 km southeast of Stewart Island
- Coordinates: 49°40′48″S 178°46′48″E
- Archipelago: Antipodes Islands
- Major islands: Antipodes, Bollons
- Area: 21 km^{2} (8.1 sq mi)
- Highest elevation: 366 m (1201 ft)
- Highest point: Mount Galloway

Administration
- New Zealand

Demographics
- Population: 0 (2006)

Additional information
- Nature reserve

The Antipodes Islands (Māori: Moutere Mahue, lit. 'Abandoned Island') are inhospitable and uninhabited volcanic islands in subantarctic waters to the south of – and territorially part of – New Zealand. The 21 km^{2} (8.1 sq mi) archipelago lies 860 km (530 mi) to the southeast of Stewart Island / Rakiura, and 730 km (450 mi) to the northeast of Campbell Island.

The island group consists of one main island, Antipodes Island, of 20 km^{2} (7.7 sq mi) area, Bollons Island to the north, and numerous small islets and stacks.

The islands are listed with the New Zealand Outlying Islands. The islands are an immediate part of New Zealand, but not part of any region or district, but instead Area Outside Territorial Authority, like all the other outlying islands except the Solander Islands.

Ecologically, the islands are part of the Antipodes Subantarctic Islands tundra ecoregion. The islands are inscribed on the UNESCO World Heritage List, together with other subantarctic New Zealand islands. The island group is a nature reserve. Public access is allowed by permit. They are the southeasternmost point of land in the world outside of Antarctica.

== Name ==
The island group was originally called the Penantipodes meaning 'next to the antipodes', because it lies near to the antipodes of London (located around 51.5°S, 180°W). Over time the name has been shortened to Antipodes. The actual antipodes of the centre of the main island lies just off the north east tip of the Cherbourg Peninsula, Normandy, France, with the antipodal perimeter of the main island grazing the Normandy coast near the village of Gatteville-le-Phare, just north of Barfleur.

== Geography ==
Topographical map

The volcanic Antipodes Islands lie 860 km (530 mi) southeast of Stewart Island / Rakiura. They consist of a main island (Antipodes Island), area 20 km^{2} (7.7 sq mi), surrounded by a series of small offshore islands and rocks. These islands include Bollons Island, at 0.5 km^{2} (0.19 sq mi) the second largest in the group, 1,200 m (3,900 ft) to the northeast of the main island's North Cape, and the nearby smaller Archway Island; Leeward Island, situated just off the centre of the main island's east coast (to which it is connected by a rocky bar at low tide); the two Windward Islands, situated 800 m (2,600 ft) apart, the easternmost of which is 600 m (2,000 ft) to the immediate north of Cave Point, the main island's westernmost point; and the tiny Orde Lees Islet, located close to the main island's northwestern shore. Numerous small islets and stacks further surround the coast of the main island. The island group is located on a raised section of seabed with an area of around 30 by 15 km at the eastern edge of the Zealandia lithospheric block. This raised section is around 1,000 m (3,300 ft) above the average level of the surrounding sea floor.

The islands are steep, and cliffs and rocky reefs line the majority of the coasts. The highest point is Mount Galloway at 366 m (1,201 ft) in the north of the main island, which also forms part of the group's most recently active volcano. Mount Waterhouse, to Galloway's southwest, also reaches over 360 m (1,180 ft). Several other heights on the main island reach above 200 m (660 ft), as does the highest point of Bollons Island. A ridge of peaks, the Reliance Ridge, runs along the main island's south coast. Several small streams run from the slopes of the main island's peaks, with the largest of these being the Dougall Stream, which runs northeast from the eastern slopes of Mount Waterhouse to reach the east coast not far from its closest point to Leeward Island. The Ringdove Stream runs east along the northern flanks of the Reliance Ridge to reach the large, rocky Ringdove Bay in the southeast of the main island. A further prominent stream runs southwest from the northwestern slopes of Mount Waterhouse to reach Stack Bay to the south of the Cave Point Peninsula, and a fourth runs north from the slopes of Mount Galloway, reaching the sea to the west of North Cape, close to Reef Point.

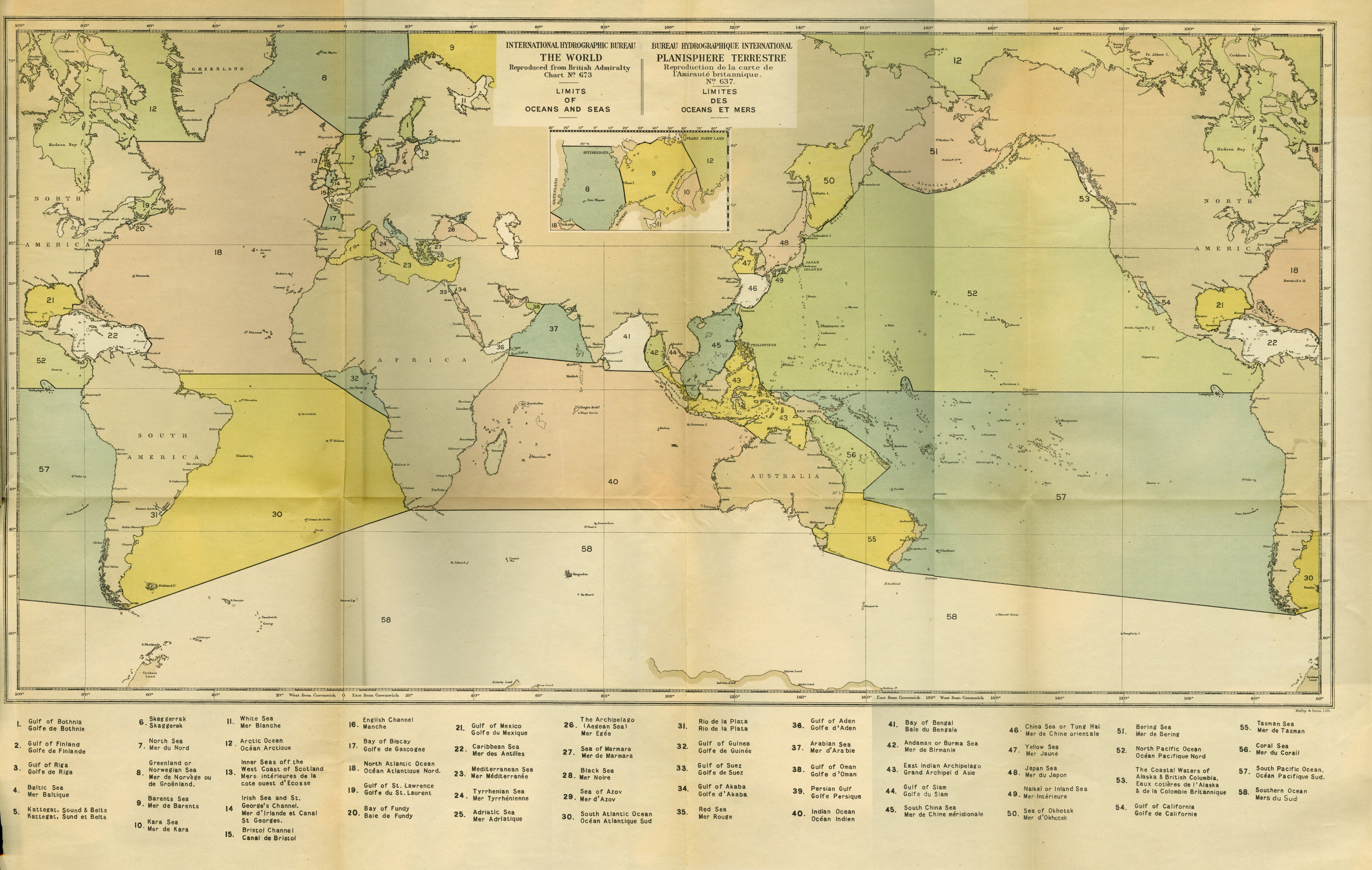
1928 delineation of Southern Ocean including Antipodes Islands

Currently, the Antipodes Islands are considered to be located in the South Pacific. Historically, however, the islands were considered to be in the Southern Ocean, whose boundaries have been redefined on numerous occarions in recent years.

=== Islands ===
The following table includes named islands according to Land Information New Zealand.

Location	Area (ha)
Antipodes Island	2,014.8
Bollons Island	52.6
Leeward Island	12.5
East Windward Island	8.5
West Windward Island	7.0
Archway Island	6.3
Orde Lees Islet	1.8
Total	2,103.7

== History ==
=== Prehistory ===
There is no archaeological evidence of human visitation prior to European discovery of the islands. Descriptions of a shard of early Polynesian pottery having been discovered 76 cm (2 ft 6 in) below the surface on the main island in 1886, and housed in the collections of the Museum of New Zealand Te Papa Tongarewa are unsubstantiated. The museum has not been able to locate such a shard in its collection, and the original reference to the object in the museum's collection documentation indicates no reference to Polynesian influences.

The remoteness of the Antipodes Islands is a likely factor, meaning that they could not have been visited easily; one source described them as "potentially habitable but they are 870 km southeast of the South Island without intervening islands and 700 km south of the Chathams." It also notes that it would have been unlikely that Moriori people would have reached them due to the fact that they only tended to build rafts in their later history.

=== Sealing ===
The island group was seen on 25 March 1800, by Captain Henry Waterhouse commanding HMS Reliance. Matthew Flinders was first lieutenant, and his younger brother Samuel was a midshipman on the vessel; Samuel prepared the chart of the islands. Waterhouse reported the presence of seals. In 1803, Waterhouse's brother-in-law George Bass applied to Governor Philip Gidley King of New South Wales for a fishing monopoly from a line bisecting southern New Zealand from Dusky Sound to the Otago Harbour to cover all the lands and seas to the south, including the Antipodes Islands, probably because he knew the latter were home to large populations of fur seals. Bass sailed from Sydney to the south that year and was never heard of again, but his information led to a sealing boom at the islands in 1805 to 1807. In February 1805, the first sealing gangs arrived on the island from the American schooners Favorite and Independence. They killed about 60,000 seals over the course of the year they were stationed on the islands.

At one time, 80 men were present; there was a battle between American and British-led gangs and a single cargo of more than 80,000 skins—one of the greatest ever shipped from Australasia—was on-sold in Canton for one pound sterling a skin, a multimillion-dollar return in modern terms. Prominent Sydney merchants such as Simeon Lord, Henry Kable and James Underwood were engaged in the trade as well as the Americans Daniel Whitney and Owen Folger Smith. William W. Stewart, who claimed to have charted Stewart Island, and probably William Tucker who started the retail trade in preserved Maori heads, were present during the boom. After 1807, sealing was occasional and cargoes small, no doubt because the animals had been all but exterminated.

=== Shipwrecks ===
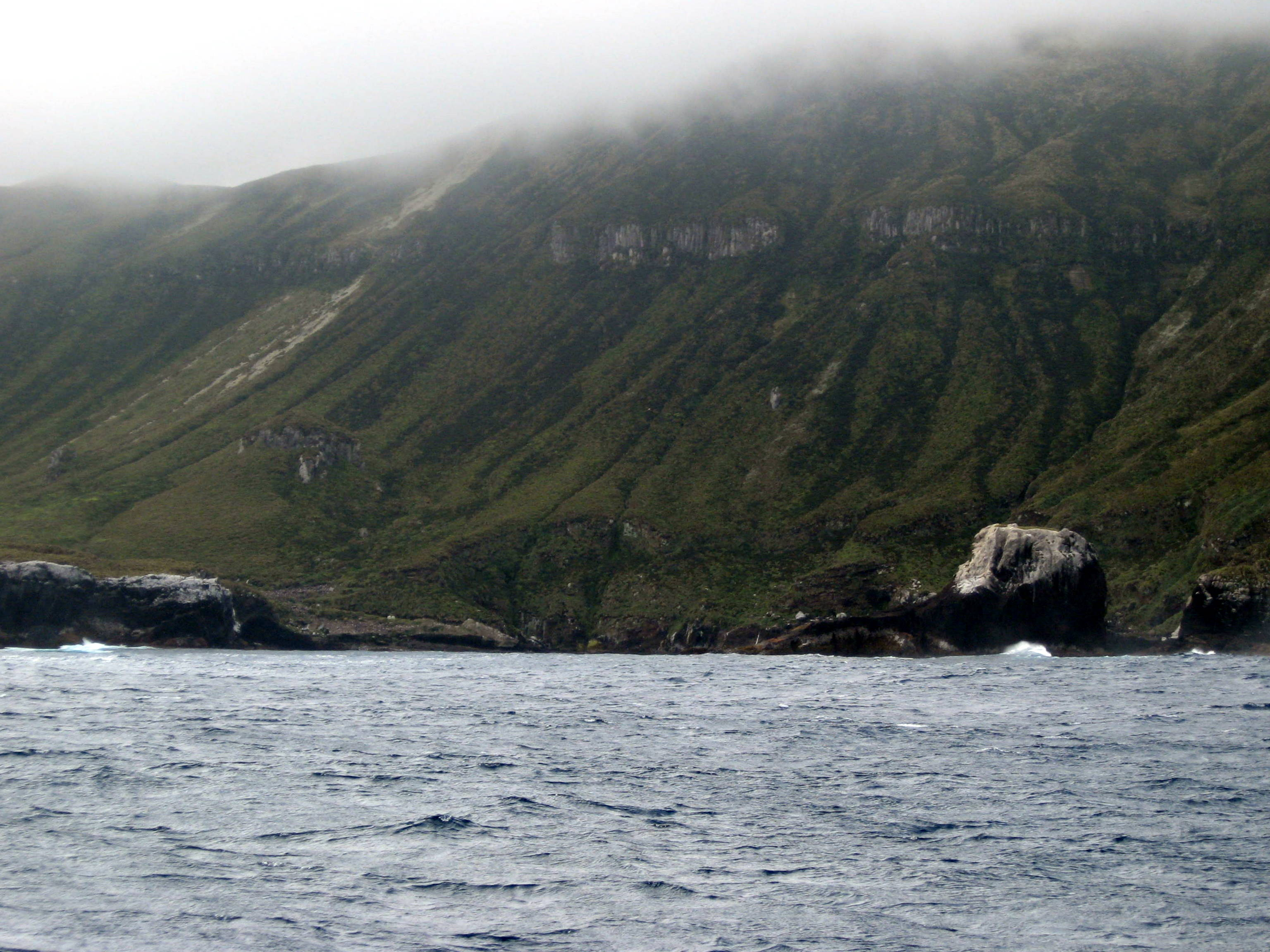
Spirit of the Dawn's survivors landed at South Bay

A much later attempt to establish cattle on the islands was short-lived (as were the cattle).

When the ship Spirit of the Dawn (with a crew of 16) foundered off the main island's coast in 1893, the eleven surviving crew spent nearly three months living as castaways on the island, living on raw muttonbirds, mussels and roots for 87 days before gaining the attention of the government steamer NZGSS Hinemoa by a flag made from their sail.

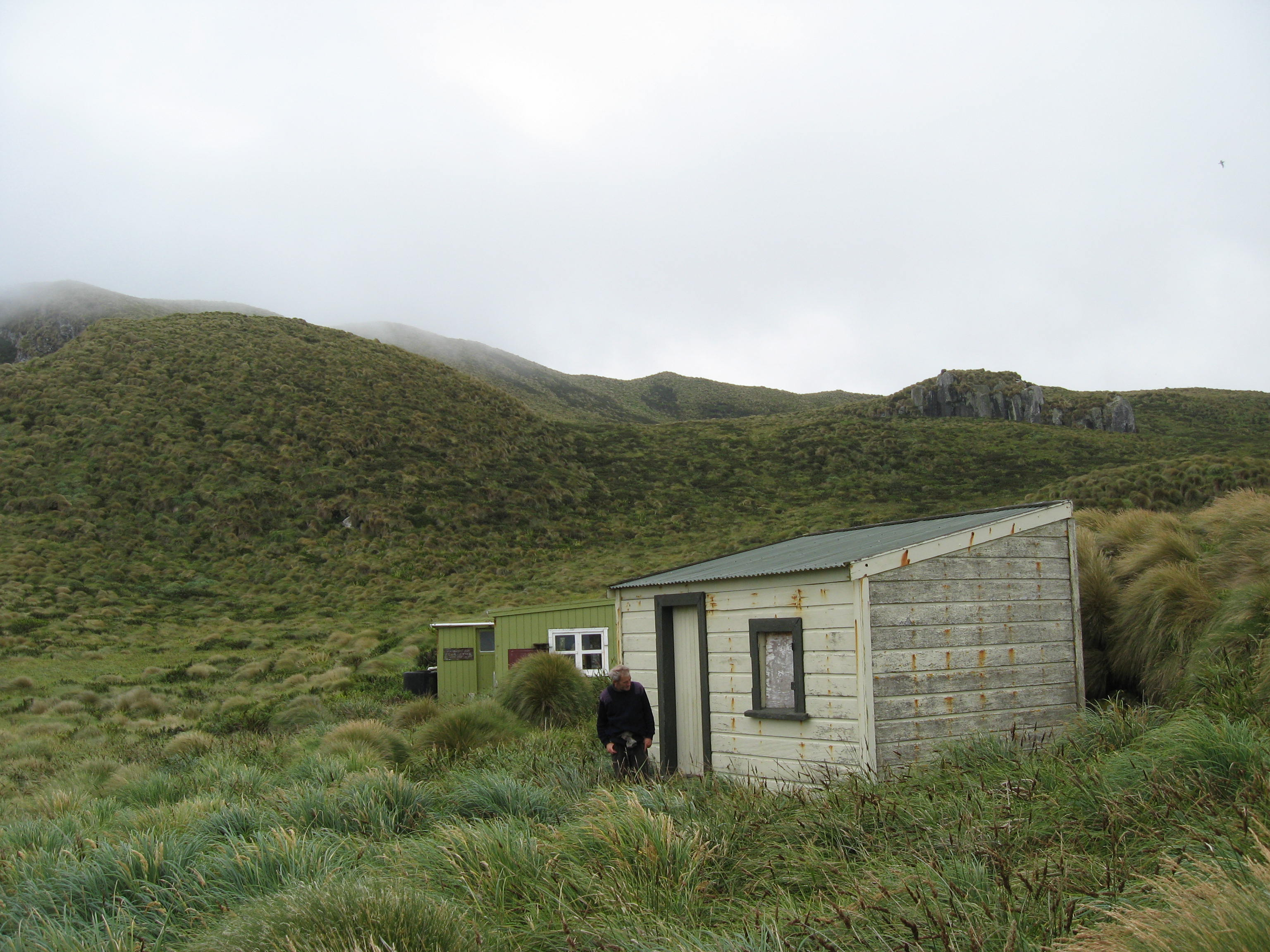
Castaway hut at Antipodes' northern end

A well-supplied castaway depot was available on the other end of the island, but the survivors' weak condition and the island's mountainous terrain prevented them from searching for depots.

The depot was found and used by the crew of the French barque President Felix Faure, wrecked in Anchorage bay in 1908, who were stranded for sixty days until rescued by HMS Pegasus.

The last wreck at the Antipodes was the yacht Totorore, with the loss of two lives, Gerry Clark and Roger Sale, in June 1999.

=== Nuclear testing proposals ===
In 1955, the British Government required a large site remote from population centres to test the new thermonuclear devices it was developing. 500 miles was considered the minimum safe distance from inhabited land or from shipping routes. Accordingly, various islands in the Pacific and Southern Oceans were considered, along with Antarctica. The Admiralty initially suggested the Antipodes Islands but in May 1955 proposed the Kermadec Islands as the preferred site.

== Flora and fauna ==
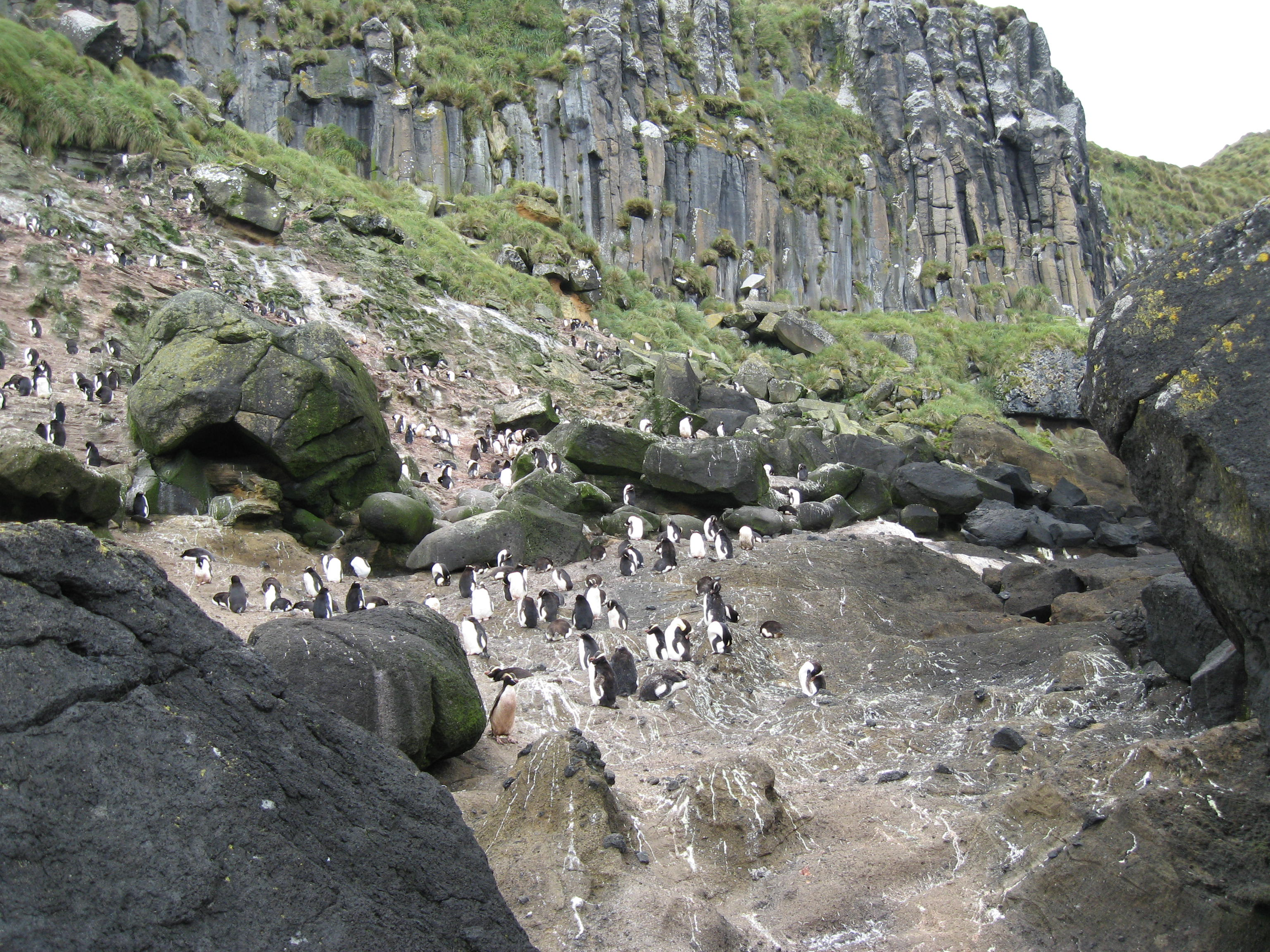
Penguin colony in Anchorage Bay

The flora of the islands has been recorded in detail, and includes megaherbs. The islands are also home to numerous bird species including the endemic Antipodes snipe, Antipodes parakeet, Reischek's parakeet, as well as several albatrosses, petrels and penguins, including half of the world population of the erect-crested penguin.

The original population of fur seals seems to be regionally extinct or in serious peril where "Upland Seals" once found on Antipodes and Macquarie Island have been claimed as a distinct subspecies with thicker furs by scientists although it is unclear whether these seals were genetically distinct.

=== Important Bird Area ===
The Antipodes group has been identified as an Important Bird Area (IBA) by BirdLife International because of its significance as a breeding site for several species of seabirds. The seabirds are southern rockhopper and erect-crested penguins, Antipodean, black-browed, light-mantled and white-capped albatrosses, and northern giant, grey and white-chinned petrels.

== Conservation ==
As with many other islands, introduced rodents have caused problems by preying on the indigenous wildlife. A "Million Dollar Mouse" campaign was launched in 2012 to raise funds for an eradication programme as part of the New Zealand government's "Predator Free 2050" project. In the winter of 2016, the Department of Conservation carried out bait drops totalling 65 tonnes from three helicopters, and searched with trained dogs for any remaining rodents, which eliminated the estimated 200,000 mice on Antipodes Island.

The island group is surrounded by the 2,173 km^{2} (839 sq mi) Moutere Mahue / Antipodes Island Marine Reserve.

== See also ==
- Composite Antarctic Gazetteer
- Territorial claims in Antarctica
- New Zealand Subantarctic Islands
- List of Antarctic and subantarctic islands
- List of islands of New Zealand
- List of islands
- Desert island
