= Bollons Island =

Island in Antipodes Islands group

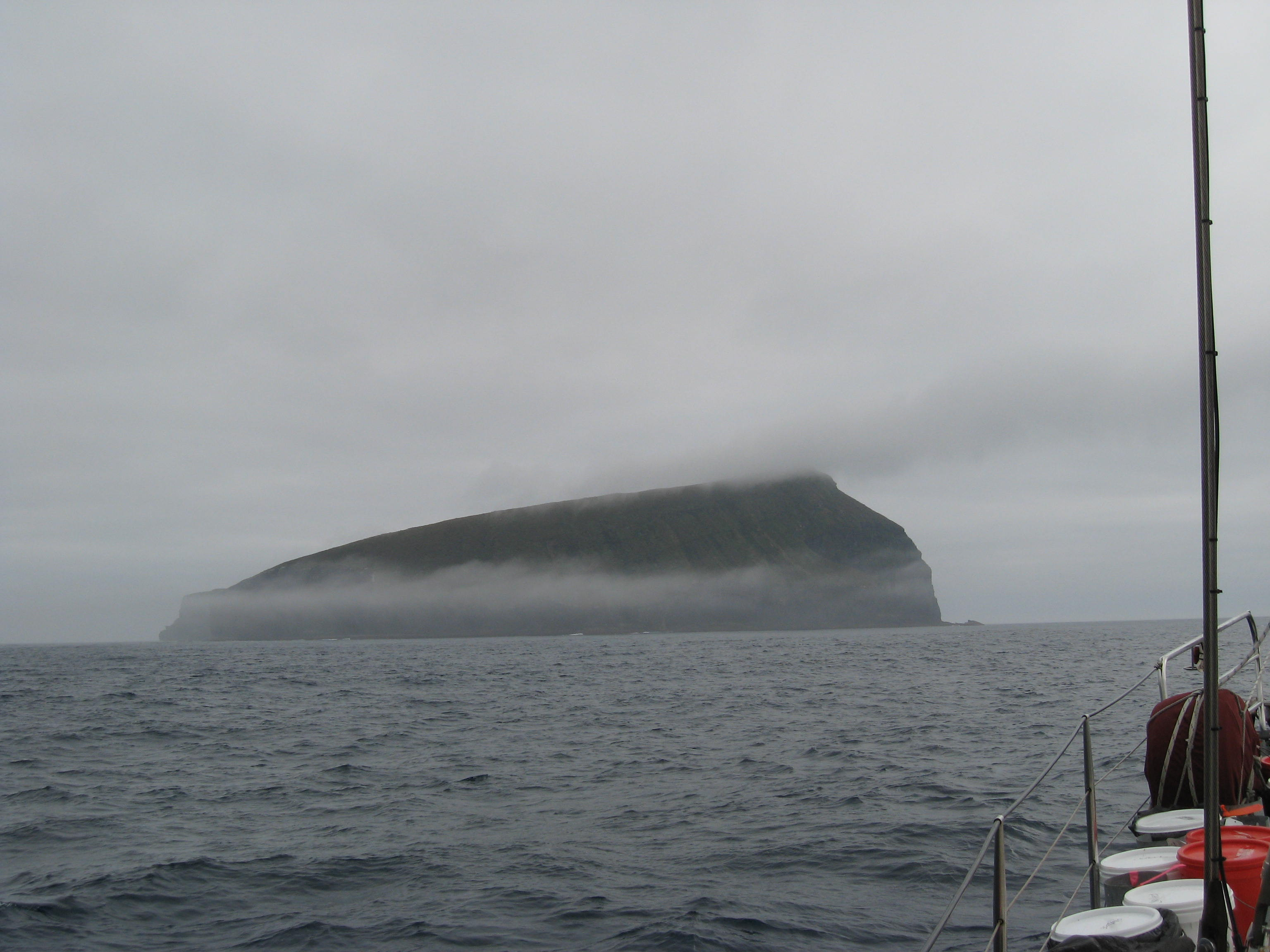
- Bollons Island, as seen from near Antipodes Island

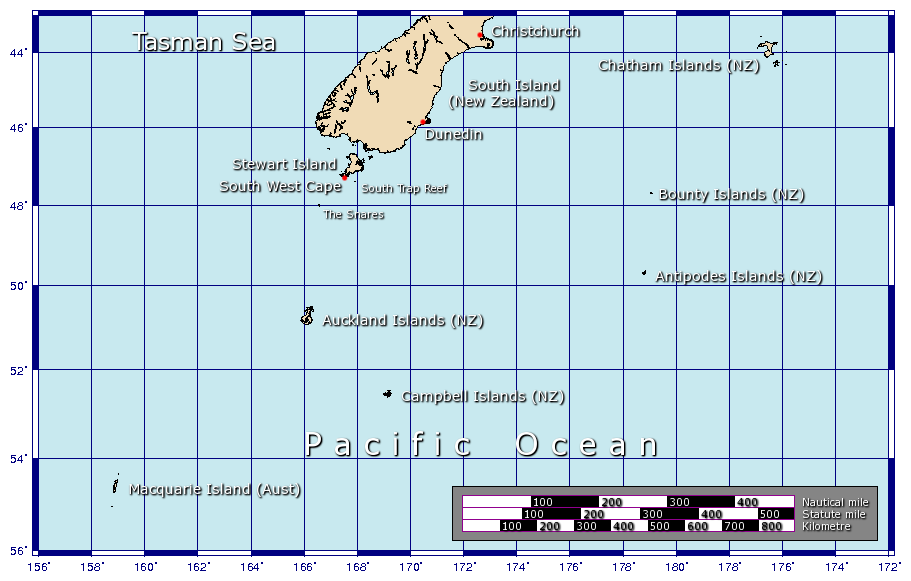
- Position relative to New Zealand and other outlying islands

Geography
- Coordinates: 49.645°S 178.819167°E
- Archipelago: Antipodes Islands
- Major islands: Antipodes Island, Bollons Island
- Area: 2 km^{2} (0.77 sq mi)
- Highest elevation: 202 m (663 ft)

Administration
- New Zealand

Bollons Island (49.645°S 178.819167°E) is a small island in New Zealand's subantarctic Antipodes Islands group. It is the second largest island in the group behind Antipodes Island.

== Geography ==
The island is roughly crescent-shaped, and has an area of 2 km^{2} (0.77 sq mi). It lies to the northeast of the group's main island, Antipodes Island, separated from it by a 1.2 kilometre wide strait. The smaller Archway Island lies immediately to the northwest of Bollons Island.

Bollons Island is dominated by a curved ridge running the length of the island, with a highest point 202 metres (663 ft) above sea level. Cliffs surround the island on all sides except the west.

== History ==
The island is named after John Bollons, Master of the New Zealand Marine Department vessels, NZGSS Hinemoa and SS Tutanekai.

Topographical map of Antipodes Islands

== Important Bird Area ==
The island is part of the Antipodes Islands Important Bird Area (IBA), identified as such by BirdLife International because of the significance of the group as a breeding site for several species of seabirds. It is home to the Reischek's parakeet (Cyanoramphus hochstetteri) and to the Antipodes parakeet (Cyanoramphus unicolor).

== See also ==
- Composite Antarctic Gazetteer
- New Zealand Subantarctic Islands
- List of Antarctic and subantarctic islands#List of subantarctic islands
- List of islands of New Zealand
- SCAR
- Territorial claims in Antarctica
