= Dundonald (ship) =

Former British barque

Coordinates: 50.607938°S 165.954817°E

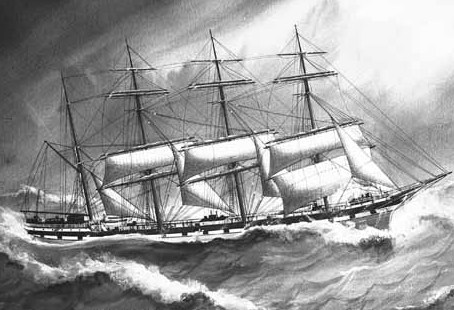

History

United Kingdom
- Name: Dundonald
- Owner: Kerr, Newton & Calder Co., Glasgow
- Builder: Workman, Clark & Co. Ltd., Belfast
- Launched: 1891
- Fate: Wrecked and sunk, 7 March 1907

General characteristics
- Type: Barque
- Tonnage: 2,205 GRT
- Length: 284 ft 2 in (86.61 m)
- Beam: 42 ft (13 m)
- Depth: 24 ft 4 in (7.42 m)
- Sail plan: Full-rigged ship
- Crew: 28

Dundonald was a British four-masted steel barque measuring 2,205 gross register tons launched in Belfast in 1891. It was involved in a wreck in 1907 in the New Zealand Subantarctic Islands. Only 15 of its 28 crew survived; they were rescued seven months later by a scientific expedition.

== Wreck ==
After setting sail from Sydney, Australia, bound for Falmouth, Cornwall, United Kingdom on 17 February 1907 with a cargo of wheat, the ship was forced onto rocks during a squall on 7 March 1907 on the west coast of Disappointment Island, 5 miles northwest of the Auckland Islands of New Zealand, and sank.

== Shipwrecked crew ==
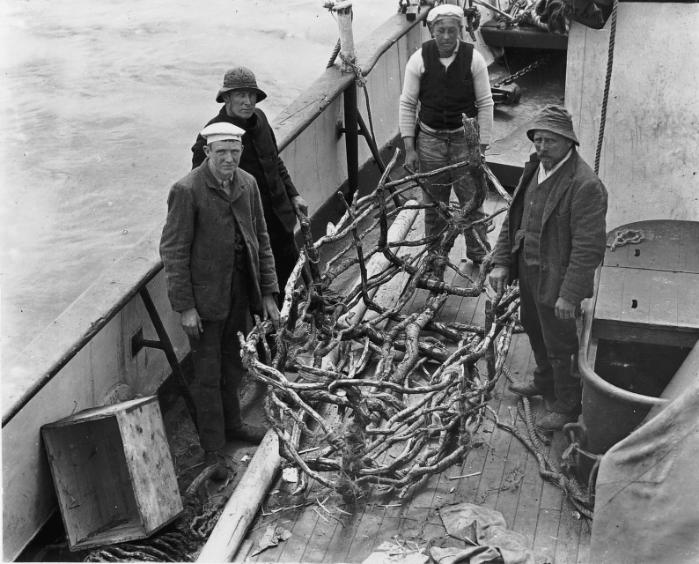
Karl Knudsen, Michael Puhl, Robert Ellis, and John Gratton on board the Hinemoa alongside a wooden frame of what had been a canvas boat (coracle)

Only 17 members of the 28 crew managed to escape the wreck and reach shore. One man, Walter Low, made the shore but slipped off the cliff back into the sea and was never seen again. Another, the mate Jabez Peters, died of exposure on 25 March 1907, eighteen days after the disaster. He was buried in the sand, but in November 1907, members of the Hinemoa's crew exhumed his body and re-interred it at the Hardwicke cemetery at Port Ross, in Erebus Cove, in the Auckland Islands. Peters' father and brother were also lost at sea in New Zealand waters.

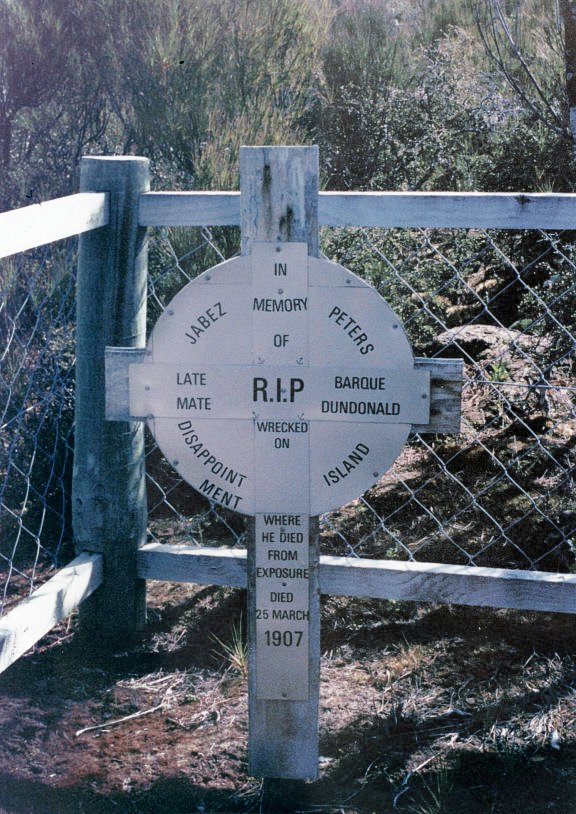
Restored grave of Jabez Peters

The crew included:

- Captain J.T. Thorburn – drowned
- James Thorburn, the Captain's son – drowned
- Jabez Peters, first mate – died of exposure on the island
- Daniel McLaughlin, second mate – survived
- Karl Knudsen, third mate – survived
- William Smith, steward – drowned
- Thomas Crawford, sailmaker – drowned
- Edward Lee, carpenter – drowned
- Charles Eyre of London, able bodied seaman – survived
- Arthur Iviney, ordinary seaman – survived
- John Judge of Ireland, a Santiago marine – survived
- Albert Roberts, cabinboy – survived
- Alfred Finlow (also known as Finlon) – survived
- John Gratton – survived
- Harry Walters – survived
- John Puhohe – survived
- Herriman Querfelt – survived
- Robert Ellis of Adelaide, Australia – survived
- Jack (John) Stewart of England – survived
- John Trotton – survived
- Michael Pul (also known as Michael Poole), a Russian Finn – survived
- Sam Watson – drowned
- Carl Anderson – drowned
- Holdersen – drowned
- Immanuel Naveati – drowned
- James Cromarty – drowned
- H. Larquer Boloom – drowned
- Walter Low – slipped off the cliff back into the sea after reaching shore on the night of the shipwreck and was never seen again

== Survival ==
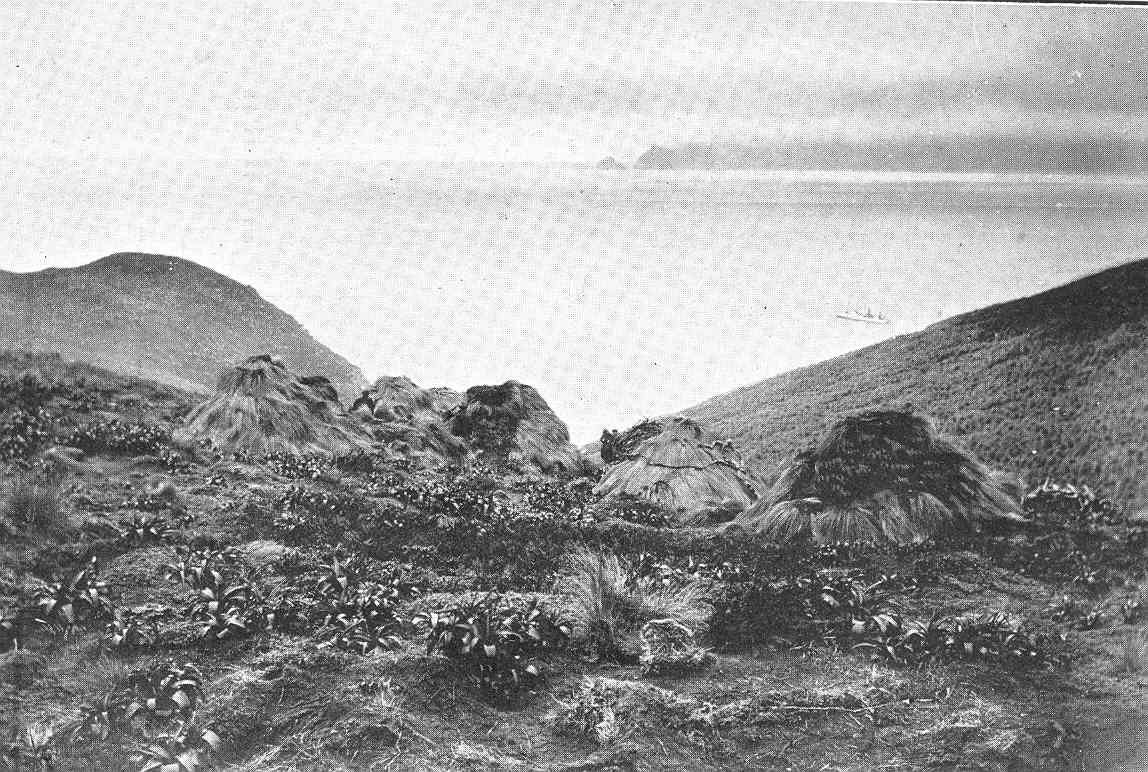
Huts made by the crew

The survivors lived for five months on Disappointment Island, a 3-mile-long (4.8 km) and 2-mile-wide (3.2 km) barren outcrop. For the first three days they ate raw white-capped mollymawk chicks until their supply of matches dried enough to get a fire going. They kept the same fire burning for the rest of their stay on the island, burrowed into the ground for shelter. The island had limited timber and their canvas tent could not withstand the constant storms that struck the island, so they improvised by digging into the ground and roofing over the hole they made with sod and shelter. The survivors also improvised clothes and tools from materials salvaged from the wreck or made from seals and the limited number of trees they found on the island. They ate about 12,000 mollymawk chicks, as well as seals, roots of the plant Azorella polaris, and seaweeds.

The crew knew that there was a food depot 4.3 nautical miles (8.0 km) away on Auckland Island. They built a coracle and oars from branches of the native shrub Veronica elliptica and ship's canvas to try to reach it. The first attempt in August landed three men on Auckland Island, but they failed to locate the depot. The coracle was smashed on launching in the second attempt. The men built another coracle, and in October, four of the crew landed on Auckland Island. The coracle was smashed on landing. The four crew hiked their way through rough terrain to reach Port Ross, where they located the food depot and a boat. The boat had no sails, so the castaways cut up their clothes for sails and ferried the remainder of the 15 men to Ross Harbour.

== Rescue ==
The castaways eventually were rescued by NZGSS Hinemoa, captained by John Bollons. On 16 November 1907, Hinemoa arrived at Port Ross to refresh the depot and to drop off some members of the 1907 Sub-Antarctic Islands Scientific Expedition. On arriving at the port, Hinemoa′s crew and passengers noticed that the government depot flag was flying at half mast - an indication of a shipwrecked crew. Captain Bollons launched a boat and, after landing, found the castaways.

Captain Bollons took only one of the crew off the island at that point. He asked Charles Eyre to act as cook for the expedition group intending to stay on Campbell Island for the remaining outward leg of the voyage to the Bounty Islands and Campbell Islands. The rest of the castaways were supplied with additional stores and were told the Hinemoa would call for them on the return trip.

When Hinemoa returned, the scientists on board asked the crew to bring the remaining coracle and various other articles with them to New Zealand. The coracle was exhibited at the Canterbury Museum in Christchurch, New Zealand, to raise funds for the benefit of the survivors. The survivors also received money from the Shipwreck Relief Society.
