= Hardwicke, New Zealand =

Former settlement in New Zealand

Hardwicke
- Abandoned settlement
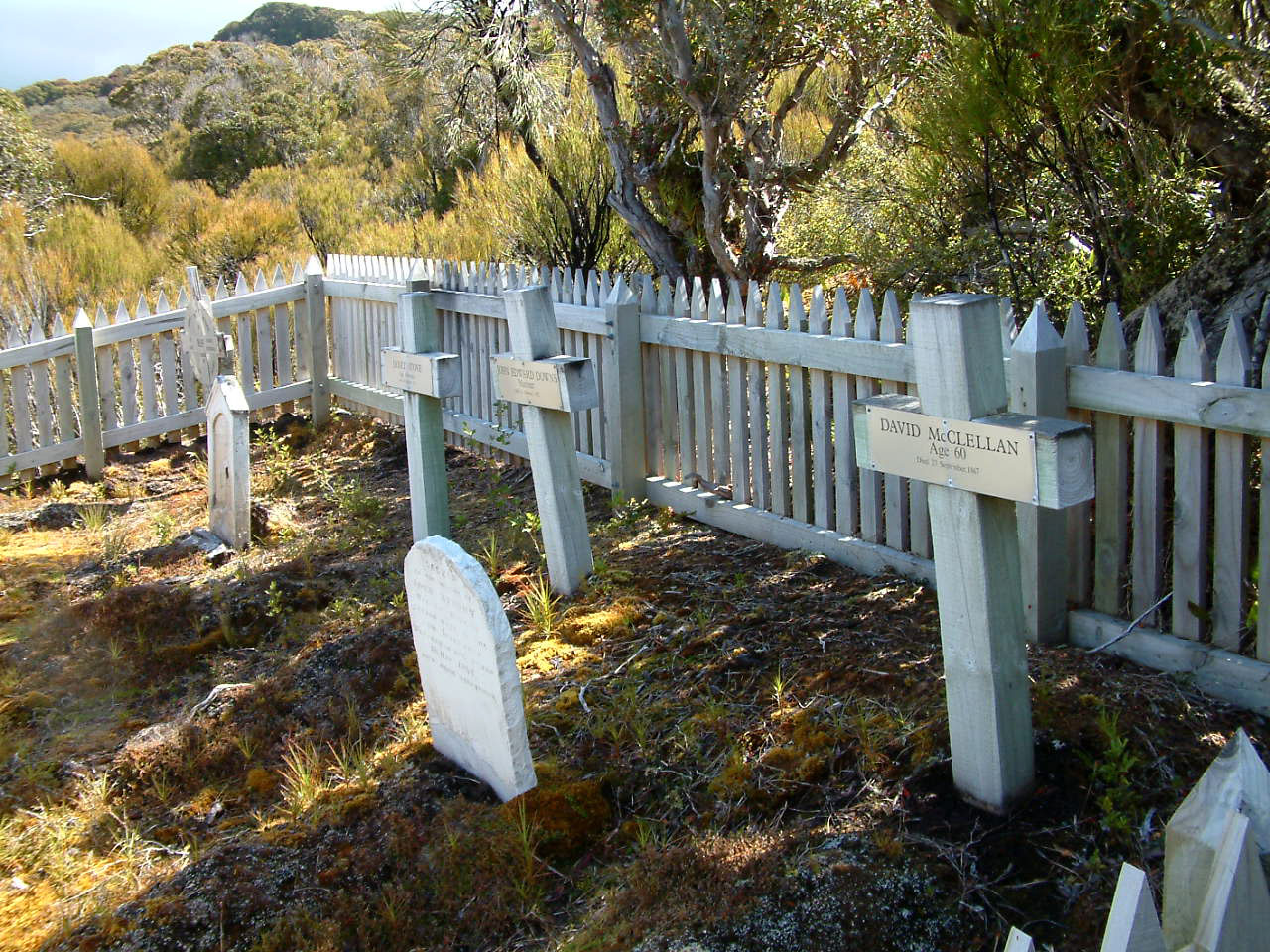
- Settlement graveyard, 2011
- Etymology: Earl of Hardwicke
- Interactive map of Hardwicke
- Coordinates: 50°32′40″S 166°12′37″E
- Country: New Zealand
- Island: Auckland Island
- Established: December 1849
- Abandoned: August 1852

Population (1850)
  - Total: 66

Hardwicke is a former agricultural and whaling community set up at Port Ross, a natural harbour on Auckland Island in the New Zealand Subantarctic Islands. The settlement was established in 1849 but was abandoned within three years.

== History ==
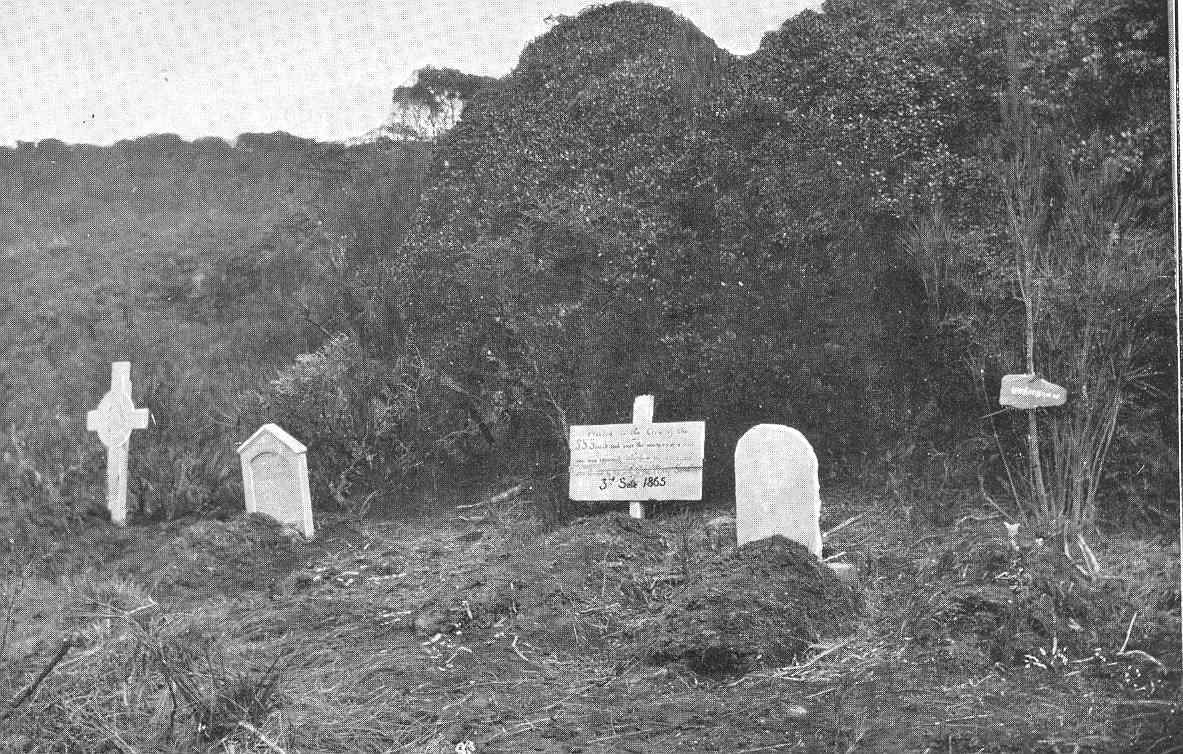
Settlement graveyard in 1909

This colonial settlement was first proposed in 1846. The Southern Whale Fishery Company was formed in Britain and granted a Royal Charter with its founder, Charles Enderby, as the resident chief commissioner and lieutenant governor of the new colony. Charles Enderby was the son of Samuel Enderby, founder of the London whaling company Samuel Enderby & Sons.

The Enderby Settlement was the start of the establishment of Hardwicke, the intended ship provisioning and whaling station in Erebus Cove, Port Ross, at the north-eastern end of Auckland Island, close to Enderby Island.

The Enderby Settlement efforts began in December 1849. Three ships, the Samuel Enderby, Fancy and Brisk from Britain arrived at Port Ross with the intending colonists, prefabricated houses and bricks with which to build chimneys. The settlers were carefully chosen to establish the new colony. They included women and children as well as farm workers, shipwrights, a surgeon, a civil engineer and other people with appropriate skills.

When the colonists arrived at Port Ross they found a group of Ngāti Mutunga settlers, with their Moriori slaves from the Chatham Islands, already there, having arrived in 1842. The new colonists compensated the Māori for enough land to build their colony, and then to help clear the forest, build roads and crew the ships, with the chiefs Matioro and Manutere (sometimes called Ngatere) appointed as constables to maintain law and order.

In January 1850, the settlement was officially named "Hardwicke" after the Earl of Hardwicke, the governor of the company. Two farm sites were chosen, one on Auckland Island and the other on Enderby Island. However crops were difficult to grow because of poor soils, harsh climate and high rainfall. Livestock were hard to muster in the thick scrub. Whaling was also unproductive. Within three years, special commissioners from the whaling company decided to close the settlement as it was too expensive to maintain.

It was abandoned in August 1852, after a period of two years and nine months during which five weddings, sixteen births and two infant deaths had taken place. In 1854, the island was also abandoned by Māori, most of whom resettled on Stewart Island, with the remainder returning to the Chathams. Most of Hardwicke's buildings were disassembled and removed, leaving little evidence that settlement had occurred – the prefabricated buildings were later auctioned off in Sydney.

Today all that remains is a cemetery containing six graves: the remains of infant settlers, and three subsequent castaways from the wrecks of the Dundonald (1907), Invercauld (1864), and General Grant (1866).
