= NZGSS Hinemoa =

New Zealand Government Service Steamer designed for lighthouse support and servicing

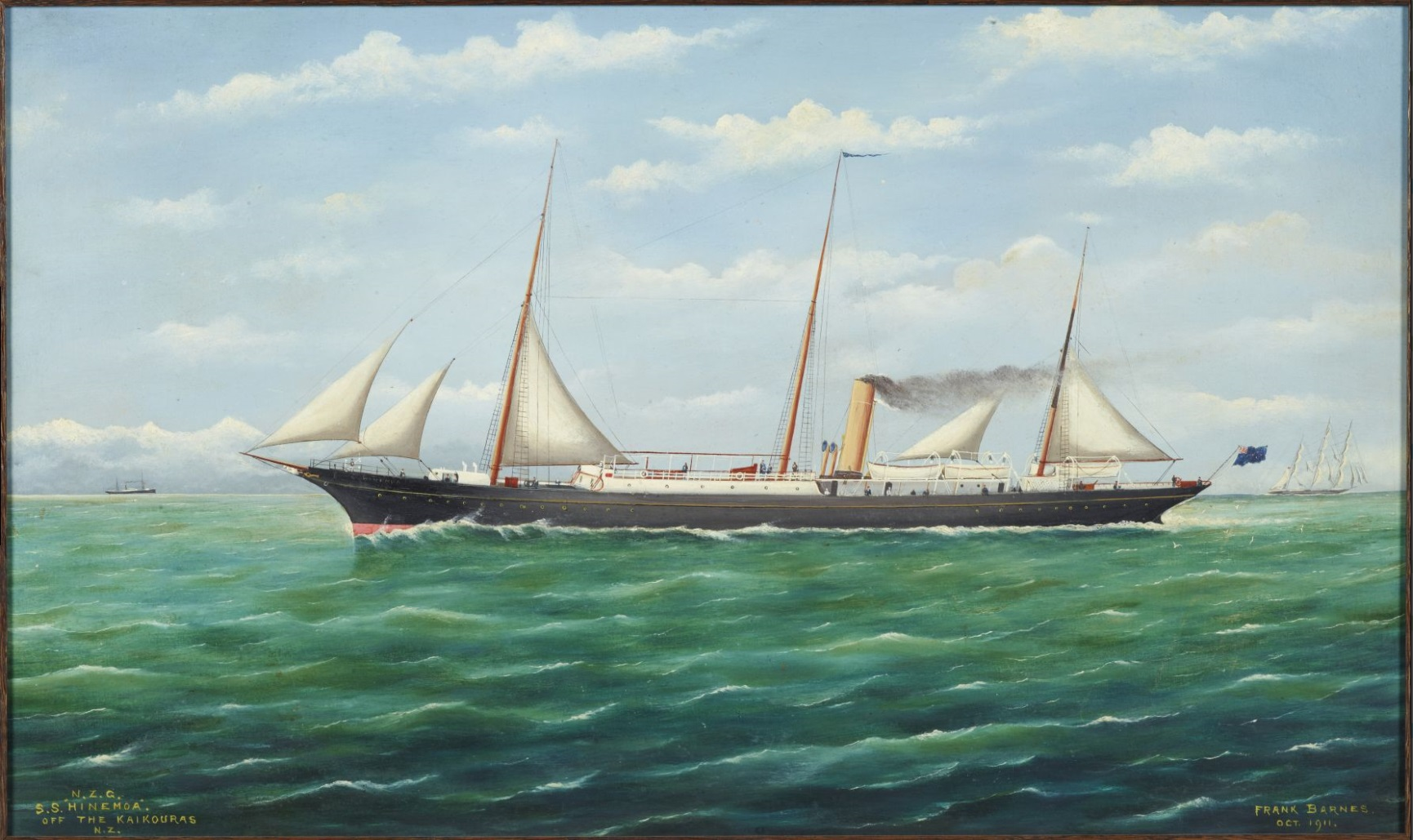
- Painting by Frank Barnes, 1911

History

New Zealand
- Name: NZGSS Hinemoa
- Owner: New Zealand Marine Department
- Builder: Robert Scott & Co.; (Cartsdyke, Greenock, Scotland)
- Cost: £23,500
- Completed: 1875
- Commissioned: 1876
- Decommissioned: 1944

General characteristics
- Type: Three masted steamer
- Tonnage: 542 long tons (551 tonnes)
- Length: 207 feet (63.1 metres)
- Beam: 25 feet (7.6 metres)
- Draught: 15 feet (4.6 metres)
- Installed power: 2 × compound-surface condensers of 150 bhp
- Speed: 12 knots

NZGSS Hinemoa was a 542-ton New Zealand Government Service Steamer designed specifically for lighthouse support and servicing, and also for patrolling New Zealand's coastline and carrying out castaway checks and searching for missing ships. It operated in New Zealand's territorial waters from 1876 to 1944.

It was instrumental in supplying many of the government castaway depots on the remote subantarctic islands, and rescuing a number of shipwreck victims, including those from the wreck of the Dundonald, the Anjou and the Spirit of the Dawn.

== History ==
Captain John Fairchild used the steamer to survey the Bounty Islands and Antipodes Islands in 1886, and the Herekino Harbour and the Whangape Harbour entrance in 1889. In 1891, while under the command of Captain Fairchild, the Hinemoa searched New Zealand's subantarctic and outlying islands for traces of the missing ships Kakanui and Assaye. While no trace was found of the former, the Assaye was suspected foundered off The Snares.

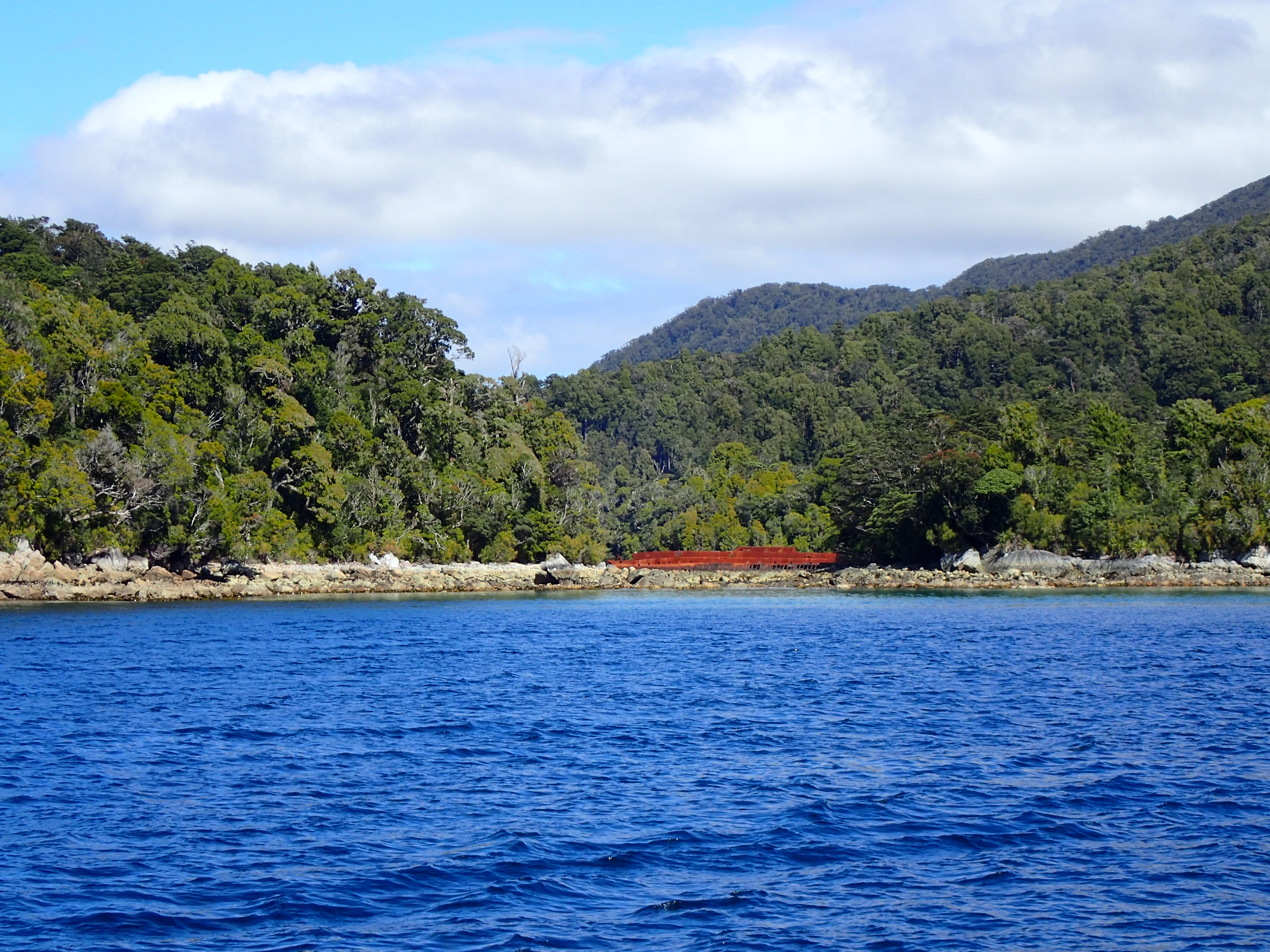
Remains of the GSS Stella, sister ship of NZGSS Hinemoa, in Taiari / Chalky Inlet

The Hinemoa provided assistance to the Sub-Antarctic Islands scientific expedition of 1907, a substantial scientific expedition sponsored by the Philosophical Institute of Canterbury, where important observations on the natural history of the islands were made. They were published as a two-volume work in 1909, edited by professor Charles Chilton. The five members of the 1908 Kermadec Islands Expedition were transported to Raoul Island on the Hinemoa in December 1907 and returned to New Zealand on the same vessel in November 1908.

Captain John Bollons was a notable master of the steamer from 1898; Bollons Island in the Antipodes Islands is named after him. Another to serve aboard the Hinemoa was William Edward Sanders, who won a Victoria Cross during World War I.

It had a sister ship, the GSS Stella, which carried out similar duties over the same time period. After its decommissioning in 1944, it was rejected for scrapping due to an oversupply at the time.

A 1919 photo album from the ship was found in a Danish antique shop and brought to Canterbury Museum in 2023. It is unknown how or when the album came to Denmark.

== Gallery ==
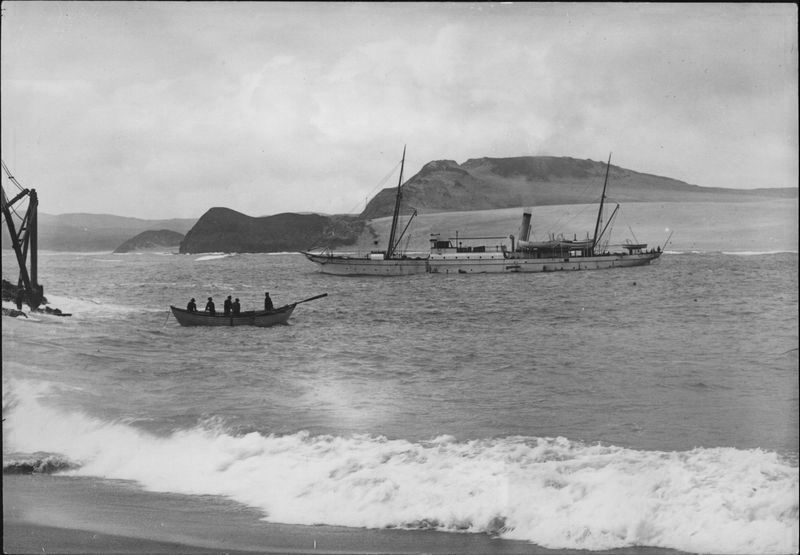
NZGSS Hinemoa in 1902 at Cape Maria van Diemen

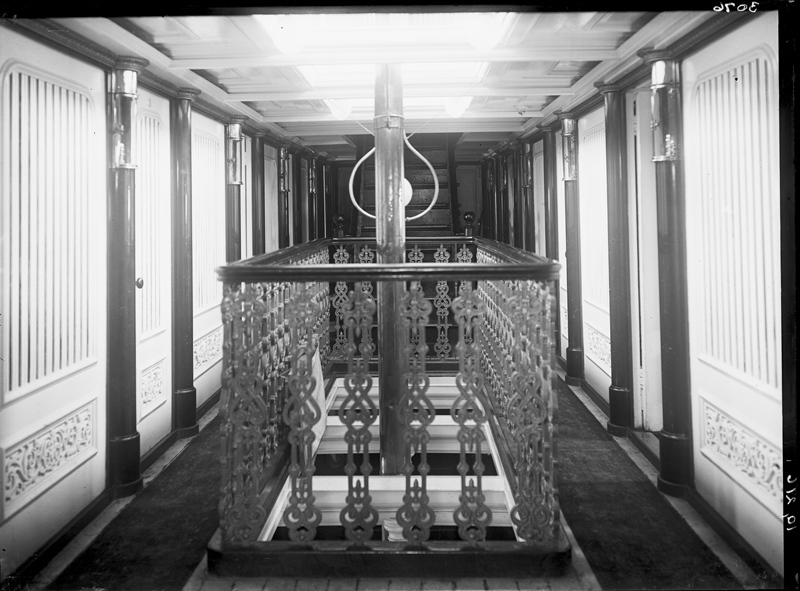
Interior of the NZGSS Hinemoa in 1902

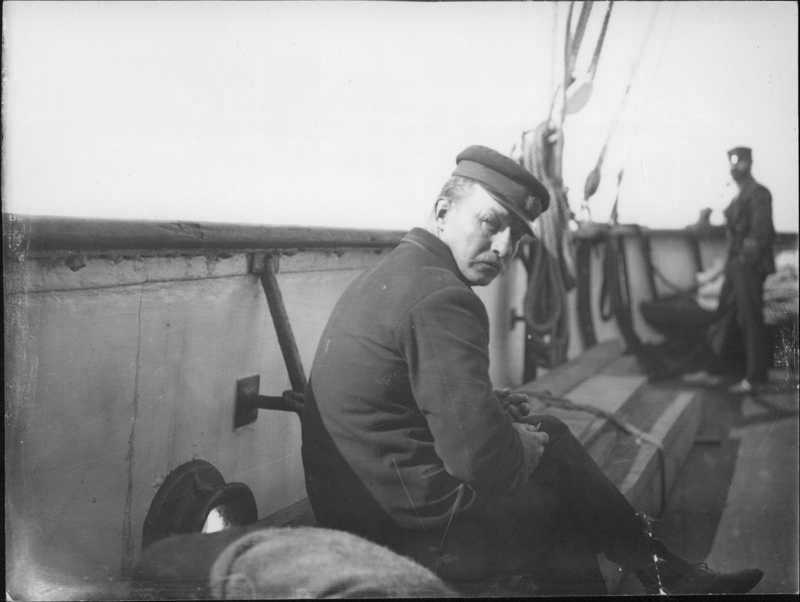
Mr. Cook, second officer of the NZGSS Hinemoa in 1944

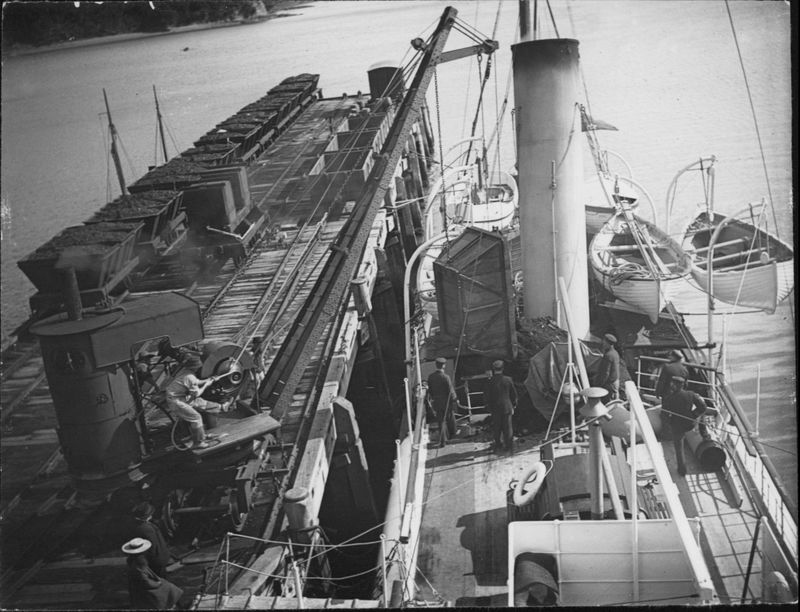
Refuelling the NZGSS Hinemoa with coal at Opua in 1902

== Sources ==
- Marshall, B. (2005). "From Sextants to Satellites: A Cartographic Timeline for New Zealand". New Zealand Map Society Journal. 18. ISSN 0113-2458.
- Peat, N. (2003). Subantarctic New Zealand: A Rare Heritage. Invercargill: Department of Conservation. ISBN 0-478-14088-6.
- Watt, J. P. C. (1989). Stewart Island's Kaipipi Shipyard and the Ross Sea Whalers. Havelock North: JPC Watt.
