= Disappointment Island =

Island off southern New Zealand

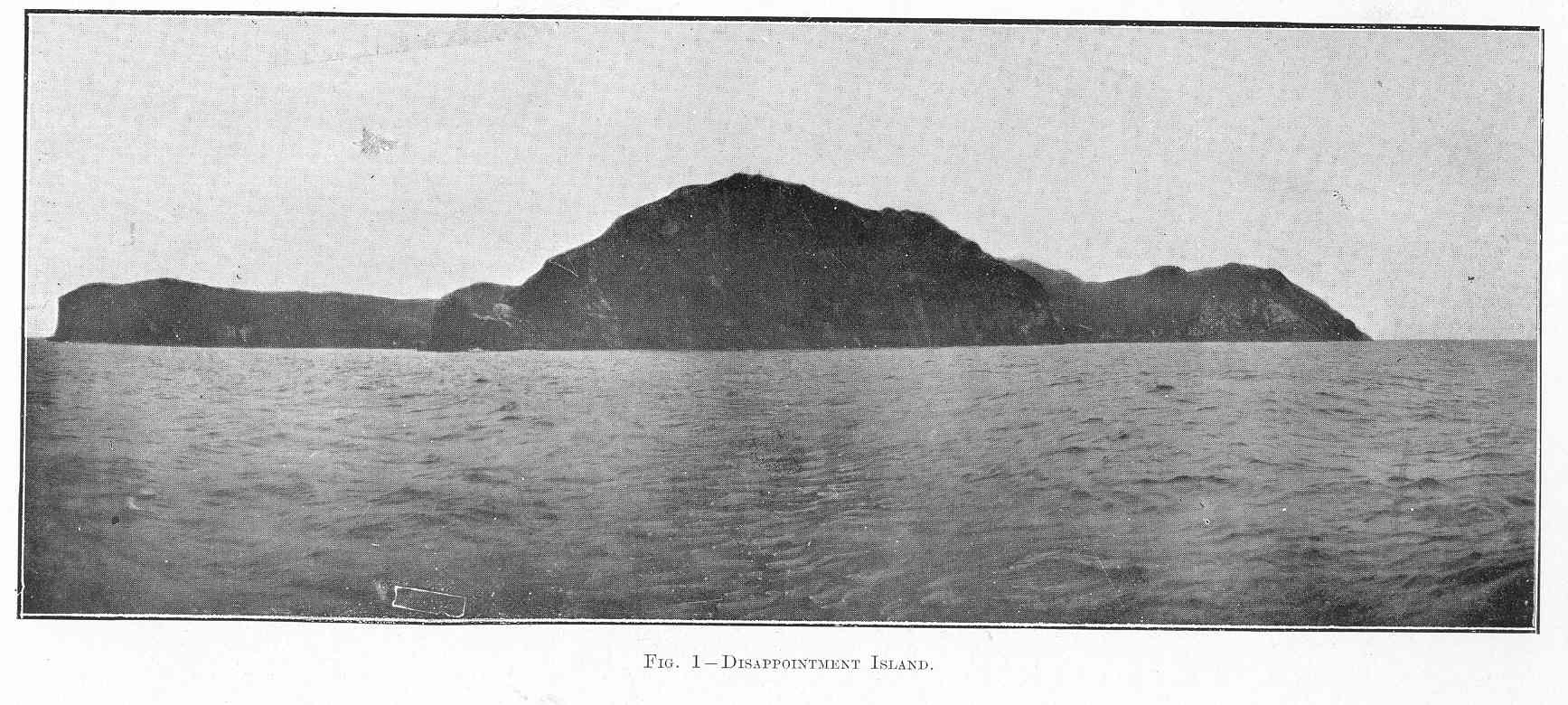
- A photo taken of the island in 1909.

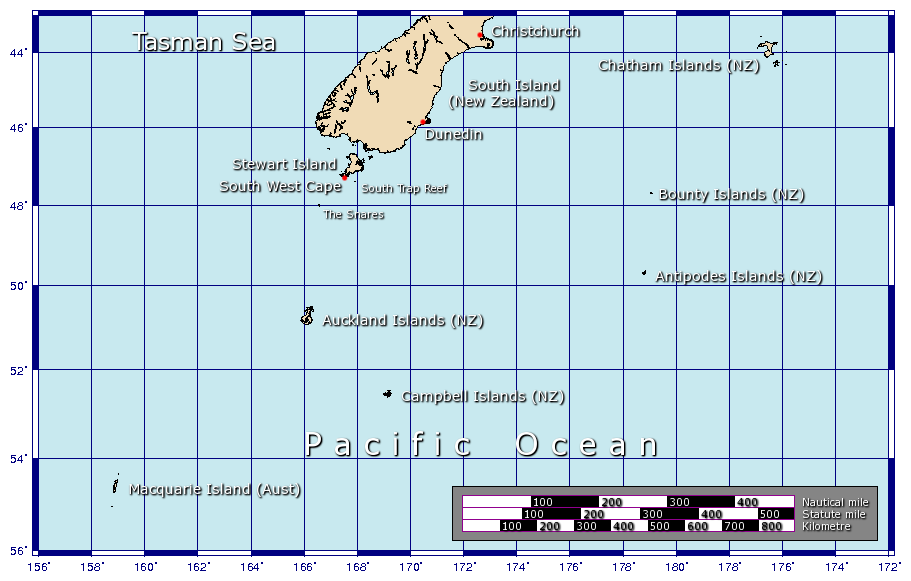
- Position of the Auckland Islands relative to New Zealand and other outlying islands

Geography
- Coordinates: 50°36.25′S 165°58.38′E
- Archipelago: Auckland Islands
- Area: 3.0 km^{2} (1.2 sq mi)
- Length: 3.35 km (2.082 mi)
- Width: 1.53 km (0.951 mi)

Demographics
- Pop. density: 0/km^{2} (0/sq mi)

Disappointment Island is one of seven uninhabited islands in the Auckland Islands archipelago, in New Zealand. It is 475 kilometres (295 mi) south of the country's main South Island and 8 kilometres (5 mi) from the northwest end of Auckland Island.

It is home to a large colony of white-capped albatrosses: about 65,000 pairs – nearly the entire world's population – nest there. Also on the island is the Auckland rail, endemic to the archipelago; once thought to be extinct, it was rediscovered in 1993. The island is known for being one of the least-modified subantarctic islands in New Zealand.

== History ==
On 7 March 1907, the Dundonald, a steel, four-masted barque, sank after running ashore on the west side of Disappointment Island. Twelve men drowned and seventeen men made it ashore. Two of the men died, and fifteen survivors waited seven months for rescue. They survived by eating mainly white-capped albatrosses (mollymawks), seals, and roots of the plant Azorella polaris. They built coracles out of veronica trees and used them to paddle to the mainland, where they eventually found the supplies and boat at Port Ross, a castaway depot, on Auckland Island.

The island was visited by a scientific expedition aboard the Hinemoa in November 1907, after the crew rescued the Dundonald survivors from Auckland Island. It was this ship which took the stranded men of the Dundonald home.

== Toponymy ==
British mariner Abraham Bristow, who was the first European to reach the Auckland Islands, named the island Disappointment Island because of how disappointing it was. Whilst aboard the ship Sarah in 1807, he unsuccessfully surveyed the island for fur seals and a base to reach the nearby fur seal rookeries on the western cliffs of Auckland Island.

== Important Bird Area ==
The island is part of the Auckland Island group Important Bird Area (IBA), identified as such by BirdLife International because of the significance of the group as a breeding site for several species of seabirds, including the white-capped mollymawk and white-chinned petrel, as well as the endemic Auckland shag, Auckland teal, Auckland rail, and Auckland snipe.

Over 150,000 pairs of white-chinned petrel breed there.

== See also ==
- Composite Antarctic Gazetteer
- Scientific Committee on Antarctic Research
- New Zealand subantarctic islands
- List of Antarctic and subantarctic islands
- List of islands of New Zealand
- List of islands
- Desert island
