= Birch Island =

Birch Island may refer to:

- Birch Island, British Columbia, an unincorporated community in British Columbia, Canada
- Birch Island (New Zealand), an island in the Clutha River in the South Island of New Zealand
- Birch Island or Hawaii 2, an island in St. George Lake, Liberty, Maine, United States
- Birch Island, an island in Lake Bonaparte (New York), United States

== See also ==
- Birch Islands, Maine, in Pleasant Bay, Washington County, Maine, United States
- Beryozovye Islands, islands in Russia
- Birch Island House, Somerset County, Maine, United States
- Birch Island Provincial Park, in Manitoba, Canada
- Birch Island Run, a stream in Pennsylvania, United States
- Rainbow Country, a local services board in Ontario, Canada; communities include Birch Island
