= List of islands of New Zealand =

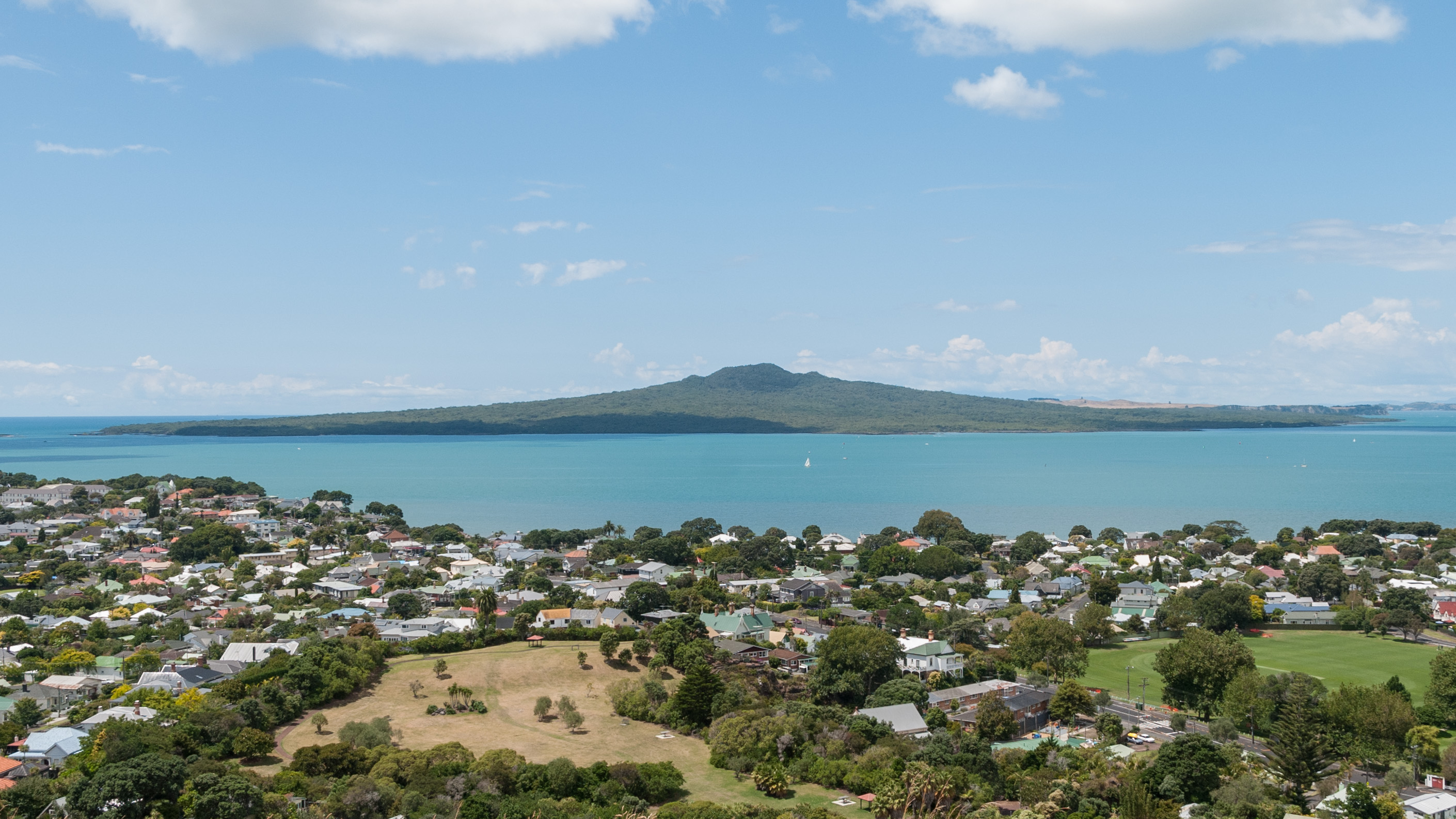
Rangitoto Island (pictured in the distance) is a volcanic island in the Hauraki Gulf near Auckland.

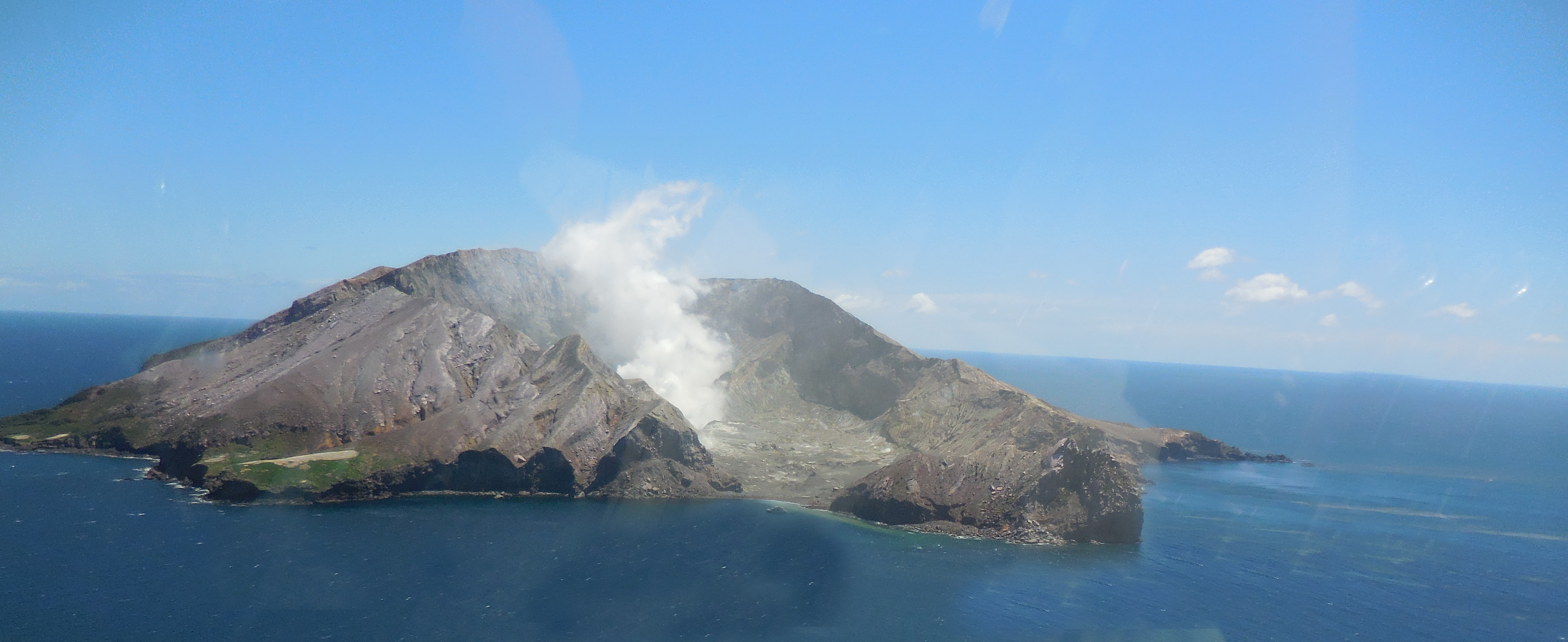
Whakaari / White Island Bay of Plenty

New Zealand consists of more than six hundred islands, mainly remnants of a larger land mass now beneath the sea. Only 12 of them are inhabited. New Zealand is the sixth-largest island country, and the third-largest located entirely in the Southern Hemisphere. The following is a list of islands of New Zealand.

The two largest islands – where most of the population lives – have names in both English and in the Māori language. They are the North Island or Te Ika-a-Māui and the South Island or Te Waipounamu. Various Māori iwi sometimes use other names, with some preferring to call the South Island Te Waka o Aoraki. The two islands are separated by the Cook Strait. In general practice, the term mainland refers to the North Island and South Island. However, the South Island alone is sometimes called "the mainland" – especially by its residents, as a nickname – because it is the larger of the two main islands. (Note: One cultural guide advises against using the term due to sensitivity.)

To the south of the South Island, Stewart Island is the largest of the smaller islands, and Waiheke Island in the urban Auckland Region has the largest population of the smaller islands.

== Listed by size ==
The following table lists the largest islands of New Zealand proper by area. (Note: The associated Cook Islands, Niue, Tokelau, and islands of the Antarctic Ross Dependency are excluded from this list.) River delta islands such as Rakaia Island (25.7 km^{2} (9.9 sq mi)), Fereday Island, Rangitata Island, and Inch Clutha (approximately 15 km^{2} (5.8 sq mi), 30 km^{2} (12 sq mi), and 35 km^{2} (14 sq mi) respectively) are omitted, as are temporary islands in braided river channels and tidal islands such as Moturoa / Rabbit Island (17 km^{2} (6.6 sq mi)). The country's largest island within a lake, Pomona Island, has an area of just 2.6 km^{2} (1.0 sq mi).

Rank	Name of island (Note: Name of the island as recognised by the New Zealand Geographic Board. In most cases this will be an official name, however some geographic features in New Zealand do not have official names. In these instances, the name in this column is the recorded name as per the NZGB.)	Indigenous name (Note: Other island names used by Māori or Moriori. Names that form part of a dual name or are an official name are omitted.)	Area (km^{2})	Area (sq mi)	% of NZ area	Population
1	South Island or Te Waipounamu (Note: South Island and Te Waipounamu are both recognised as distinct official names. This is different to dual place names in which there is a single name consisting of both English and Māori origins.)	Te Wahi Pounamu, Te Waka a Māui, Te Waka o Aoraki	150,437	58,084	56.2%	1,256,700
2	North Island or Te Ika-a-Māui (Note: North Island and Te Ika-a-Māui are both recognised as distinct official names. This is different to dual place names in which there is a single name consisting of both English and Māori origins.)	Aotearoa	113,729	43,911	42.3%	4,067,400
3	Stewart Island / Rakiura	Te Punga o Te Waka-a-Māui	1,683	650	0.6%	400
4	Chatham Island	Rekohu (Moriori); Wharekauri (Māori)	900	350	0.3%	600
5	Auckland Island	Mauka Huka	510	200	0.2%	0
6	Great Barrier Island (Aotea Island)		285	110	0.1%	850
7	Resolution Island	Mauīkatau, Tau Moana	209	81	0.1%	0
8	Rangitoto ki te Tonga / D'Urville Island		150	58	<0.1%	About 52
9	Campbell Island / Motu Ihupuku		113	44	<0.1%	0
10	Adams Island		100	39	<0.1%	0
11	Waiheke Island		92	36	<0.1%	9,360
12	Secretary Island	Kā Tū-waewae-o-Tū	81.4	31.4	<0.1%	0
13	Arapaoa Island		75	29	<0.1%	50
14	Pitt Island (Rangiauria)	Rangiaotea (Moriori)	62	24	<0.1%	38
15	Matakana Island		60	23	<0.1%	225
16	Raoul Island	Rangitahua	29.4	11.4	<0.1%	0
17	Te Hauturu-o-Toi / Little Barrier Island	Hauturu	28	11	~0.0%	0
18	Rangitoto Island		23.1	8.9	~0.0%	0
19	Antipodes Island		20	7.7	~0.0%	0
20	Kapiti Island		19.7	7.6	~0.0%	0
21	Kawau Island		19	7.3	~0.0%	81
22	Long Island	Motu Roa	18.99	7.33	~0.0%	0
23	Cooper Island	Ao-ata-te-pō	17.79	6.87	~0.0%	0
24	Ponui Island / Chamberlins Island	Te Pounui-o-Peretū	17.7	6.8	~0.0%	0
25	Great Mercury Island (Ahuahu)		17.2	6.6	~0.0%	0
26	Ruapuke Island		16	6.2	~0.0%	0
27	Motutapu Island		15.1	5.8	~0.0%	0
28	Codfish Island / Whenua Hou		14	5.4	~0.0%	0
29	Mayor Island / Tūhua		13	5.0	~0.0%	0
30	Coal Island	Te Puka-Hereka	11.6	4.5	~0.0%	0
31	Anchor Island	Pukenui	11.37	4.39	~0.0%	0
32	Mōtītī Island		10	3.9	~0.0%	27
33	Taukihepa / Big South Cape Island		9.4	3.6	~0.0%	0

== Listed by highest point ==
The table below lists the islands of New Zealand ranked by their highest elevation. All of these islands are located in either harbours or the open sea. The country’s tallest island situated within a lake is Pomona Island, which rises to 511 metres (1,677 ft) above sea level, approximately 333 metres (1,093 ft) above the normal lake level of Lake Manapouri.

Rank	Name of island	Highest point	Name of peak	Type of peak
1	South Island or Te Waipounamu	3,754 m (12,316 ft)	Aoraki/Mount Cook	Tectonic
2	North Island or Te Ika-a-Māui	2,797 m (9,177 ft)	Mount Ruapehu	Volcanic
3	Secretary Island	1,196 m (3,924 ft)	Mount Grono	Tectonic
4	Resolution Island	1,069 m (3,507 ft)	Mount Clerke	Tectonic
5	Stewart Island	980 m (3,220 ft)	Mount Anglem / Hananui	Tectonic
6	Rangitoto ki te Tonga / D'Urville Island	729 m (2,392 ft)	Takapōtaka / Attempt Hill	Tectonic
7	Te Hauturu-o-Toi / Little Barrier Island	722 m (2,369 ft)	Mount Hauturu	Volcanic
8	Adams Island	705 m (2,313 ft)	Mount Dick	Volcanic
9	Auckland Island	659 m (2,162 ft)	Cavern Peak	Volcanic
10	Great Barrier Island	627 m (2,057 ft)	Mount Hobson	Tectonic
11	Long Island	620 m (2,030 ft)	Unnamed	Tectonic
12	Campbell Island / Motu Ihupuku	569 m (1,867 ft)	Mount Honey	Volcanic
13	Arapaoa Island	559 m (1,834 ft)	Narawhia	Tectonic
14	Cooper Island	523 m (1,716 ft)	Unnamed	Tectonic
15	Kapiti Island	521 m (1,709 ft)	Tuteremoana	Tectonic
16	Raoul Island	516 m (1,693 ft)	Moumoukai Peak	Volcanic
17=	Anchor Island	417 m (1,368 ft)	Unnamed	Tectonic
17=	Taranga (Hen) Island	417 m (1,368 ft)	The Pinnacles	Tectonic
19	Bauza Island	383 m (1,257 ft)	Unnamed	Tectonic
20	Maud Island/Te Hoiere	368 m (1,207 ft)	Unnamed	Tectonic
21	Antipodes Island	366 m (1,201 ft)	Mount Galloway	Volcanic
22	Forsyth Island	356 m (1,168 ft)	Unnamed	Tectonic
23	Mayor Island / Tūhua	355 m (1,165 ft)	Opuahau	Volcanic
24	Moutohora Island	353 m (1,158 ft)	Motu Hara	Volcanic
25	Breaksea Island	350 m (1,150 ft)	Unnamed	Tectonic
26	Solander Island / Hautere	330 m (1,080 ft)	Unnamed	Volcanic
27	Whakaari / White Island	321 m (1,053 ft)	Mount Gisborne	Volcanic
28	Chatham Island	299 m (981 ft)	Unnamed	Volcanic
29	Blumine Island / Oruawairua	298 m (978 ft)	Unnamed	Tectonic
30	Manawatāwhi/Great Island	295 m (968 ft)	Unnamed	Tectonic
31	Mangere Island (Chatham Islands)	292 m (958 ft)	Whakapa	Tectonic
32	Stephens Island / Takapourewa	283 m (928 ft)	Unnamed	Tectonic
33	Rangitoto Island	260 m (850 ft)	Rangitoto	Volcanic
34	Coal Island	251 m (823 ft)	Unnamed	Tectonic
35	Codfish Island / Whenua Hou	250 m (820 ft)	Unnamed	Tectonic
36	Nukuwaiata Island	247 m (810 ft)	Unnamed	Tectonic
37	Pitt Island / Rangiauria	241 m (791 ft)	Waihere	Tectonic
38	Macauley Island	238 m (781 ft)	Mount Haszard	Volcanic
39	Taukihepa / Big South Cape Island	235 m (771 ft)	Unnamed	Tectonic
40	Whatupuke Island	234 m (768 ft)	Unnamed	Tectonic
41=	Great Mercury Island (Ahuahu)	231 m (758 ft)	Mount Mohi	Volcanic
41=	Waiheke Island	231 m (758 ft)	Maunganui	Tectonic
43	Jacquemart Island	229 m (751 ft)	Unnamed	Volcanic
44	Wakaterepapanui Island	225 m (738 ft)	Unnamed	Tectonic
45	South East Island / Rangatira	224 m (735 ft)	Unnamed	Tectonic
46	Rakitu Island	220 m (720 ft)	Unnamed	Tectonic
47	Aorangi Island	216 m (709 ft)	Unnamed	Tectonic
48=	Cuvier Island	214 m (702 ft)	Unnamed	Tectonic
48=	Little Mangere Island	214 m (702 ft)	Whakapa	Tectonic
50	Moekawa / South West Island	207 m (679 ft)	Unnamed	Tectonic
51	Bollons Island	202 m (663 ft)	Unnamed	Volcanic
52	Indian Island	196 m (643 ft)	Unnamed	Tectonic
53	Tawhiti Rahi Island	191 m (627 ft)	Unnamed	Tectonic
54	Tinui Island (Rangitoto Islands)	190 m (620 ft)	Unnamed	Tectonic
55	Matapara / Pickersgill Island	186 m (610 ft)	Unnamed	Tectonic
56=	Great Island	185 m (607 ft)	Unnamed	Tectonic
56=	Kaikōura Island	185 m (607 ft)	Mitre Peak	Tectonic
56=	Pearl Island	185 m (607 ft)	Unnamed	Tectonic
59	Coppermine Island	184 m (604 ft)	Huarewa	Tectonic
60	Kawau Island	182 m (597 ft)	Grey Heights	Tectonic
61	Te Kakaho Island	179 m (587 ft)	Unnamed	Tectonic
62	Motukawanui Island	177 m (581 ft)	Maungapouri	Tectonic
63	Ōhau / West Island	177 m (581 ft)	Unnamed	Tectonic
64	Motutapere Island	175 m (574 ft)	Unnamed	Tectonic
65	Ponui Island	173 m (568 ft)	Ponui	Tectonic
66	Motuoruhi Island	169 m (554 ft)	Unnamed	Tectonic
67	Lady Alice Island	158 m (518 ft)	Unnamed	Tectonic
68	The Castle / Rangiwheau	156 m (512 ft)	Unnamed	Tectonic
69	Long Island, Marlborough	152 m (499 ft)	Unnamed	Tectonic
70	Noble Island	154 m (505 ft)	Unnamed	Tectonic
71	Chalky Island	151 m (495 ft)	Unnamed	Tectonic
72=	Red Mercury Island	150 m (490 ft)	Unnamed	Volcanic
72=	Puangiangi Island	150 m (490 ft)	Unnamed	Tectonic

== In harbours and the open sea ==
- Aiguilles Island
- Aldermen Islands
- Allports Island
- Amerikiwhati Island
- Anatakupu Island
- Anchor Island
- Anchorage Island
- Anvil Islet
- Aorangaia Island
- Araara Island
- Arakaninihi Island
- Arapaoa Island
- Aroha Island
- Aua / King Billy Island
- Awarua Rock
- Bauza Island
- Beehive Island / Taungamaro Island
- Bell Island
- Bench Island
- Best Island
- Bignell Reef
- Bishop and Clerks Islands
- Bland Rocks
- Blue Gum Island
- Blumine Island / Ōruawairua
- Boat Passage Islands
- Boom Rock
- Bragg Nugget
- Breaksea Island
- The Brothers
- Browne Island
- Browns Island (Motukorea)
- Bull and Cow Islands
- Calliope Island, Whangārei Heads
- Catherine Island, Charles Sound
- Cavalli Islands
- Chalky Island
- Chetwode Islands
- Coal Island
- Codfish Island / Whenua Hou
- Cooper Island
- Dog Island
- Cuvier Island
- Dragon Island
- Eleanor Island, Charles Sound
- Elizabeth Island
- Fanny Island, Charles Sound
- Fergusson Island, Southland
- Fisherman Island
- Forsyth Island
- Frenchman Island, Whangārei Heads
- Goat Island / Rakiriri
- Great Barrier Island/Aotea
- Great Island
- Green Island (Okaihe)
- Green Island
- Guano Island, Whangārei Heads
- Hares Ears
- Haulashore Island
- Hen and Chicken Islands
- High Island
- Herald Island
- Horomaka Island
- Indian Island
- Jacky Lee Island
- Kaikōura Island
- Kapiapia Rock
- Kapiti Island
- Kārewa / Gannet Island
- Karewa Island
- Kawau Island
- Kopuahingahinga Island, Manukau Harbour
- Lee Island
- Lloyd Island
- Long Island, Marlborough
- Long Island (Southland)
- Māhungarape / Round Island
- Mahurangi Island
- Mahurangi Island (Goat Island)
- Mākaro / Ward Island
- Mana Island
- Matakana Island
- Matapara / Pickersgill Island
- Matapia Island
- Matiu / Somes Island
- Maud Island/Te Hoiere
- Mauitaha Island, Whangārei Heads
- Mayor Island / Tūhua
- Mercury Islands
- Mokohinau Islands
- Mokopuna Island
- Mōtītī Island
- Motuara Island
- Motuareronui / Adele Island
- Motuarohia Island
- Motueka Island (Pigeon Island)
- Motuhoa Island, Tauranga Harbour
- Motuihe Island
- Motukaraka Island
- Motukaraka Island, Hokianga
- Motukaroro Island
- Motukōrure Island / Centre Island
- Motukawao Islands
- Motuketekete Island
- Motukiore Island, Parua Bay
- Motukōkako Island / Piercy Island
- Motu Matakohe / Limestone Island
- Motunau Island
- Motunau / Plate Island
- Motuora
- Motuoroi Island
- Moturaka Island
- Moturoa / Rabbit Island
- Moturekareka Island
- Moturiki Island
- Motutapu Island
- Moutohora Island/Whale Island
- Native Island
- Nee Island
- Ngarango Otainui Island
- Shelter Island
- Ngā Motu / Sugar Loaf Islands
- Ninepin Rock, Manukau Harbour
- Noble Island
- North Island
- Okorotere Island
- Opahekeheke Island
- Open Bay Islands
- Ōtamahua / Quail Island
- Pakatoa Island
- Pakihi Island
- Pararekau Island, Manukau Harbour
- Pearl Island
- Pepin Island (a tied island connected to the mainland)
- Ponui Island
- Poor Knights Islands
- Portland Island
- Pourewa Island
- Puketutu Island
- Putauhinu Island
- Quarantine Island / Kamau Taurua
- Rabbit Island (Bluff)
- Rabbit Island (Coromandel, North)
- Rabbit Island (Coromandel, South)
- Rabbit Island (Great Barrier Island)
- Rabbit Island (Warkworth)
- Rat Island (Whangārei)
- Rakino Island
- Rakitu Island
- Rangitoto Island
- Rangitoto Islands, Marlborough Sounds
- Rangitoto ki te Tonga / D'Urville Island
- Raratoka Island
- Resolution Island
- Ripapa Island
- Rotoroa Island
- Rurima Rocks, including Rurima Island
- Ruapuke Island
- Secretary Island
- Shark Island, Manukau Harbour
- Shoe Island / Motuhoa
- Simmonds Islands
- Slipper Island
- South Island
- Stephens Island / Takapourewa
- Stephenson Island
- Stewart Island
- Taieri Island / Moturata
- Takangaroa Island
- Taputeranga Island
- Tarahiki Island
- Tarakanahi Island
- Tata Islands
- Taukihepa / Big South Cape Island
- Te Hauturu-o-Toi / Little Barrier Island
- Te Motu-o-Kura / Bare Island
- Te Hāwere-a-Maki / Goat Island
- Te Tio Island
- Tikitiki Island, (The Ninepin), Bay of Islands
- Tiritiri Matangi Island
- Tītī / Muttonbird Islands
- Tokomāpuna Island / Aeroplane Island
- Tonga Island
- Ulva Island
- Urupukapuka Island
- Waiheke Island
- Waikaranga Island
- Wakatehāua Island
- Walker Island
- Watchman Island
- Whakaari / White Island
- Whanganui Island
- Whangaokeno / East Island
- Whatitirinui Island
- White Island (Otago)
- Wiroa Island, Manukau Harbour

== In rivers and lakes ==
- Arran Island (in Lake Te Anau)
- Belle Vue Island (in Lake Manapouri)
- Birch Island (in the Clutha River / Mata-Au)
- Bird Island (in the Pōrangahau River)
- Black Jacks Island (in Lake Benmore)
- Budges Island (in Big Lagoon)
- Bull Island (in Lake Wānaka)
- Buncrana Island (in Lake Manapouri)
- Bute Island (in Lake Te Anau)
- Channel Islands (in Lake Manapouri)
- Cumbrae Island (in Lake Te Anau)
- Dome Islands (in Lake Te Anau)
- Doubtful Island (in Lake Te Anau)
- Centre Island
- Entrance Island (in Lake Te Anau)
- Erin Island (in Lake Te Anau)
- Fereday Island (in the Rakaia River delta)
- Harwich Island (in Lake Wānaka)
- Hidden Island (in Lake Wakatipu)
- Holmwood Island, (in Lake Manapouri)
- Inch Clutha (in the Clutha / Mata-Au delta)
- Junction Island (in Lake Benmore)
- Karihoa Island (in Waikato River)
- Kaiwaka No.1 Island (in Waikato River delta)
- Kaiwaka No.2 Island (in Waikato River delta)
- Lee Island (in Lake Te Anau)
- Mahara Island (in Lake Manapouri)
- Manutahi Island (in Waikato River)
- Mary Island (in Lake Hauroko)
- Mokoia Island (in Lake Rotorua)
- Motakorea Island (in Waikato River)
- Motuariki Island (in Lake Tekapo)
- Motukakako Island (in Waikato River delta)
- Motutaiko Island (in Lake Taupō)
- Moutoa Island (in the Whanganui River)
- Mou Tapu (in Lake Wānaka)
- Mou Waho (in Lake Wānaka)
- Motutieke Island (in Waikato River delta)
- Namuheiriro Island (in Waikato River)
- Ngāhinapōuri Island (in Waikato River delta)
- Opuawhanga Island (in Waikato River)
- Pigeon Island/Wāwāhi Waka (in Lake Wakatipu)
- Pig Island/Mātau (in Lake Wakatipu)
- Pomona Island (in Lake Manapouri)
- Puehunui Island (in Waikato River delta)
- Rabbit Island (Canterbury) (in Rakaia River)
- Rakaia Island (in the Rakaia River delta)
- Rangitata Island (in the Rangitata River delta)
- Rona Island (in Lake Manapouri)
- Ruby Island (in Lake Wānaka)
- Silver Island (in Lake Hāwea)
- Stevensons Island/Te Peka Karara (in Lake Wānaka)
- Tarahanga Island (in Waikato River)
- Tawanui Island (in Waikato River delta)
- Te Kopura Island (in Waikato River)
- Te Toki Island (in Waikato River)
- Te Weranga Okapu Island (in Waikato River delta)
- Tree Island (in Lake Wakatipu)
- Whatamakiri Island (in Waikato River delta)

== Outlying ==
New Zealand administers the following islands outside the main archipelago. Only the Chatham Islands have a permanent population although others also did in the past. Others host visitors for science, conservation, meteorological observation and tourism.

- Chatham Islands
  - Chatham Island
  - Forty-Fours
  - Little Mangere Island
  - Mangere Island
  - Pitt Island
  - The Sisters
  - Rabbit Island
  - Rangatira Island
  - Star Keys
- Kermadec Islands
  - Cheeseman Island
  - Curtis Island
  - L'Esperance Rock
  - Macauley Island
  - Nugent Island
  - Raoul Island
- Solander Islands
  - Solander Island
  - Little Solander Island
  - Pierced Rock
- Manawatāwhi / Three Kings Islands
  - Manawatāwhi / Great Island
  - Oromaki / North East Island
  - Farmer Rocks
  - Moekawa / South West Island
  - Princes Islands
  - Ōhau / West Island

Topographical map of Antipodes Islands

The New Zealand Subantarctic Islands are designated as a World Heritage Site.

- Antipodes Islands
  - Antipodes Island
  - Bollons Island
- Auckland Islands
  - Adams Island
  - Auckland Island
  - Disappointment Island
  - Enderby Island
  - Ewing Island
  - Rose Island
- Bounty Islands
- Campbell Island group
  - Campbell Island
  - Dent Island
  - Folly Island (or Folly Islands)
  - Jacquemart Island
- The Snares
  - Broughton Island
  - North East Island
  - Western Chain

== Realm of New Zealand ==
The following islands are part of the Realm of New Zealand, but not of the country itself:

- Cook Islands
  - Aitutaki
  - Atiu
  - Mangaia
  - Manihiki
  - Manuae
  - Mauke
  - Mitiaro
  - Nassau
  - Palmerston Island
  - Penrhyn Island/Tongareva
  - Pukapuka
  - Rakahanga
  - Rarotonga
  - Suwarrow
  - Takutea
- Niue
- Tokelau
  - Atafu
  - Nukunonu
  - Fakaofo

== Territorial claims ==
New Zealand also claims the Ross Dependency in Antarctica, including:

- the Balleny Islands
  - Buckle Island
  - Sabrina Island
  - Sturge Island
  - Young Island
- Scott Island
- Roosevelt Island
- Coulman Island
- the Ross Archipelago
  - Ross Island
  - Beaufort Island
  - White Island
  - Black Island
  - the Dellbridge Islands
    - Inaccessible Island
    - Tent Island
    - Big Razorback
    - Little Razorback

== See also ==
- List of islands
- Geography of New Zealand
- Extreme points of New Zealand
