= Black Reef (New Zealand) =

Island in New Zealand

Geography
- Coordinates: 41.727583°S 171.470083°E

Administration
- New Zealand
- Region: West Coast

Demographics
- Population: uninhabited

Black Reef is a group of small islands off the West Coast of New Zealand. It is south of the Three Steeples.

== See also ==
- List of islands of New Zealand
