= Bombay Rock (New Zealand) =

Island in New Zealand

Geography
- Location: Invercargill
- Coordinates: 46.509997°S 168.266226°E

Administration
- New Zealand
- Region: Southland

Demographics
- Population: uninhabited

Bombay Rock is a small island in the Mokomoto Inlet of Invercargill, New Zealand.

== See also ==
- List of islands of New Zealand
