= Anchorage Island =

Anchorage Island may refer to:

- Anchorage Island (Antarctica)
- Anchorage Island (Cook Islands)
- Anchorage Island (New Zealand)
- Anchorage Island (Nunavut), Canada
