= Brazier Rock =

Island in New Zealand

- Interactive map of Brazier Rock

Geography
- Coordinates: 36.529628°S 174.728936°E

Administration
- New Zealand
- Region: Auckland

Demographics
- Population: uninhabited

Brazier Rock is an island off the east coast of the Auckland Region, New Zealand.

== See also ==
- List of islands of New Zealand
