= Black Jacks Island =

Island in New Zealand

Geography
- Coordinates: 44.534891°S 170.199528°E

Administration
- New Zealand
- Region: Otago

Demographics
- Population: uninhabited

Black Jacks Island is an island in Lake Benmore in Otago, New Zealand.

== See also ==
- List of islands of New Zealand
