= Motuoroi Island =

Māori: Motuoroi
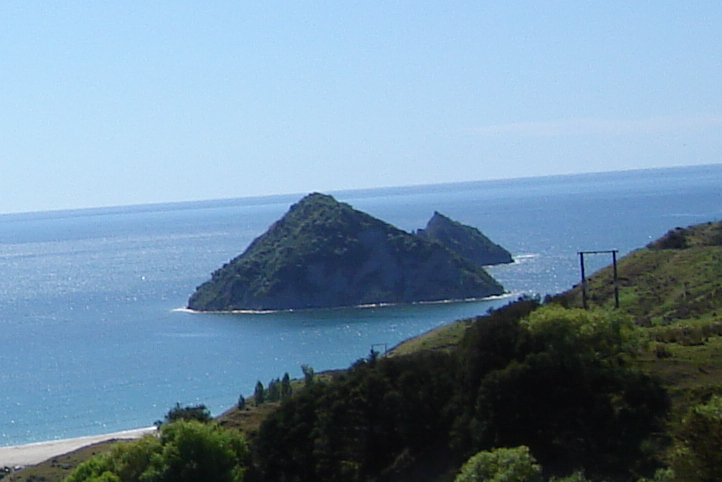
- Interactive map of Motuoroi Island

Geography
- Location: Gisborne Region
- Coordinates: 38.2486°S 178.3357°E

Administration
- New Zealand

Demographics
- Population: 0

Motuoroi Island is a small island off the northeast of New Zealand's North Island. It is located close to the small settlement of Anaura, halfway between Tolaga Bay and Tokomaru Bay.

The New Zealand Ministry for Culture and Heritage gives a translation of "island of Roi" for Motuoroi.

== See also ==
- List of islands of New Zealand
- List of islands
- Desert island
