= Chetwode Islands =

Island group in New Zealand

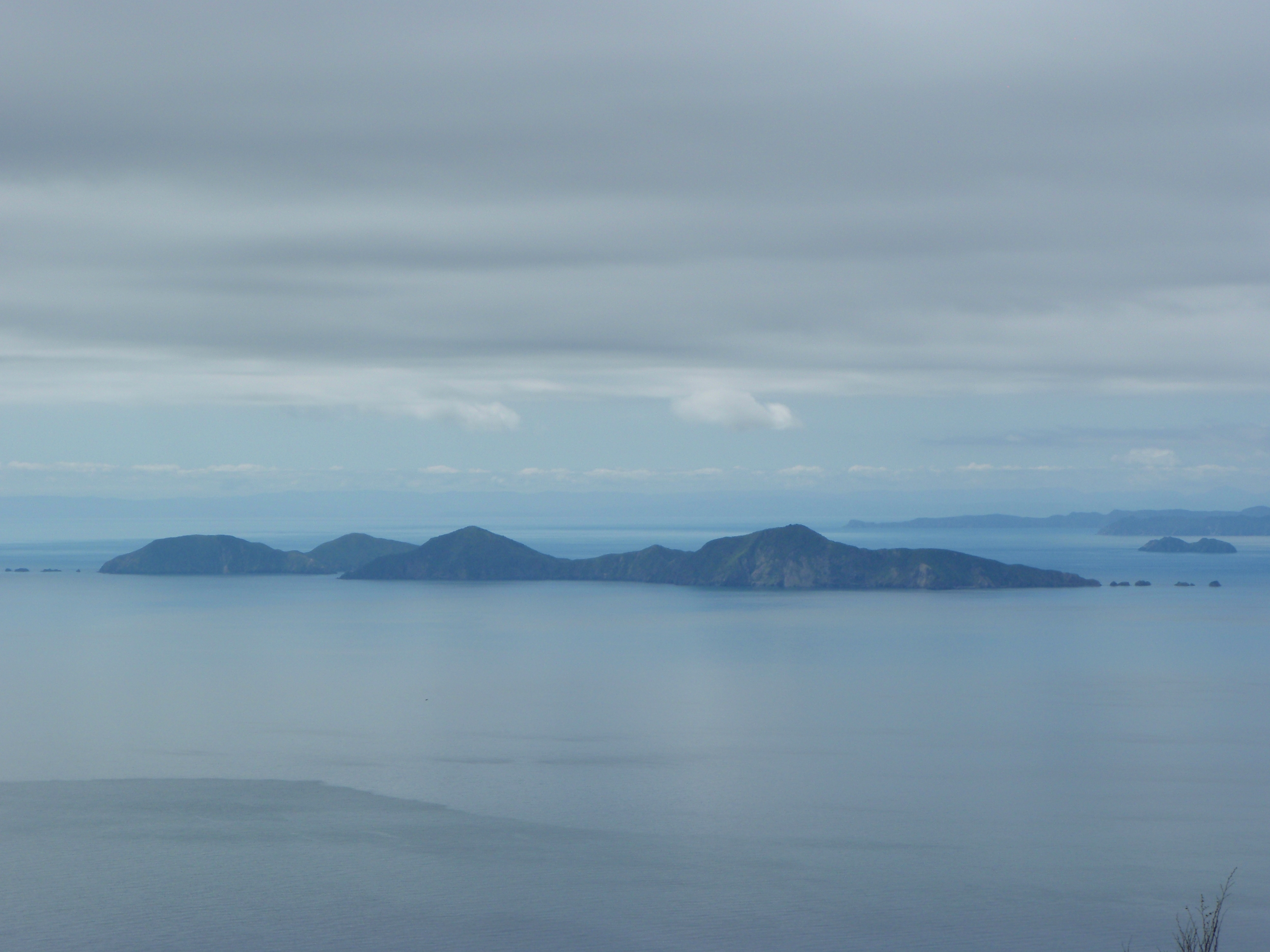
- Chetwode Islands, Marlborough Sounds
- Interactive map of Chetwode Islands

Geography
- Location: Marlborough Region
- Coordinates: 40.9°S 174.07°E
- Total islands: 4
- Major islands: 2
- Area: 3.2 km^{2} (1.2 sq mi)
- Length: 5 km (3.1 mi)
- Width: 1 km (0.6 mi)
- Highest elevation: 247 m (810 ft)

Administration
- New Zealand

Demographics
- Population: 0

The Chetwode Islands are a group of islands near the Marlborough Sounds along the northern coast of the South Island of New Zealand.

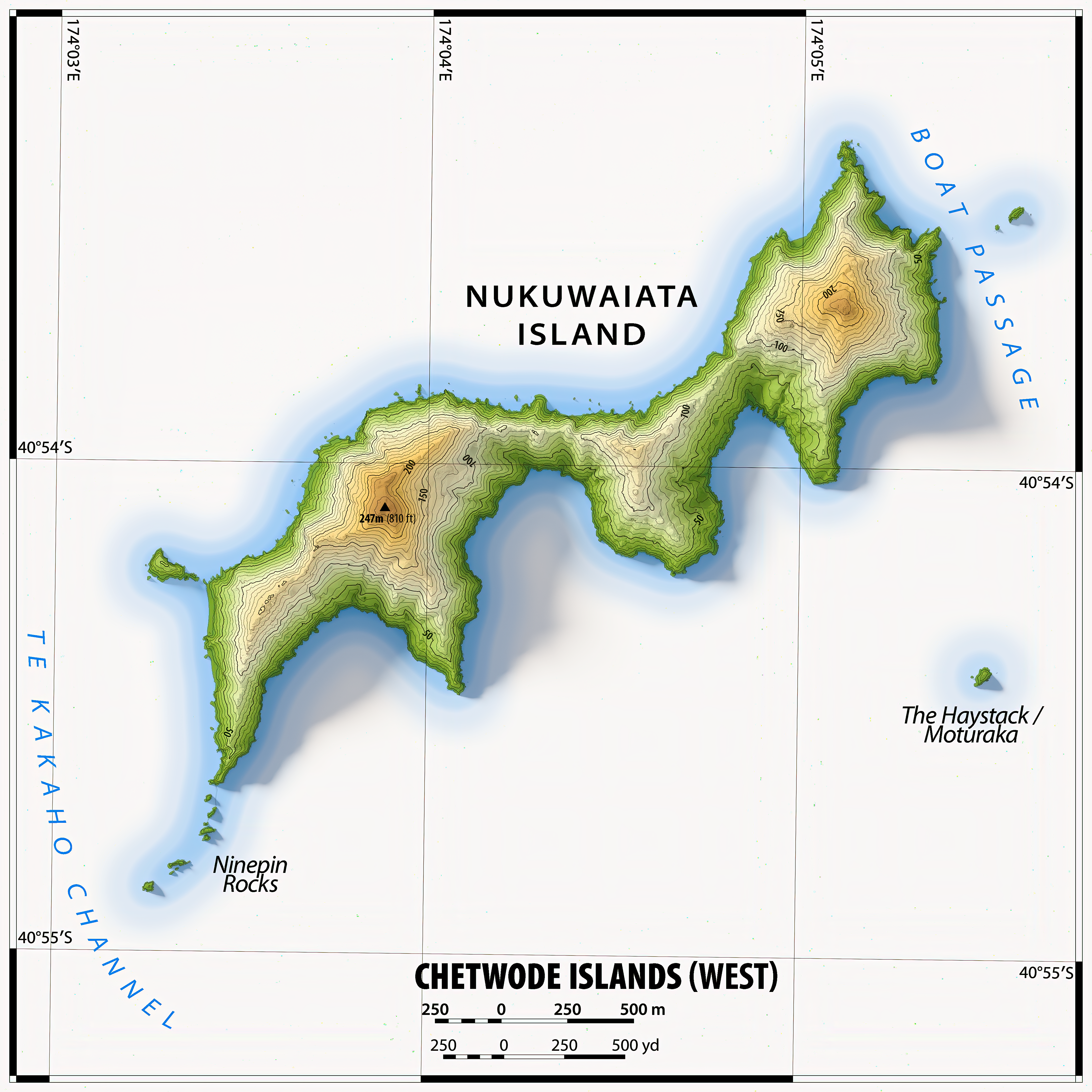
Map of the Chetwode Islands / West

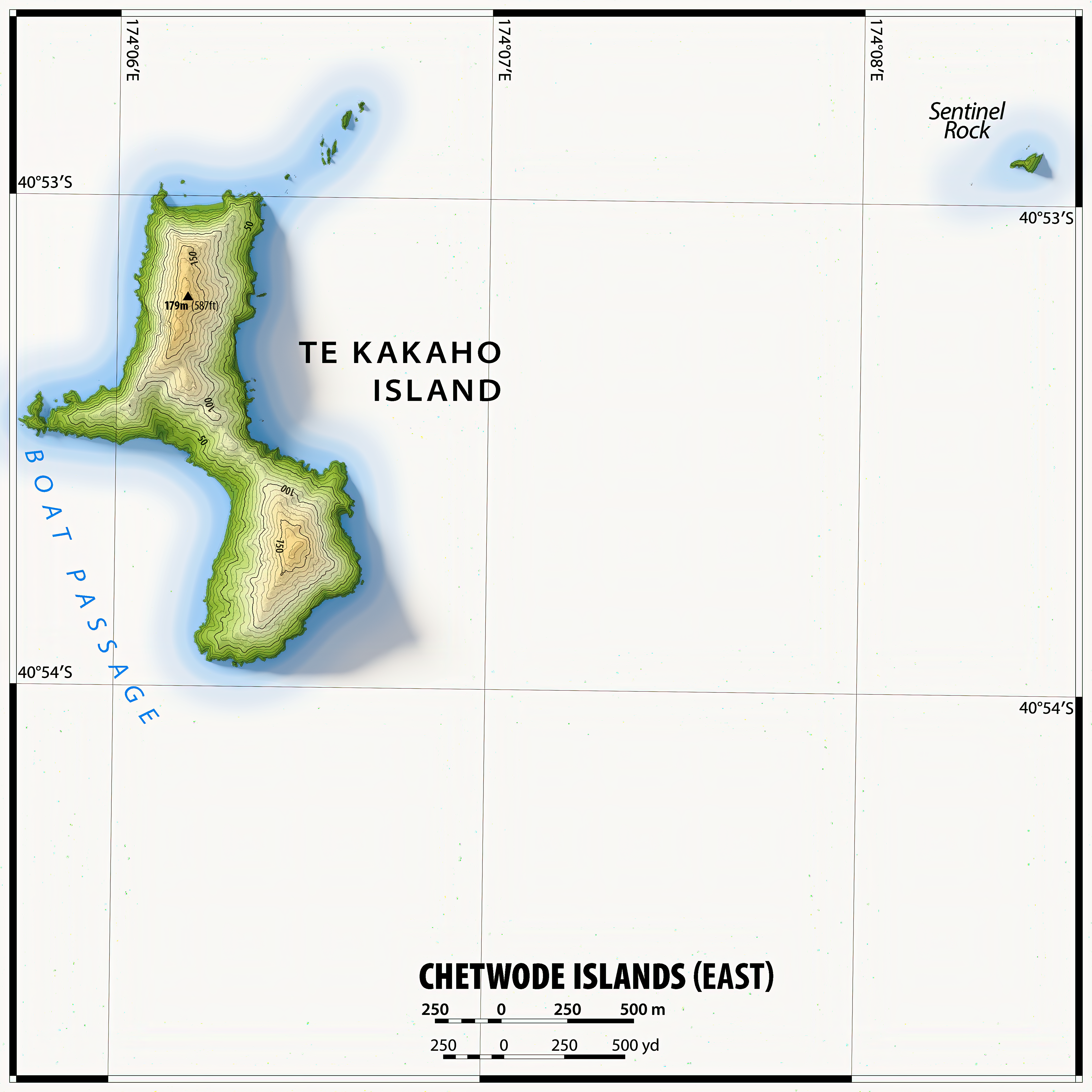
Map of the Chetwode Islands / East

The group consists of Nukuwaiata Island (to the southwest), rising to 247 m (810 ft), and Te Kakaho Island (highest elevation 179 m (587 ft)) to the northeast. The remaining islets are tiny in comparison. All 324 ha (800 acres) of the Chetwode Islands are a nature reserve.

The islands are named after Lieutenant Chetwode, acting commander of the Cruizer-class brig-sloop, HMS Pelorus in 1838.

== See also ==
- Islands of New Zealand
- List of islands
- Desert island
