= Kapiapia Rock =

Island in New Zealand

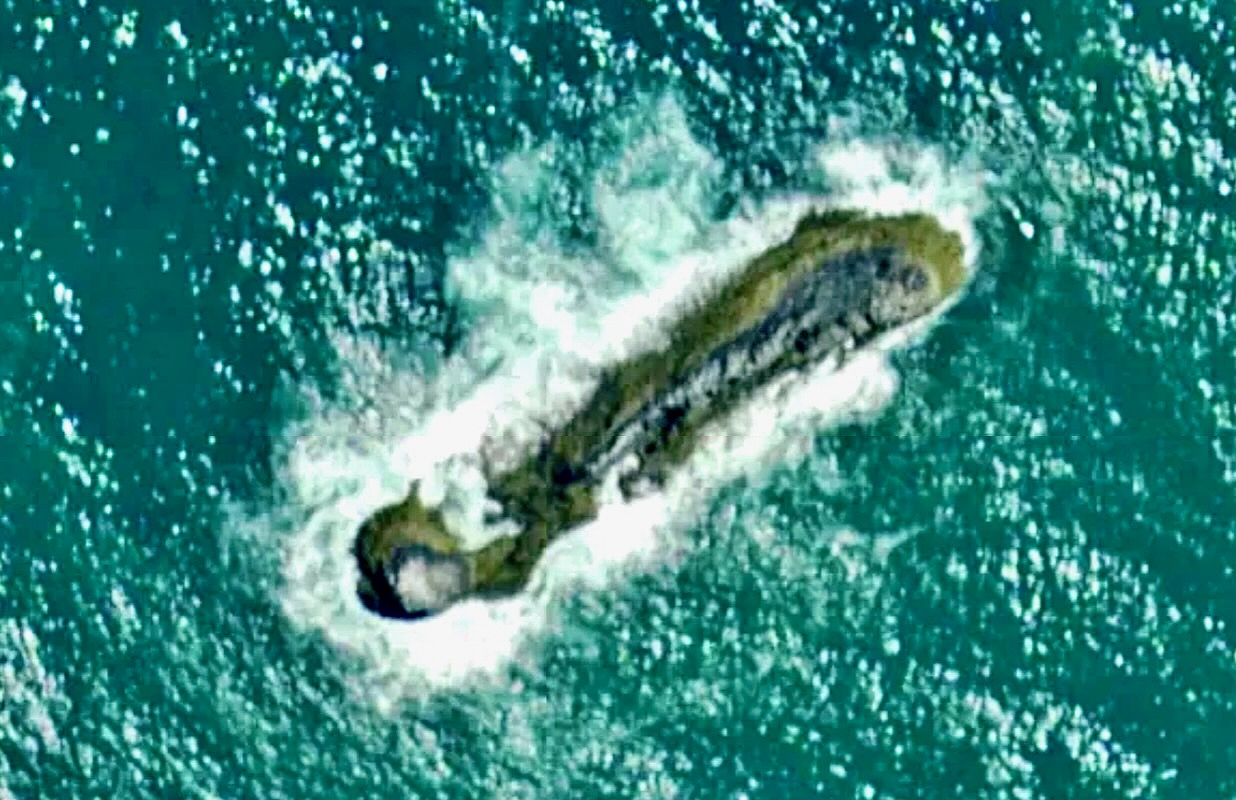
- Aerial view of Kapiapia Rock
- Interactive map of Kapiapia Rock

Geography
- Location: Tasman Sea, Waikato region
- Coordinates: 37.54030°S 174.72761°E
- Highest elevation: 17 m (56 ft)

Administration
- New Zealand

Kapiapia Rock is a tiny island about 3 kilometres (1.9 miles) offshore from Waikaretu, on the Waikato coast of New Zealand's North Island. It is less than 20 metres (66 ft) above sea level.

The rock is formed of Pliocene Ngatutura basalt, part of the Ngatutura volcanic field. The island has sometimes been called Black Rock.

Birds nesting on the rock include Black shags (kawau) Phalacrocorax carbo, Spotted shags (pārekareka) Stictacarbo punctatus, New Zealand pipit (pīhoihoi) Anthus novaeseelandiae and Dunnock (hedge sparrow) Prunella modularis and molluscs on the rock include limpets (ngakihi) Notoacmea scopulina.

The rock is associated with a legend about local weather, the brothers Rakapawhara and Te Atai-o-rongo and revenge by the latter's son, Kaihu, after a fishing trip near the rock had ended in his father's death.

== See also ==
- List of islands of New Zealand
