= Bignell Reef =

Island in New Zealand

- Interactive map of Bignell Reef

Geography
- Coordinates: 43.856069°S 168.896962°E

Administration
- New Zealand
- Region: West Coast

Demographics
- Population: uninhabited

Bignell Reef is an island in the West Coast Region of New Zealand. It lies east of the Open Bay Islands: Taumaka and Pōpōtai Island.

== See also ==
- List of islands of New Zealand
