= Forsyth Island (New Zealand) =

Island in New Zealand

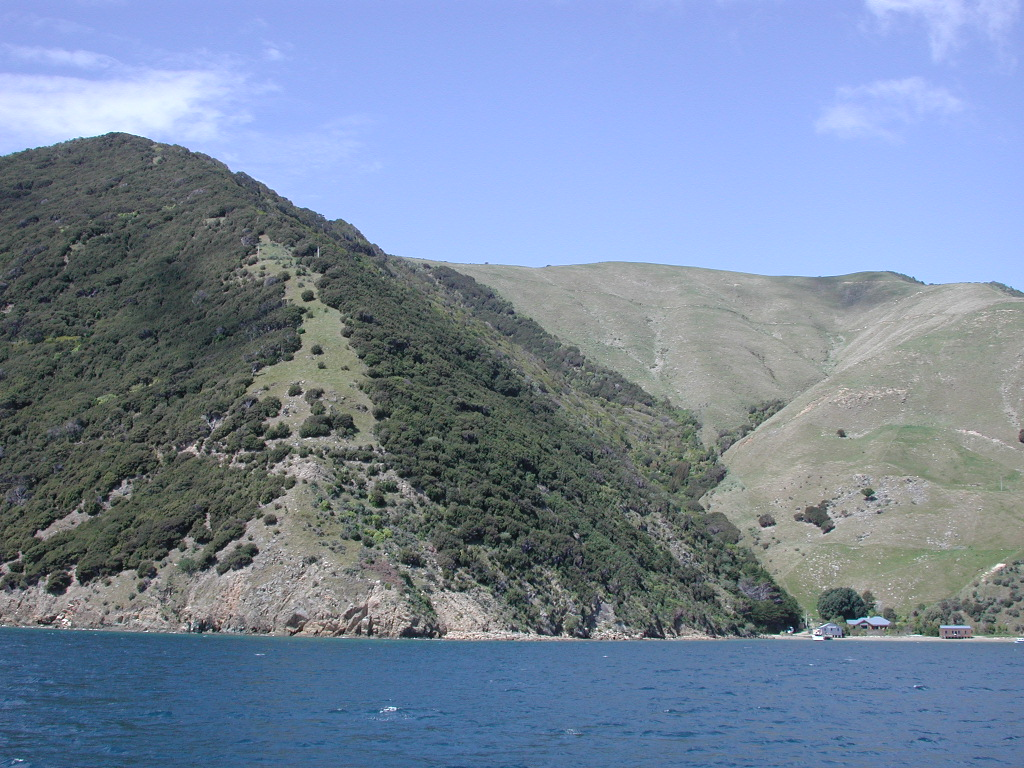
- Forsyth Island in the outer Marlborough Sounds
- Interactive map of Forsyth Island

Geography
- Location: Marlborough Sounds
- Coordinates: 40°58′20″S 174°4′0″E
- Area: 7.5 km^{2} (2.9 sq mi)
- Length: 6.5 km (4.04 mi)
- Width: 1.5 km (0.93 mi)
- Highest elevation: 356 m (1168 ft)

Administration
- New Zealand

Demographics
- Population: <10 (2012)

Forsyth Island lies in the outer Marlborough Sounds of New Zealand's South Island and is separated from the mainland by the 300m wide Allen Strait (also known as Guards Pass). The island comprises a mixture of farm land and native bush on hills rising to over 350 metres (1,148 ft) with views into the Marlborough Sounds and east towards the North Island.

As of 2012, it is one of the largest entirely privately owned islands in the South Pacific, and offers exclusive accommodation, accessible via helicopter and boat.

Forsyth Island is connected to electricity and phone via a cable across Allen Strait and is serviced weekly by a mail boat from Havelock.

== See also ==
- List of islands of New Zealand

== Sources ==
- National Geographic
- Article
- Brochure Archived 6 February 2017 at the Wayback Machine
- News report
