= Budges Island =

Island in New Zealand

Geography
- Coordinates: 41.527438°S 174.080209°E

Administration
- New Zealand
- Region: Marlborough

Demographics
- Population: uninhabited

Budges Island is an island on the east of Blenheim, New Zealand. It is north of Upper and Big Lagoon.

== See also ==
- List of islands of New Zealand
