= Arakaninihi Island =

Island in New Zealand

- Interactive map of Arakaninihi Island

Geography
- Location: Northland Region
- Coordinates: 35.718°S 174.568°E

Administration
- New Zealand

Demographics
- Population: 0

Arakaninihi Island is a small island in the Northland Region of New Zealand. It lies off Taiharuru Head, directly east of Whangārei.

== See also ==
- List of islands of New Zealand
- List of islands
- Desert island
