= Boat Passage Islands =

Islands in New Zealand

Geography
- Coordinates: 46.9645°S 168.159528°E

Administration
- New Zealand
- Region: Southland

Demographics
- Population: uninhabited

Boat Passage Islands is a group of small islands in the eastern side of Stewart Island, New Zealand.

== See also ==
- List of islands of New Zealand
