= Amerikiwhati Island =

Island in New Zealand

Māori: Amerikiwhati
- Interactive map of Amerikiwhati Island

Geography
- Location: Marlborough administrative region
- Coordinates: 41.199°S 174.2365°E

Administration
- New Zealand

Demographics
- Population: 0

Amerikiwhati Island is a small island in the Marlborough administrative region of New Zealand. It lies in Queen Charlotte Sound where it is an extension of the ridge dividing Ahitarakihi Bay from Waikakaramea Bay on Arapaoa Island. The island measures approximately 300 metres by 70 metres.

== See also ==
- List of islands of New Zealand
- List of islands
- Desert island
