= Aroha Island =

Island in New Zealand

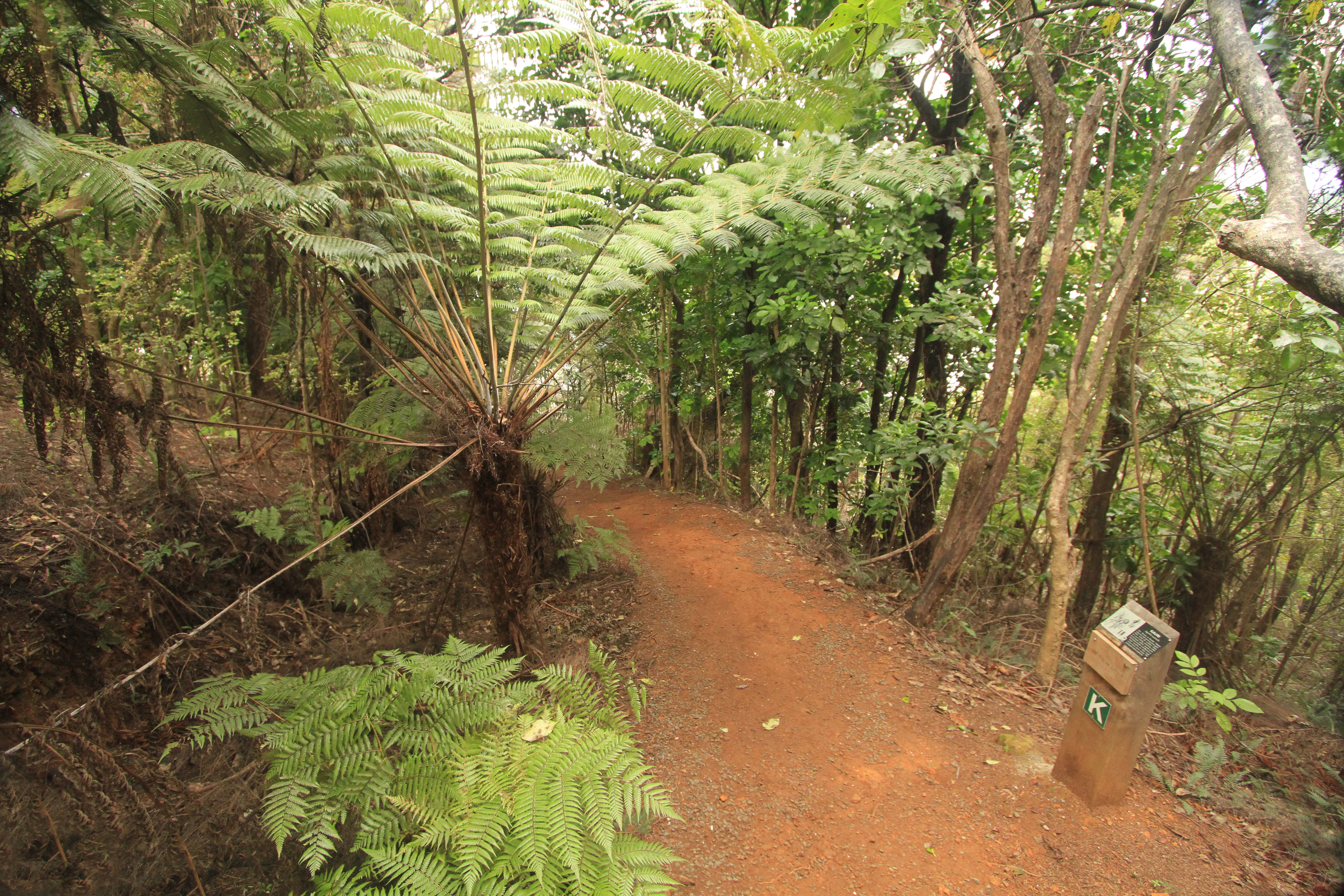
- Aroha Island Ecological Centre

Geography
- Location: Northland Region
- Coordinates: 35.1937°S 174.0069°E

Administration
- New Zealand

Demographics
- Population: 0

Aroha Island is a small island near Rangitane, which is about 12 km (7.5 mi) by road from Kerikeri in the Kerikeri Inlet, Bay of Islands, Northland, New Zealand. The island covers an area of 12 ha. It is owned and managed by the Queen Elizabeth II National Trust and is a major habitat for the North Island brown kiwi. It is linked to the mainland via a causeway. The island serves as an ecological centre.

== See also ==
- List of islands of New Zealand
- List of islands
- Desert island
