= Bull and Cow Islands =

Islands of New Zealand

Geography
- Location: Stewart Island
- Coordinates: 47.162257°S 167.545072°E

Administration
- New Zealand
- Region: Southland

Demographics
- Population: uninhabited

The Bull and Cow Islands, or Cow and Bull Islands is a group of islands in on the south west of Stewart Island / Rakiura, New Zealand.

== See also ==
- List of islands of New Zealand
