= Spirit of the Dawn (ship) =

British iron barque built in 1869

History

United Kingdom
- Owner: J. Bell and Son
- Port of registry: Liverpool
- Builder: T. R. Oswald and Co.
- Launched: 1869
- Fate: Wrecked on 4 September 1893

General characteristics
- Tonnage: 692 tons
- Sail plan: Barque

Spirit of the Dawn was a British 692-ton iron barque that wrecked in the Antipodes Islands on 4 September 1893. She was built at Sunderland in 1869 by T. R. Oswald and Co. and owned by J. Bell and Son of Liverpool.

== Wreck and rescue ==
On 4 September 1893, Spirit of the Dawn was en route from Rangoon, Burma, to Talcahuano, Chile, with a cargo of rice and under the command of Captain R. T. Millington. The ship encountered foggy weather in the Southern Ocean, struck rocks and sank, half a mile from the Antipodes Islands. Eleven of the crew took the boats and made it ashore but five other crew, including the captain, drowned.

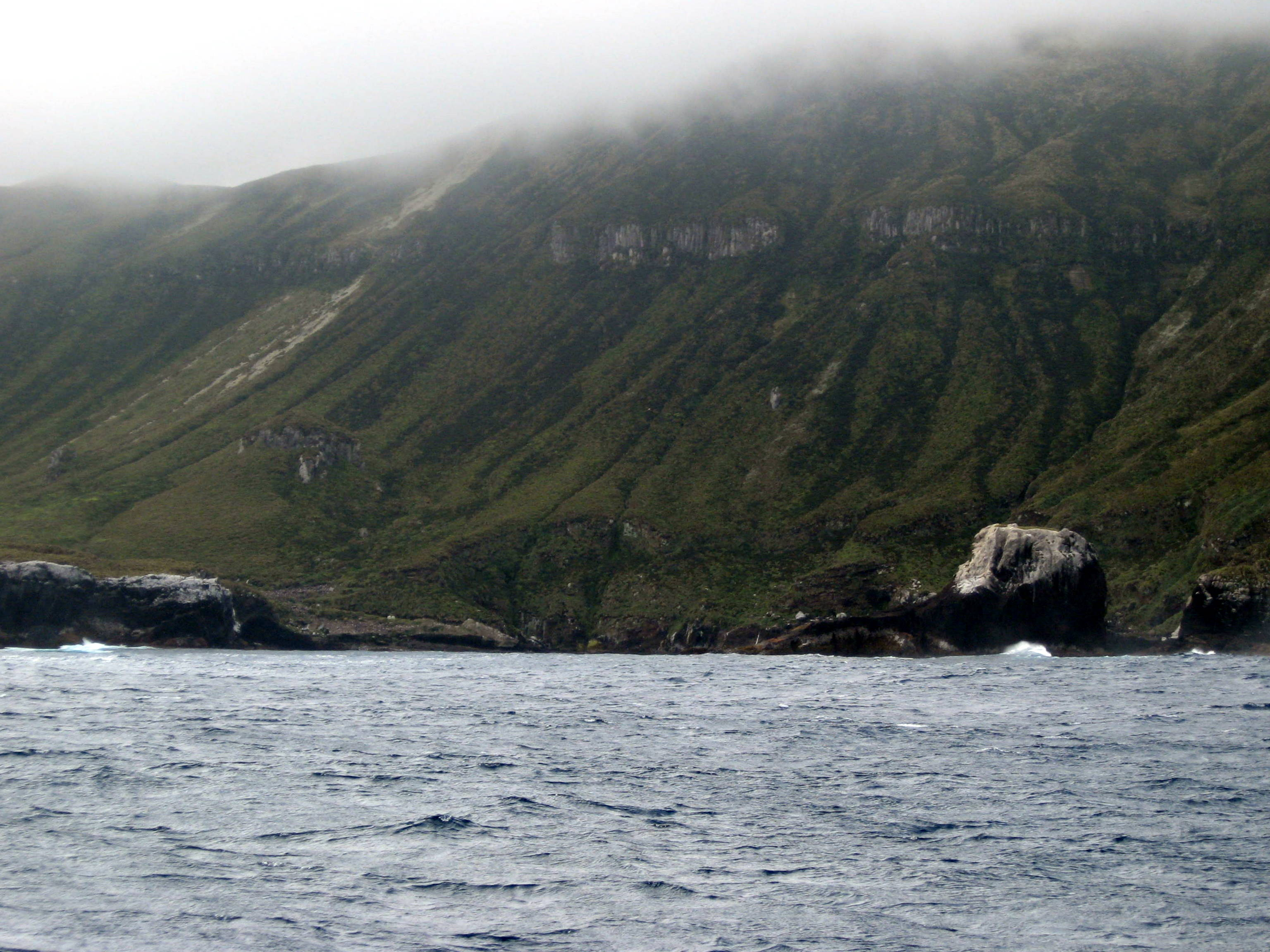
Spirit of the Dawn's survivors landed at South Bay

The survivors lived on the archipelago's main island until they were rescued on 30 November, 88 days later, by NZGSS Hinemoa under the command of Captain Fairchild. The castaways lived through the entire ordeal without managing to light a fire once and survived eating raw eggs, birds, and roots. A castaway depot had been cached on the island, but the survivors never found it.

The castaways were described as being in a "desperate state" by their rescuers. One crewmember, Felix Hewbert, required hospital treatment for frostbite on his right foot. He lost two toes and the first joint of the other toes from that foot. An enquiry was held in Wellington on 11 December, before the Resident Magistrate and Captain Adams. The court held that there was no evidence to show how the ship came to be in that position and that all hands had done what they could to save lives.

=== Crew ===
The ships crew:

- Robert T. Millington, captain – drowned
- R. H. Horner, chief officer
- J. Morrissey, second officer
- Harry Davies, third officer
- E. M. Bergthiem, apprentice
- W. Clementson, apprentice
- Cetti, steward – drowned
- J. Petersen, carpenter – drowned
- John J. Peers, able seaman
- Thomas E. Ballard, able seaman
- Bernhard V. Anderson, able seaman
- C. D. Mason, able seaman
- Frank McLaughlin, able seaman
- Felix Hewbert, able seaman
- Frank Vautier, able seaman – drowned
- Peter Dawson, cook – drowned
