= Star Keys =

Motuhope (Māori) Motchu Hopo (Moriori)
- Map showing location of Star Keys

Geography
- Coordinates: 44.2217°S 176.003°W
- Archipelago: Chatham Islands

Administration
- New Zealand

The Star Keys (Māori: Motuhope; Moriori: Motchu Hopo) are group of five rocky islets in the Chatham Archipelago, about 12 kilometres (7 mi) east of Pitt Island. The archipelago is part of New Zealand, whose South Island lies 800 kilometres (497 mi) to the west.

The largest of the Star Keys is Round Islet.

== See also ==
- List of islands of New Zealand
- List of islands
- Desert island
