= Rangitoto Islands =

Island group of New Zealand

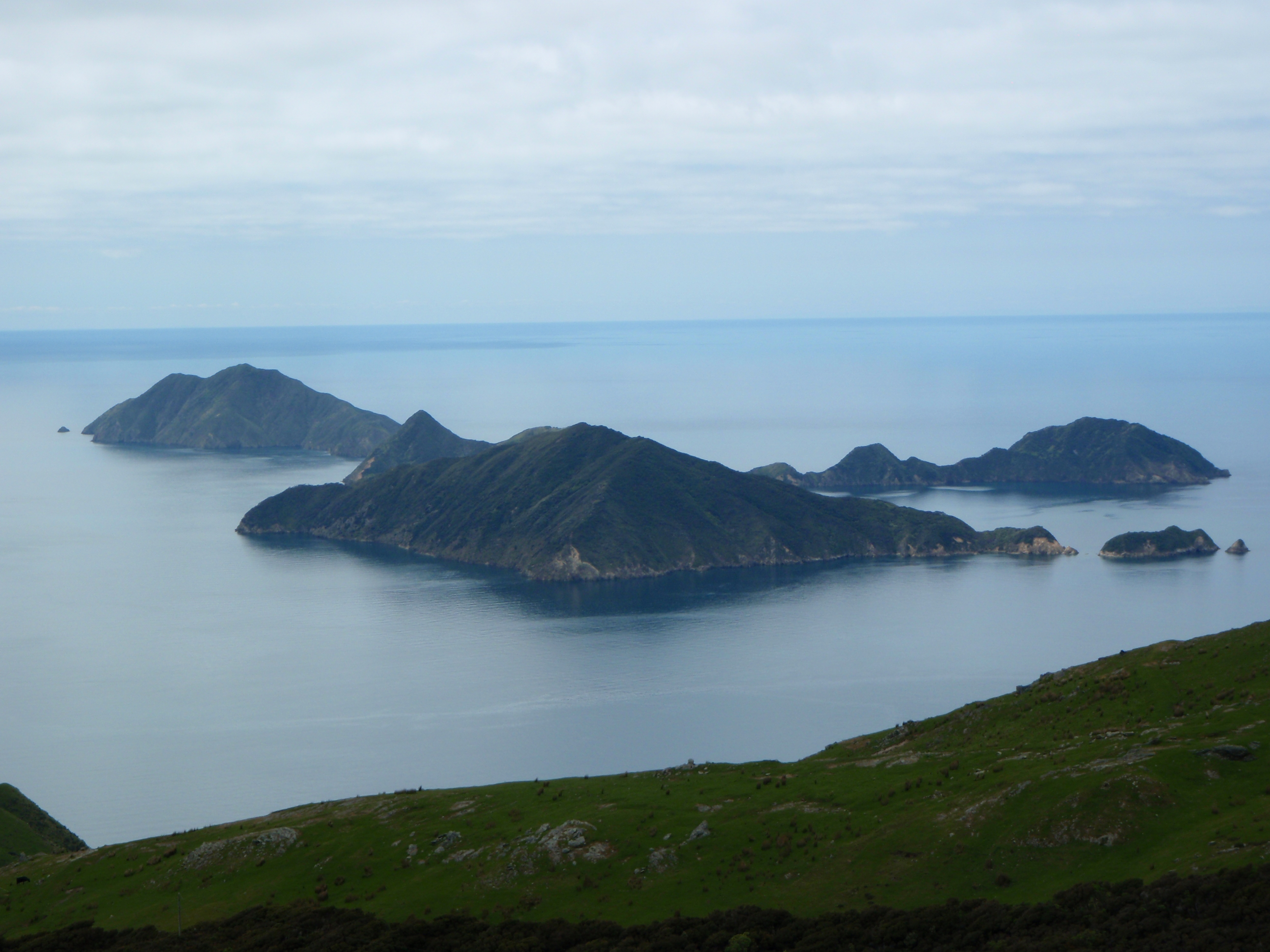
- Rangitoto Islands as seen from D'Urville Island

Geography
- Location: Marlborough Region
- Coordinates: 40.7674°S 173.9822°E
- Highest elevation: 225 m (738 ft)

Administration
- New Zealand

Demographics
- Population: 0

The Rangitoto Islands are a group of islands near the Marlborough Sounds along the northern coast of the South Island of New Zealand.

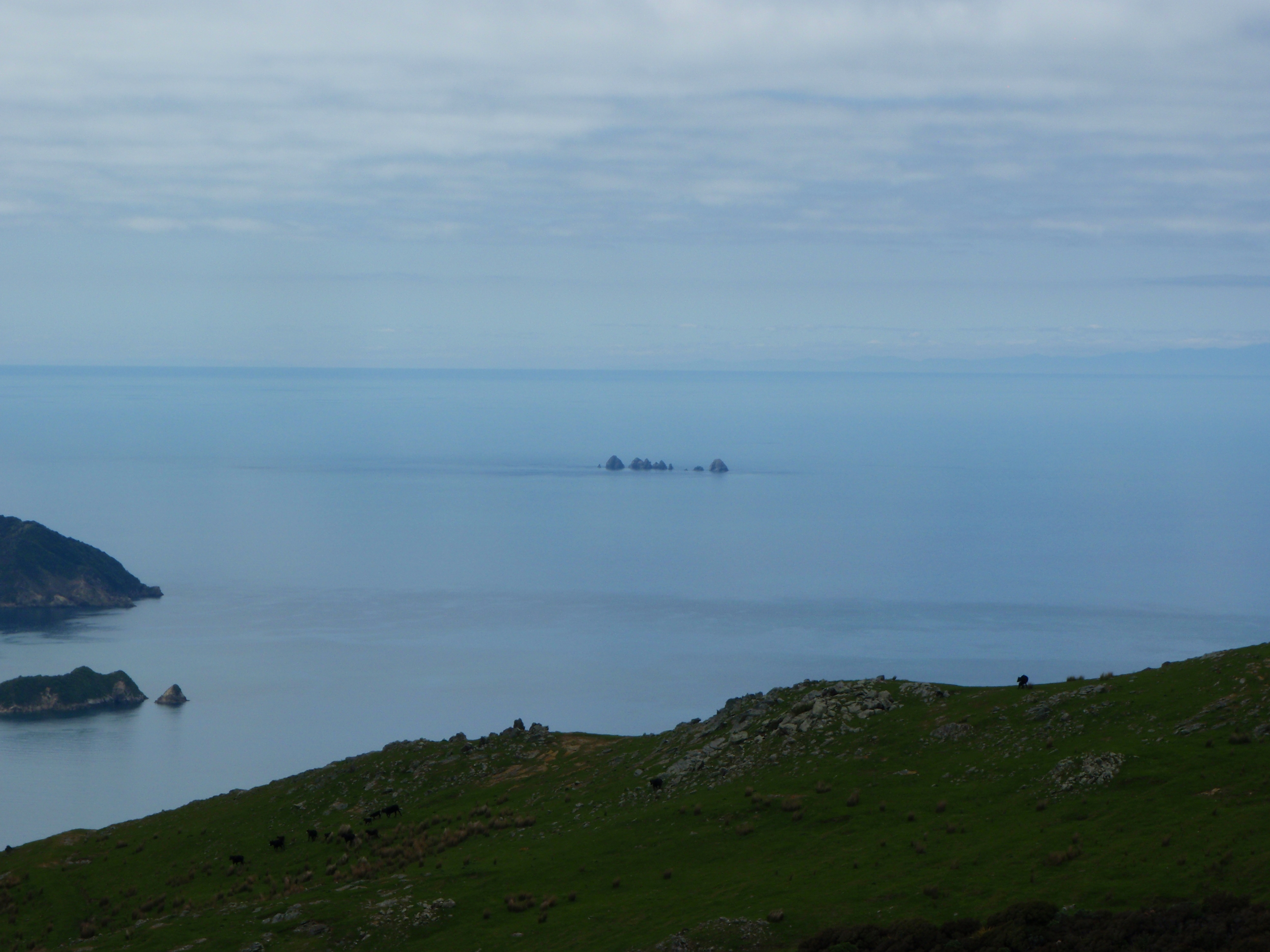
Jag Rocks (centre) to the east of Rangitoto Islands (left)

The group consists of Wakaterepapanui Island (225 m (738 ft) high), Tinui Island (190 m (620 ft) high) and Puangiangi Island (150 m (490 ft) high).

From 1957 Puangiangi Island was inhabited solely by Ross Webber, who recently sold it.

== See also ==
- Islands of New Zealand
- List of islands
- Desert island
