= Bishop and Clerks Islands =

Island in New Zealand

Geography
- Coordinates: 46.673507°S 167.804943°E

Administration
- New Zealand
- Region: Southland

Demographics
- Population: uninhabited

The Bishop and Clerks Islands or the Clerks or White Rocks are a group of about 10 islands north of Stewart Island, New Zealand.

== See also ==
- List of islands of New Zealand
