= Beehive Island / Taungamaro Island =

Island in New Zealand

Native name: Taungamaro
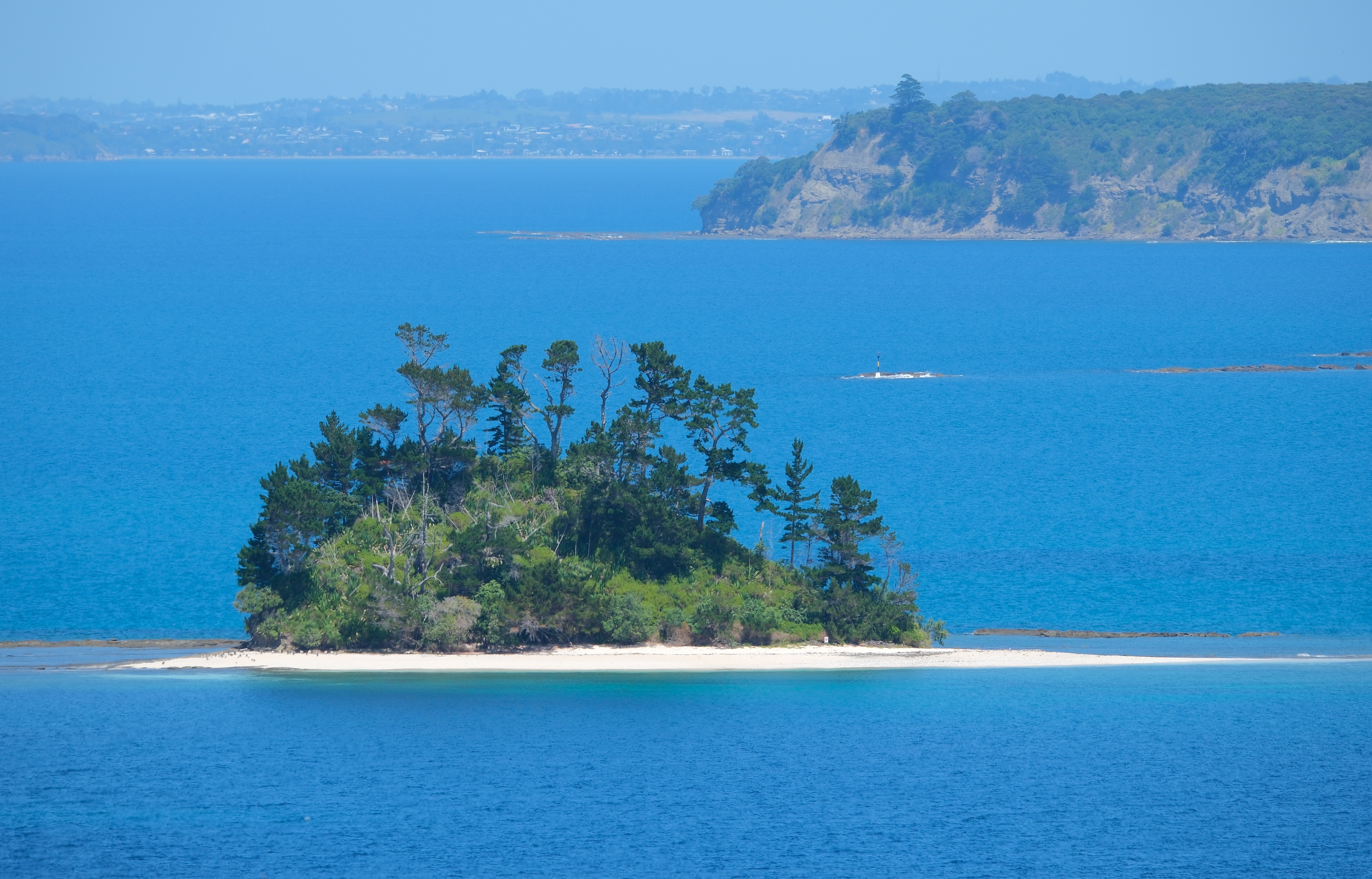
- Beehive Island / Taungamaro Island seen from Kawau Island
- Interactive map of Beehive Island / Taungamaro Island

Geography
- Location: Auckland
- Coordinates: 36.451826°S 174.821116°E
- Adjacent to: Hauraki Gulf
- Area: 5.7 ha (14 acres)
- Length: 117 m (384 ft)
- Width: 80 m (260 ft)
- Highest elevation: 10 m (30 ft)

Administration
- New Zealand
- Region: Auckland

Beehive Island / Taungamaro Island is an island in the Hauraki Gulf of New Zealand. It sits southwest of Kawau Island.

== Geography ==
Beehive Island / Taungamaro Island is located off the southwestern coast of Kawau Island. The Rosario Channel separates the island from Kawau, and the South Channel separates the island from Motuketekete Island to the southwest.

== Biodiversity ==
The island is one of the few Hauraki Gulf islands that are free of invasive pests, such as rats, mice, plague skinks or Argentine ants.

== History ==
The Beehive Island Recreation Reserve was established on the island in 2009.

== See also ==
- List of islands of New Zealand
