= Whatitirinui Island =

Island in Whāingaroa Harbour, New Zealand

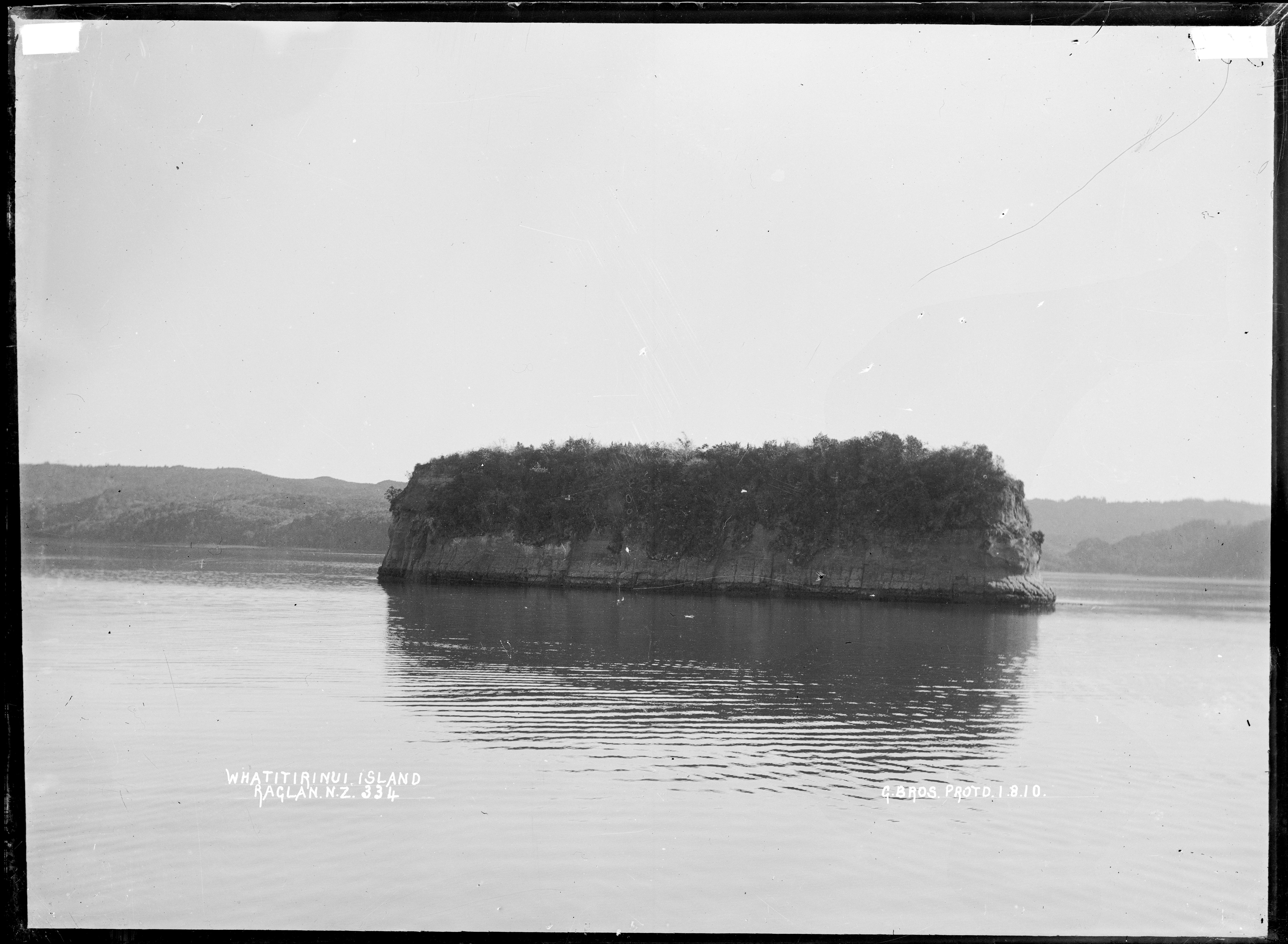
- 1910 Gilmour Brothers photo of Whatitirinui Island
- Interactive map of Whatitirinui Island
- Nearest city: Raglan
- Coordinates: 37.764°S 174.922°E
- Max. elevation: 30 ft (9.1 m)

Whatitirinui Island is a small island in the Whāingaroa Harbour, north of Paritata Peninsula and less than a kilometre west of Te Teko Island. It is about 5 km (3.1 mi) north of Raglan.

== Ownership ==
The island is referred to in the Iwi Environmental Management Plan of Ngāti Tamainupō and Tainui Awhiro and Ngāti Māhanga also have interests in Whāingaroa Harbour, which are being considered by the Waitangi Tribunal.

== Name ==
Whatitirinui Island is the New Zealand Geographic Board official name, the origin of which is unknown. The Board say it has also been called Watatounui Island and in 1880 it was described as Tawata, a very small island, some 30 ft (9.1 m) high. It was sometimes also called Sugar Loaf. Whatitiri is one of the Māori names for Pomaderris phylicifolia and nui translates as large. Pomaderris is a threatened – nationally critical, flowering shrub, growing up to 1.5 m (4 ft 11 in) high, which prefers poor, dry, soils and is shaded out in forests. In 1959 it was recorded on the nearby Motukokako Reserve.

== Geology ==
Like most of the surrounding headlands, Whatitirinui Island is mainly formed of Mangiti sandstone, a hard calcareous fine to medium sandstone and lesser siltstone deposited in beds of roughly decimetre thickness, laid on a deepening mid to outer shelf in the Whaingaroan age, about 40 million years ago.

On top of the sandstone is the much more recent Whakarau Formation, inferred to be mid to late Haweran, which is about 30,000 years old. It has fossils of macrofauna which still live in the harbour, including Austrovenus stutchburyi, Cyclomactra tristis, Dosinia lambata and Zeacumantus. The formation was formed in a flooded harbour, due to a rise in sea level following the late Pleistocene glaciation.

== Environment ==
A site on the mudflats, near Whatitirinui Island, has been sampled quarterly since 2001 for macrofauna and sediment chemistry. Results indicate macrofauna have been moderately affected by mud, with scores generally between 3 and 4, on a scale of 1 (best) to 6 (worst). Heavy metal levels have been very low. Of the six sites monitored in Whāingaroa Harbour, it is generally in the top two for healthy macrofauna.

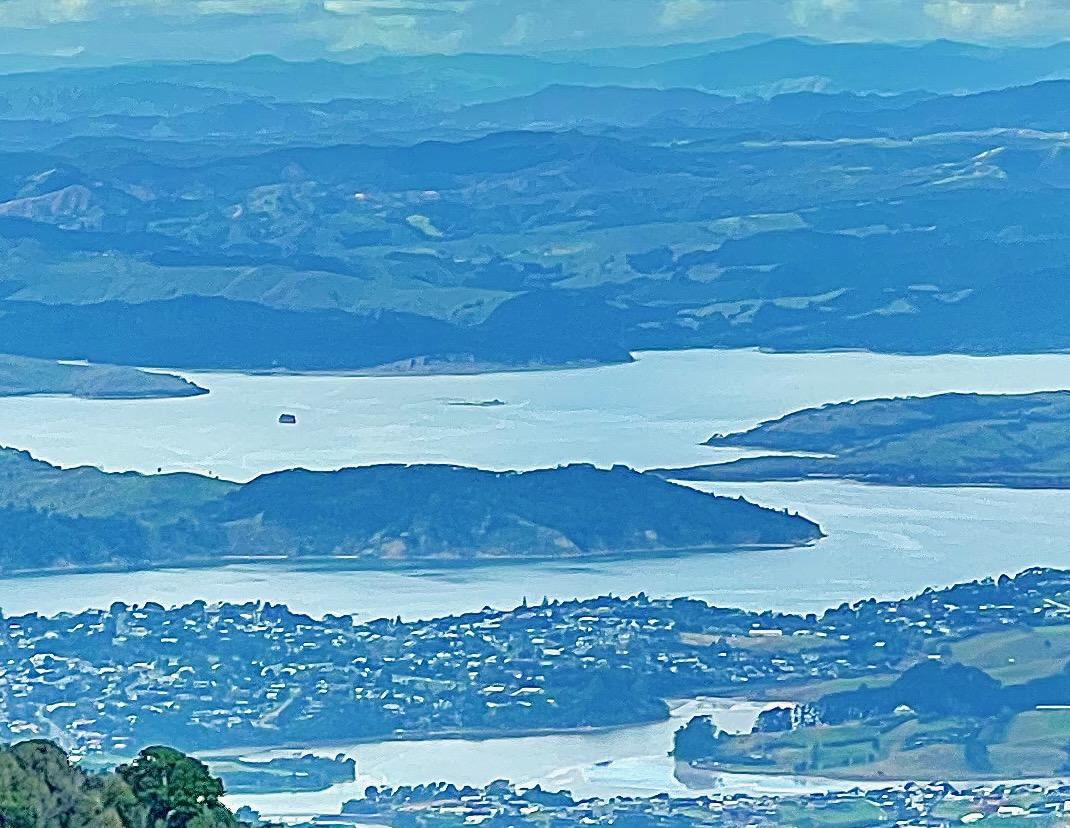
Whatitirinui viewed from Karioi (left in the northern arm of the harbour)

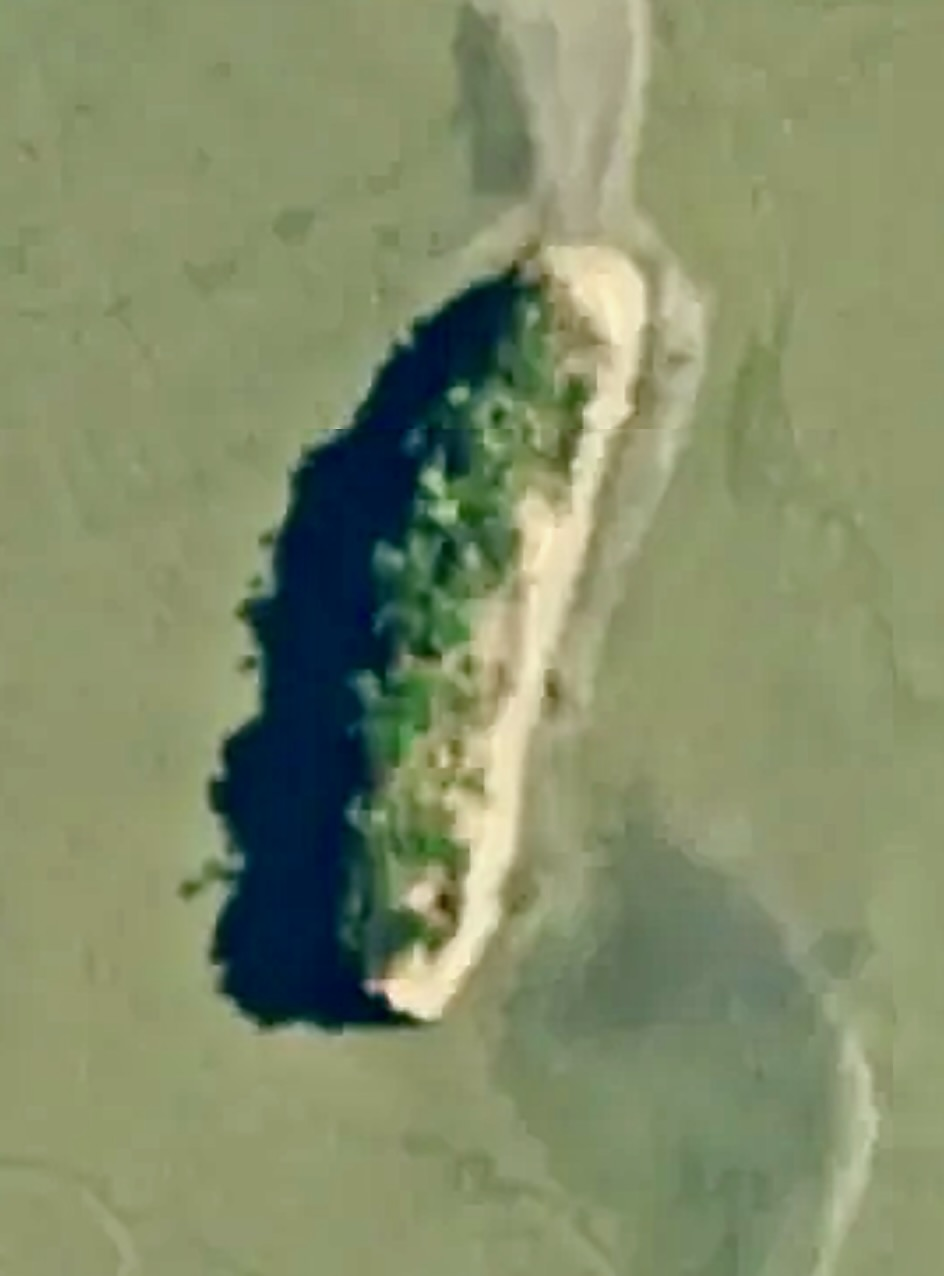
Whatitirinui aerial view

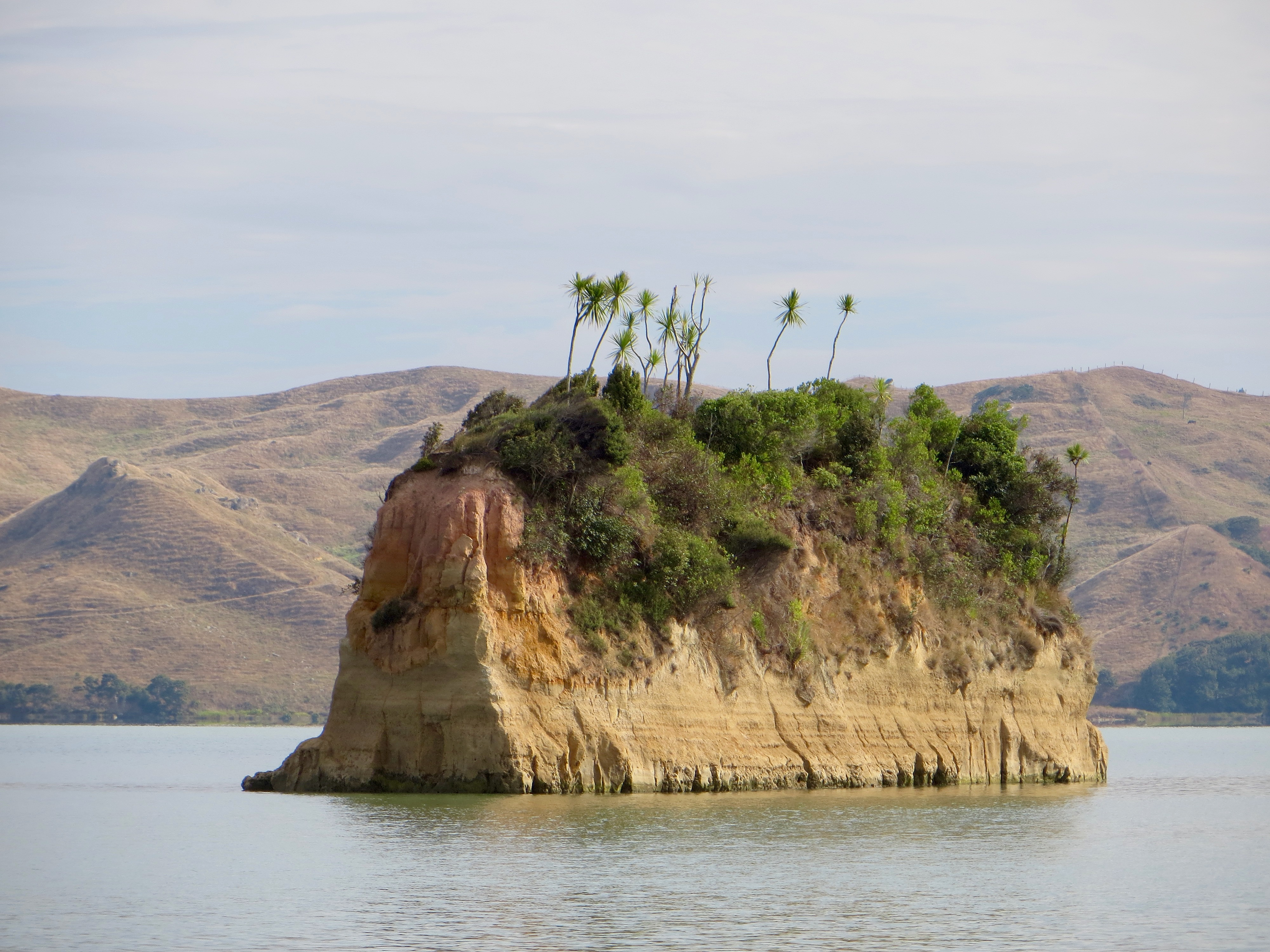
Whatitirinui from east

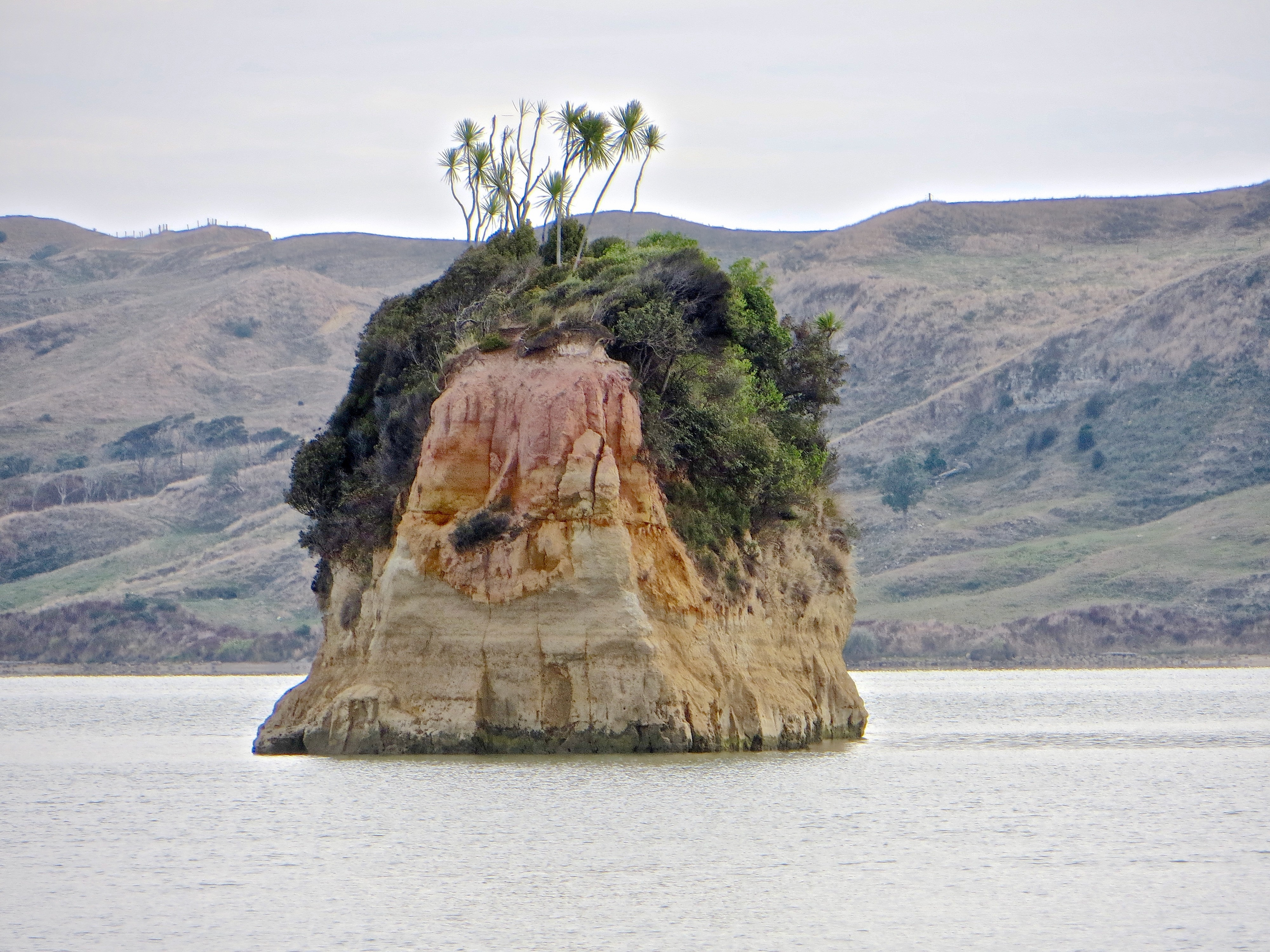
Whatitirinui from south

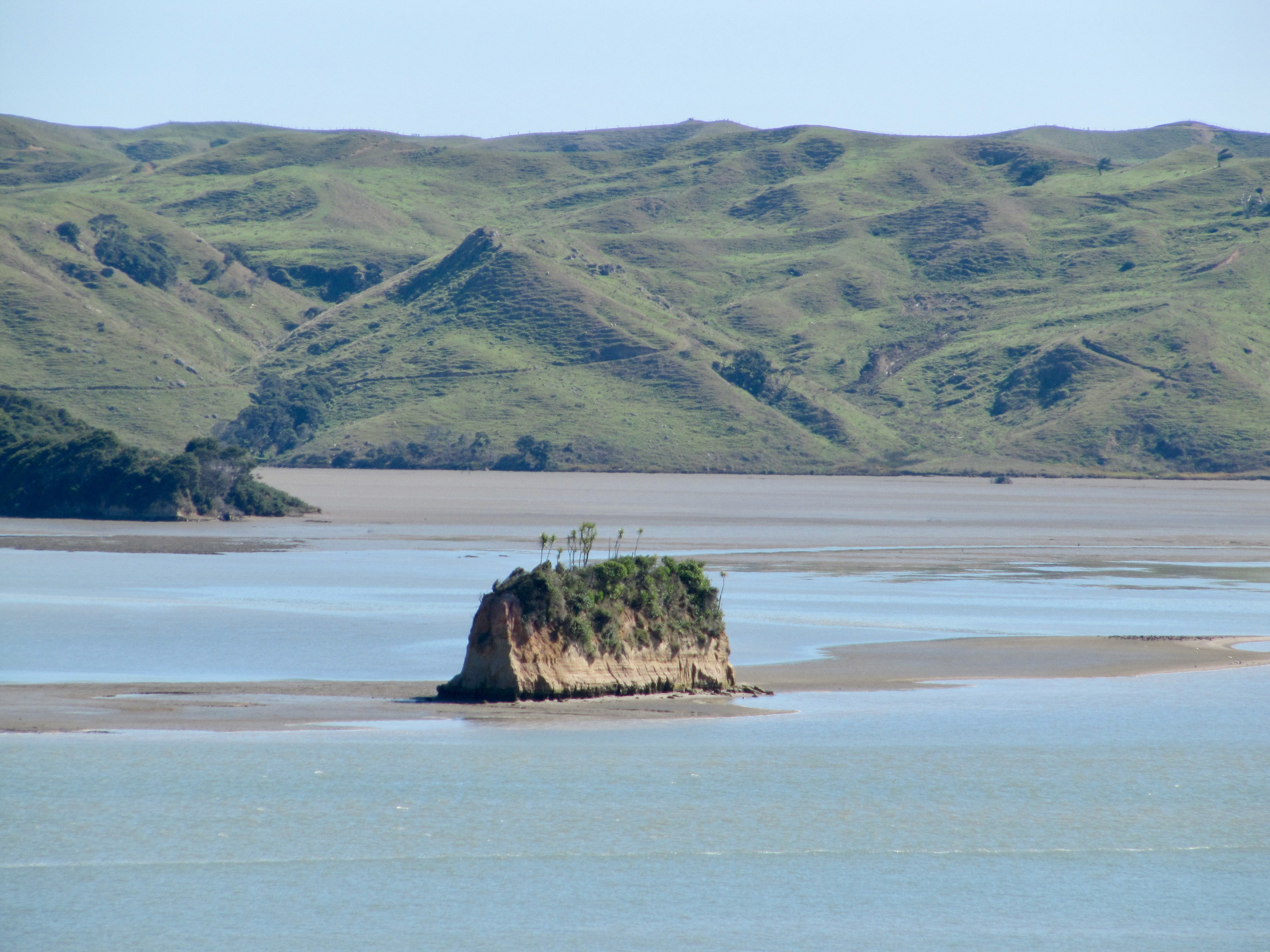
Whatitirinui from Paritata

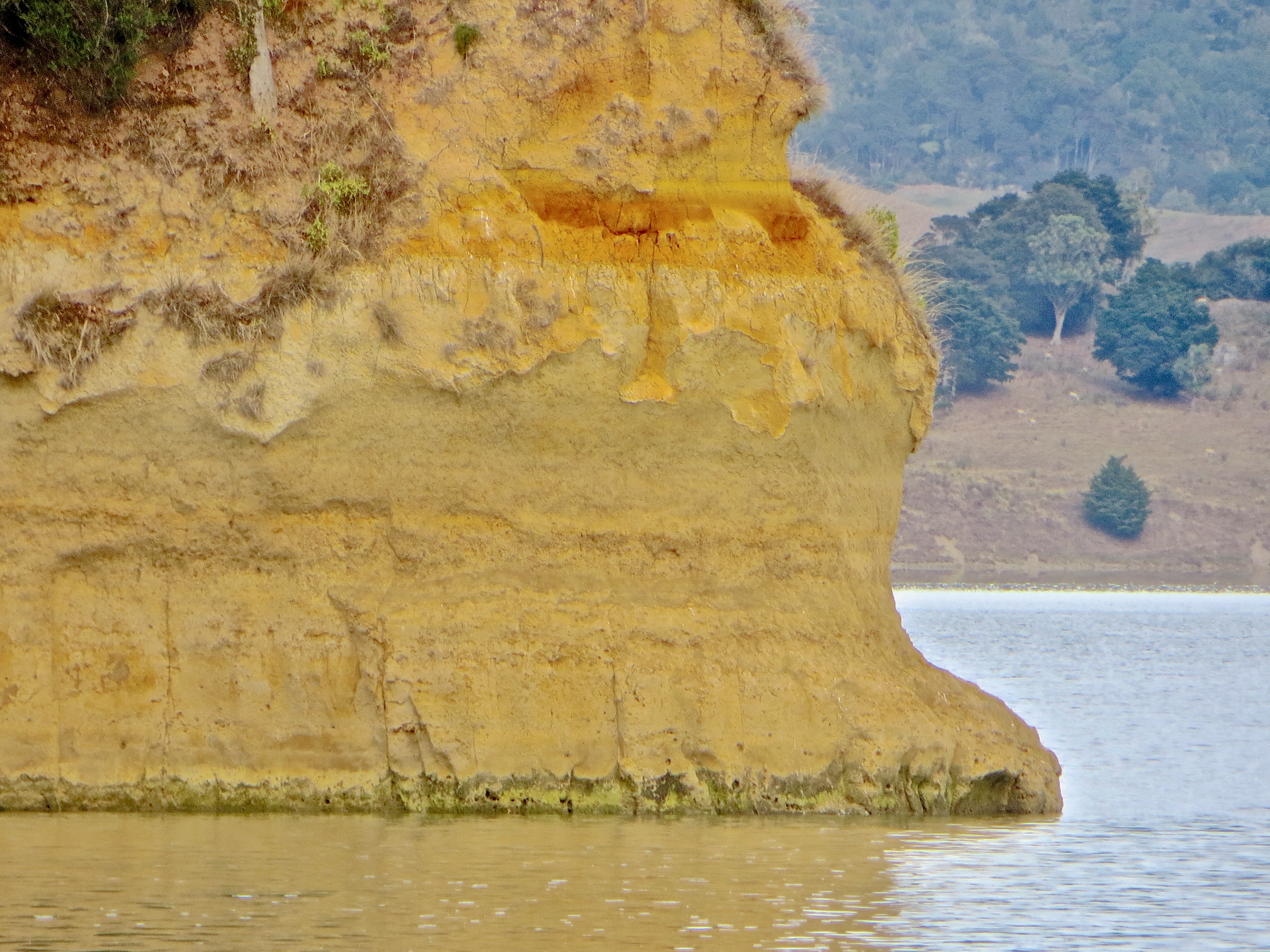
Whatitirinui north end

== See also ==
- List of islands of New Zealand
