= Bland Rocks =

Islands in New Zealand

Geography
- Coordinates: 35.391355°S 174.356638°E

Administration
- New Zealand
- Region: Northland

Demographics
- Population: uninhabited

The Bland Rocks are about three islands in Northland, New Zealand. They are between the Oakura and Whangaruru Bays.

== See also ==
- List of islands of New Zealand
