= Blue Gum Island =

Island in New Zealand

Geography
- Location: Stewart Island
- Coordinates: 46.908705°S 168.045015°E

Administration
- New Zealand
- Region: Southland

Demographics
- Population: uninhabited

Blue Gum Island is an island off the coast of Stewart Island, New Zealand. It is off the coast of Swains Beach.

== See also ==
- List of islands of New Zealand
