= Anatakupu Island =

Island in New Zealand

Rabbit Island
- Interactive map of Anatakupu Island

Geography
- Location: Marlborough District
- Coordinates: 40.896667°S 173.870000°E

Administration
- New Zealand

Anatakupu Island is an island in the Marlborough District of New Zealand. A navigational beacon is proposed for the island for sailors travelling along French Pass.

== See also ==
- List of islands of New Zealand
- List of islands
- Desert island
