= Buncrana Island =

Island in New Zealand

- Interactive map of Buncrana Island

Geography
- Coordinates: 45.479851°S 167.555251°E

Administration
- New Zealand
- Region: Southland

Demographics
- Population: uninhabited

Buncrana Island, or Te Hauhau is an island in Lake Manapouri of Southland, New Zealand. It was named in around 1877 after Buncrana the homeplace of a person named William Samuel Mitchell in County Donegal, Ireland.

== See also ==
- List of islands of New Zealand
