= Boom Rock =

Island in New Zealand

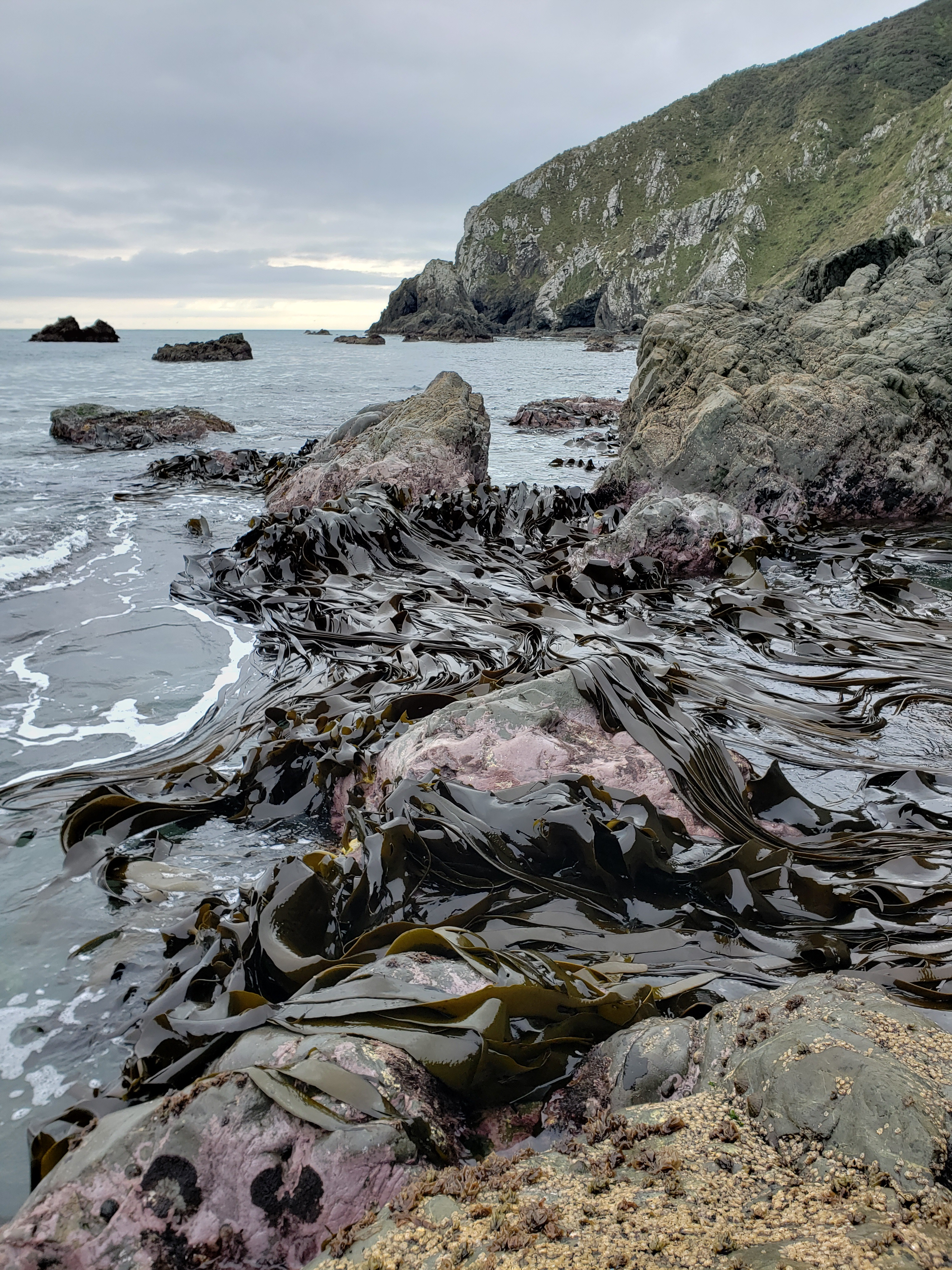
- Boom Rock
- Interactive map of Boom Rock

Geography
- Coordinates: 41.176528°S 174.739167°E

Administration
- New Zealand
- Region: Wellington

Demographics
- Population: uninhabited

Boom Rock is a small island off the west coast of the Wellington Region, New Zealand.

== See also ==
- List of islands of New Zealand
