= Belle Vue Island =

Island in New Zealand

Geography
- Location: Fiordland
- Coordinates: 45.534923°S 167.545738°E

Administration
- New Zealand
- Region: Southland

Demographics
- Population: uninhabited

Belle Vue Island is an island in Lake Manapouri in Fiordland, New Zealand.

== See also ==
- List of islands of New Zealand
