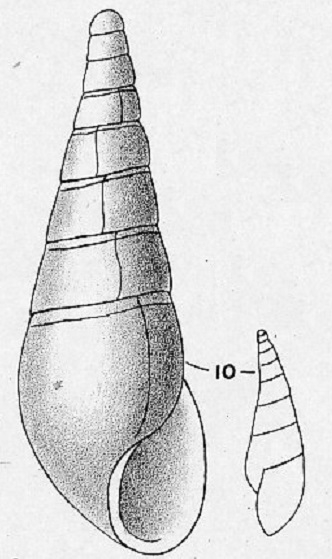
- Shell of Melanella aucklandica (original image)

Scientific classification
- Kingdom: Animalia
- Phylum: Mollusca
- Class: Gastropoda
- Subclass: Caenogastropoda
- Order: Littorinimorpha
- Family: Eulimidae
- Genus: Melanella
- Species: M. aucklandica

Binomial name
- Melanella aucklandica (Suter, 1909)

Synonyms
- Eulima aucklandica Suter, 1909 (superseded combination)

= Melanella aucklandica =

Species of gastropod

Melanella aucklandica is a species of sea snail, a marine gastropod mollusk in the family Eulimidae. The species is one of many species known to exist within the genus, Melanella.

== Description ==
The length of the shell attains 6.5 mm, its diameter 2.5 mm.

(Original description) The small shell is subulate and slightly curved forwards. It is white, smooth, and glossy, with no sculpture apart from very fine growth lines and rather inconspicuous, discontinuous varices. The red remains of the animal show through the upper whorls, giving them a faint reddish hue. The spire is slightly curved forwards and is approximately twice as high as the aperture.

The protoconch is globular. The shell consists of eight whorls that increase gradually in size and are only faintly convex. The body whorl is slightly flattened below the suture but becomes convex at the periphery and across the base. The suture is superficial and bordered below by a white band.

The aperture is pyriform and subvertical, angled above, regularly arched, and somewhat effuse below. The peristome is sharp and simple; the outer lip is only very slightly convex and projects forwards slightly at the middle. The columella is subvertical and arcuate, while the narrow inner lip is callous. A very shallow umbilical depression is present.

== Distribution ==
This species is endemic to New Zealand and occurs off Auckland Islands, Stewart Island, the Antipodes Islands and Chatham Island.
