= Matapara / Pickersgill Island =

Island in New Zealand

Native name: Matapara (Māori)
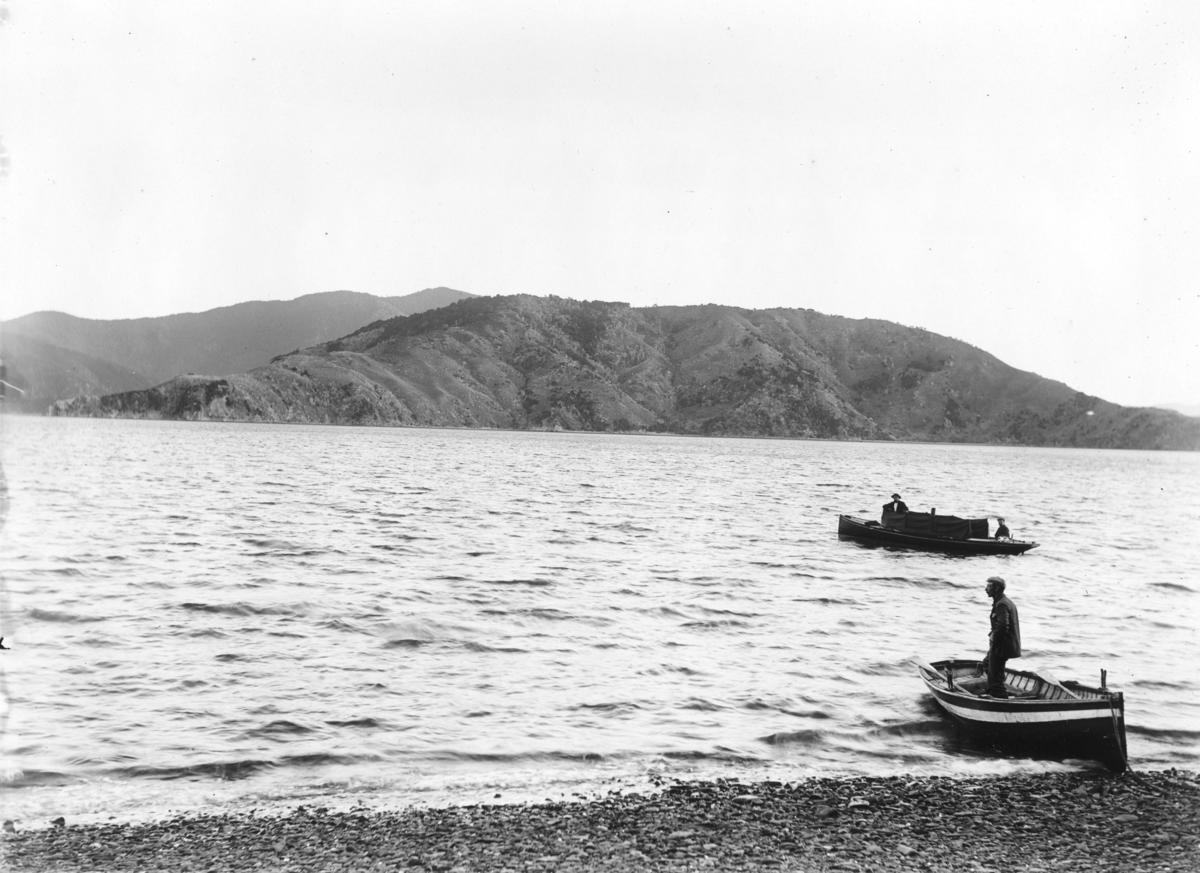
- Matapara / Pickersgill Island, as seen from Arapaoa Island in 1902

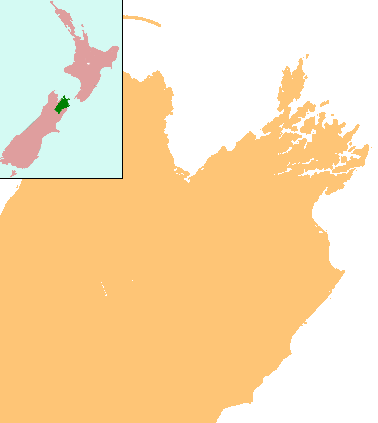
- Location of Matapara / Pickersgill Island Matapara / Pickersgill Island (New Zealand)

Geography
- Location: Queen Charlotte Sound / Tōtaranui
- Coordinates: 41.1632°S 174.2845°E
- Archipelago: Marlborough Sounds
- Adjacent to: Cook Strait
- Length: 1.68 km (1.044 mi)
- Width: 1.3 km (0.81 mi)
- Highest elevation: 186 m (610 ft)

Administration
- New Zealand

Matapara / Pickersgill Island (Māori: Matapara) is an island in New Zealand's Marlborough Sounds, in the outer reaches of Queen Charlotte Sound / Tōtaranui. The island is separated from Cook Strait by nearby Arapaoa Island, which offers little protection for Matapara from the prevailing northerly wind.

In 2014, the island was granted a dual name as part of a Treaty of Waitangi claims settlement with the Te Āti Awa iwi, with each portion of the name signifying the island's history. James Cook named the island in 1770 during his first voyage in honour of Richard Pickersgill, a Master's mate on HMS Endeavour at the time. Te Āti Awa have referred to the island as Matapara since their 1828 conquest of Tōtaranui and Kura Te Au, as part of an alliance with Tainui and Taranaki Māori. For Te Āti Ara and other iwi in the region, Matapara was a key strategic holding, with a defensible position and food sources. Portions of the island remain Wāhi Tapu (sacred sites) for local Māori to this day.

As with other offshore islands in New Zealand (such as nearby Blumine Island / Ōruawairua), work is underway on Matapara / Pickersgill Island to eradicate introduced pests and provide a sanctuary for native wildlife. Rats were previously eradicated from the island in 2005 by the Department of Conservation (DOC). Matapara's proximity to nearby Arapaoa Island means that rats were able to reintroduce themselves. Current conservation efforts are supported by local sailing clubs alongside DOC, and have facilitated the island becoming regionally significant for its high perceived naturalness, including its flora and fauna.
