= Arran Island (New Zealand) =

Island in New Zealand

Geography
- Coordinates: 45.164528°S 167.626639°E

Administration
- New Zealand
- Region: Southland

Demographics
- Population: uninhabited

Arran Island, or Kurapa is an island in the Middle Fiord of Lake Te Anau in Southland, New Zealand.

== See also ==
- List of islands of New Zealand
