= Browne Island (New Zealand) =

Island in New Zealand

- Interactive map of Browne Island

Geography
- Coordinates: 44.141491°S 168.251153°E

Administration
- New Zealand
- Region: West Coast

Demographics
- Population: uninhabited

Browne Island is an island off the West Coast of New Zealand.

== See also ==
- List of islands of New Zealand
