= Tarahiki Island =

Island in New Zealand

Nickname: Shag Island
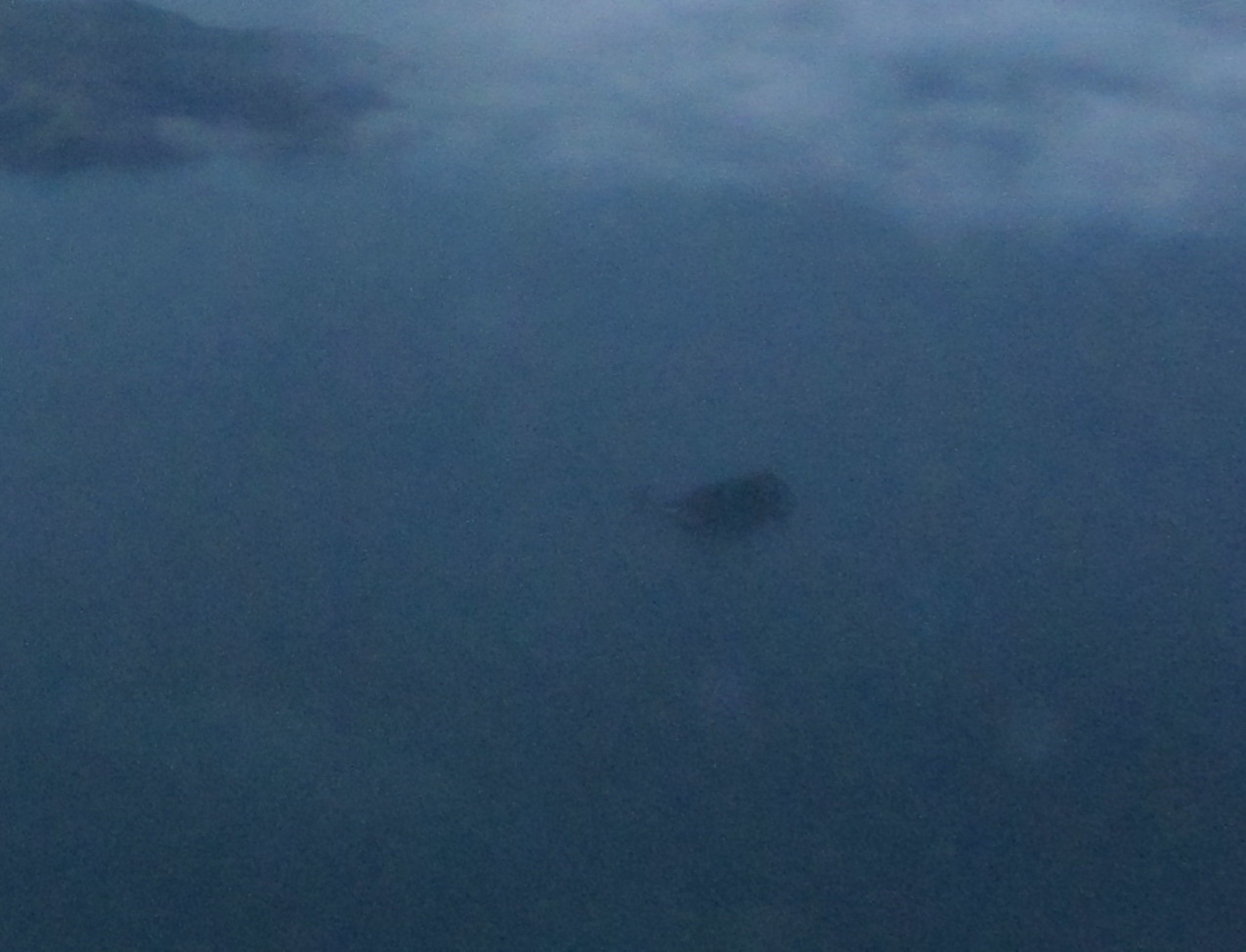
- Interactive map of Tarahiki Island

Geography
- Location: Hauraki Gulf
- Coordinates: 36.79067°S 175.22669°E
- Area: 6 ha (15 acres)
- Highest elevation: 68 m (223 ft)

Administration
- New Zealand

Demographics
- Population: 0

Tarahiki Island, also known as Shag Island, is a 6 ha (15 acres) island in the Hauraki Gulf of New Zealand. Its highest point is 68 m (223 ft) ASL and it lies 15.6 km (9.7 mi) from the mainland and about 3 km (1.9 mi) east of Waiheke Island. It is well known for its breeding colony of up to 700 spotted shags.

== See also ==
- List of islands of New Zealand
- List of islands
- Desert island
