= Bragg Nugget =

Island in New Zealand

- Interactive map of Bragg Nugget

Geography
- Location: Stewart Island
- Coordinates: 46.889899°S 168.138817°E

Administration
- New Zealand
- Region: Southland

Demographics
- Population: uninhabited

Bragg Nugget is a tied island in Halfmoon Bay, in the north of Stewart Island, New Zealand.

== Nature ==
The island is uninhabited and falls partially within the protected areas of Rakiura National Park. It features dense forests of podocarps and other native trees, along with shrubs such as mānuka, and is surrounded by rocky coasts and marine waters rich in wildlife. The surrounding terrestrial and marine environment provides habitats for rare bird species, including kiwi and yellow-eyed penguins, making the island an important site for biodiversity conservation.

== See also ==
- List of islands of New Zealand
