= Anchorage Island (New Zealand) =

Island in New Zealand

- Interactive map of Anchorage Island

Geography
- Coordinates: 47°12′15″S 167°40′30″E
- Area: 1.4 km^{2} (0.54 sq mi)

Administration
- New Zealand

Demographics
- Population: 0

Anchorage Island is a tiny uninhabited island located off the southwest coast of Stewart Island / Rakiura, New Zealand and part of Rakiura National Park.

== See also ==
- List of islands of New Zealand
- List of islands
- Desert island
