= Blumine Island =

Island in New Zealand

Blumine Island / Ōruawairua
Native name: Ōruawairua (Māori)
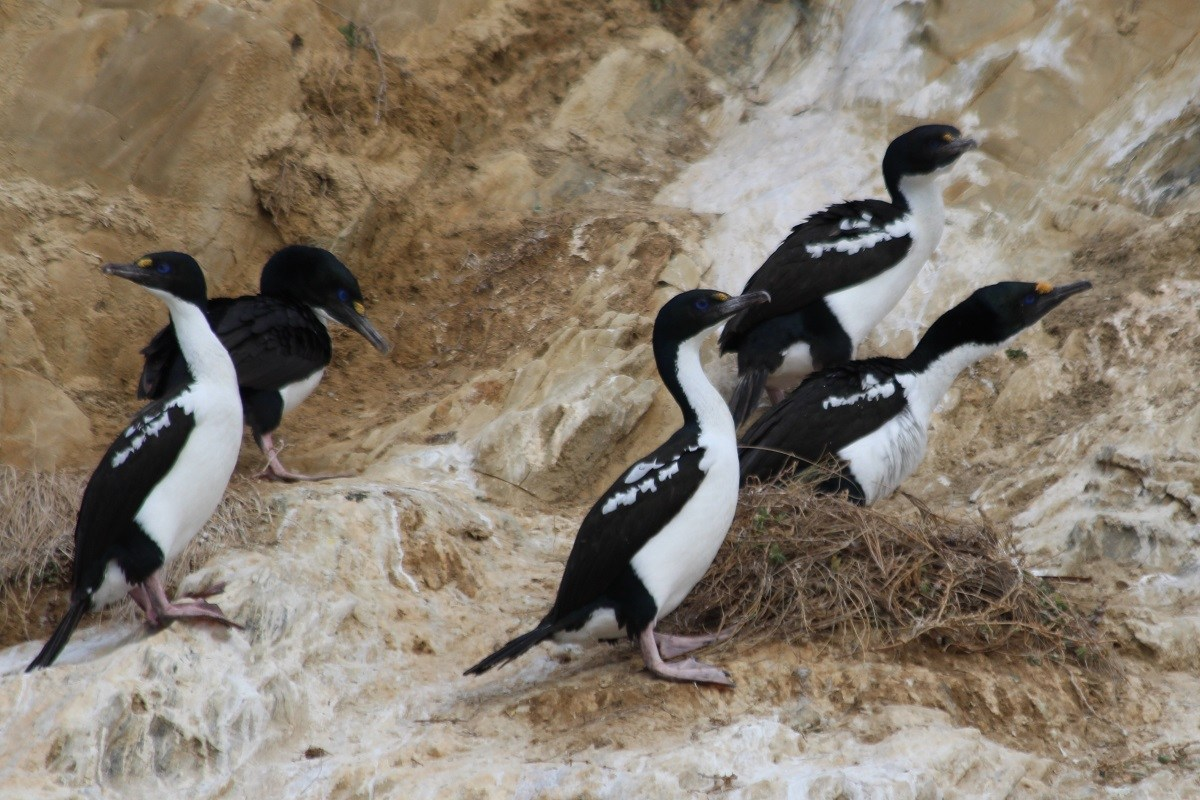
- New Zealand king shags on the island

- Location within Marlborough Sounds

Geography
- Location: Marlborough Sounds; South Island
- Coordinates: 41.1748°S 174.2395°E
- Area: 3.8 km^{2} (1.5 sq mi)
- Highest elevation: 298 m (978 ft)

Administration
- New Zealand

Demographics
- Population: 0

Blumine Island / Ōruawairua is an island in the outer reaches of Queen Charlotte Sound / Tōtaranui, in the Marlborough Sounds, at the northern end of New Zealand's South Island. It is 400 metres off the much larger Arapaoa Island.

The New Zealand Ministry for Culture and Heritage gives a translation of "meeting place of spirits" for Ōruawairua.

== Description ==
Blumine Island covers 377 ha (930 acres) and is mostly hill country. It is located about 22 kilometres (14 mi) north of Picton. A scenic reserve was established on the southern part of the island in 1912. The whole island is now a scenic reserve, which anyone can visit.

During World War II, two gun emplacements were built on the island by soldiers and workmen from the Public Works Department. This was to protect a planned American Navy anchorage in the Marlborough Sounds from a feared Japanese invasion. The sites were abandoned in 1945 towards the end of the war. In 2012, walking tracks were built, connecting the island's main campsite with the emplacements.

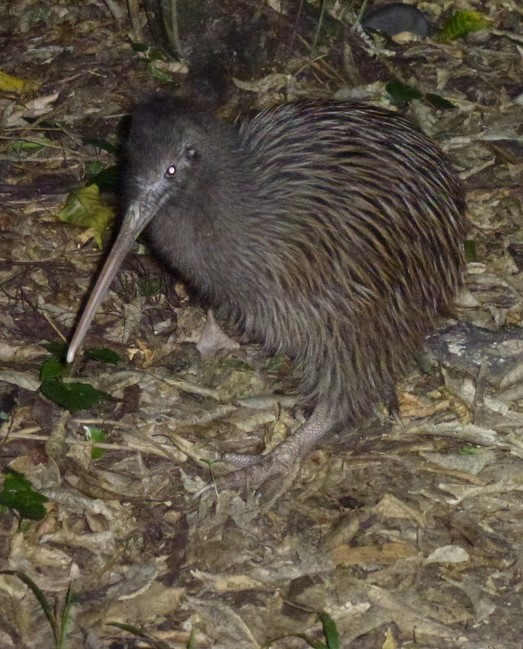
A rowi (Ōkārito kiwi) on the island

A visit by Captain James Cook left the island infested with introduced pests, which have since been eradicated through the use of helicopter poison drops, conducted by the Department of Conservation. In May 2008 the island was declared predator free and efforts began to reintroduce native species to the island. On 29 June 2010, three pairs of the rarest kiwi, the Ōkārito kiwi or rowi, were released onto the island. Other endangered bird species on the island include the orange-fronted kākāriki, saddleback and yellowhead, and the giant snail Powelliphanta hochstetteri is also present. A stoat was trapped on the island in 2025 – it is thought that it had swum there from nearby Arapaoa Island.

Blumine Island hosts Outward Bound and Untouched World Charitable Trust, who help in the maintenance of the island.

== See also ==
- List of islands of New Zealand
