= Birch Island Run =

Coordinates: 41.196029°N 77.974012°W

Physical characteristics
- Source
  - location: Grove Township, Cameron County, Pennsylvania
- Mouth
  - location: Keating Township, Clinton County, Pennsylvania
- Length: 7.2 mi (11.6 km)
- Basin size: 15.3 mi^{2} (40 km^{2})

Basin features
- Progression: West Branch Susquehanna River, Susquehanna River, Chesapeake Bay
- Tributaries
  - left: Amos Branch
  - right: Little Birch Island Run

Birch Island Run is a stream in Cameron County and Clinton County, Pennsylvania in the United States. It is a tributary of the West Branch Susquehanna River and is 7.2 miles (11.6 km) long. There are a number of coal seams in the Birch Island Run watershed, as well as iron ore. Mining has been done in the watershed. The watershed is 15.3 square miles in area and is almost entirely forested. The stream's tributaries include Little Birch Island Run and Amos Branch. Parts of the watershed are affected by acid mine drainage. However, brook trout live in the stream.

== Course ==
Birch Island Run starts in Grove Township, in Cameron County. It flows a short distance southeast before exiting Cameron County and entering Clinton County. In Clinton County, the stream enters West Keating Township and continues southeast through Sproul State Forest. It picks up the tributary Amos Branch near the central part of West Keating Township. As the stream continues southeast, its valley gets progressively deeper. It flows past several strip mines and picks up Little Birch Island Run within 1.2 miles (1.9 km) of its mouth. Birch Island Run empties into the West Branch Susquehanna River at the border between Clinton County and Centre County, near a Conrail railroad.

=== Tributaries ===
Named tributaries of Birch Island Run include Amos Branch and Little Birch Island Run. There are also a number of unnamed tributaries to the stream.

== Hydrology ==
The daily load of manganese in Birch Island Run is 17.5 pounds (7.9 kg) at the site BIR01, which is located at the confluence of Little Birch Island Run with Birch Island Run and 17.4 pounds (7.9 kg) at the site BIR02, which is located near the stream's mouth. The load of acidity is 948.5 pounds (430.2 kg) per day at BIR01, 1,254.7 pounds (569.1 kg) per day at BIR02, and 238.4 pounds (108.1 kg) per day at site BIR03, which is located at the confluence of Amos Branch with Birch Island Run. The concentration of sulfates is below 20 milligrams per liter in the upper reaches of Birch Island Run. However, an unnamed stream that experiences acid mine drainage and is a tributary of Little Birch Island Run has a sulfate concentration of 255 milligrams per liter. The pH of this unnamed tributary ranges from 3.9 to 4.2. At the mouth of Little Birch Island Run, the sulfate concentration is 40 milligrams per liter and the concentration at the mouth of Birch Island Run is 25 milligrams per liter.

On Little Birch Island Run, at site LBIR01, which is located near its mouth, the daily load of aluminum is 26.1 pounds (11.8 kg) and the daily load of manganese is 21.2 pounds (9.6 kg). The daily load of acidity is 955.1 pounds (433.2 kg) at LBIR01 and 124.9 pounds (56.7 kg) at site LBIR02.

The discharge of Birch Island Run at its confluence with Amos Branch is 1548 gallons per minute. The discharge is 5881.43 gallons per minute at its confluence with Little Birch Island Run. At the mouth of Birch Island Run, the discharge is gallons per minute.

At the confluence of Amos Run with Birch Island Run, the latter stream's pH ranged from 4.9 to 6.2 in 2002, with an average of 5.3. At the confluence of Little Birch Island Run with Birch Island Run, the latter stream's pH ranged from 4.7 to 5.7, with an average of 5.1. At the stream's mouth, the pH ranged from 4.8 to 5.5, with an average of 5.1. In the upper reaches of Birch Island Run, the pH is naturally low, as opposed to being low due to acid mine drainage. The alkalinity level of the upper parts of the stream is low.

There are two sources of acid mine drainage in the Birch Island Run watershed. Both discharge into Little Birch Island Run within 1.5 miles (2.4 km) of its mouth.

== Watershed ==
The Birch Island Run watershed is largely in southwestern Clinton County. However, a small area is in southeastern Cameron County. Most of the watershed is forested and far from development. In specific, 95% of the watershed's land is forested. There are some unused mines in the watershed, and some residential areas along Keating Road. There are also camps in the area.

The Birch Island Run watershed has a total area of 15.3 square miles. Out of these, 6.6 square miles are in the watershed of Little Birch Island Run. The tributary Amos Branch has an area of 2.3 square miles.

State Forests occupy most of the northern part of the Birch Island Run watershed. State Game Lands occupy some of the southern part of the watershed. Abandoned mining lands are mostly located in the southern and eastern areas of the watershed.

== Geography and geology ==
The headwaters of Birch Island Run are at an elevation of 2,000 feet (610 m). The mouth is at an elevation of 800 feet (240 m). The stream is located in the Appalachian Plateau. The watershed is located in the Snow Shoe Northwest USGS quadrant map.

Several coal seams are located in the Birch Island Run watershed. They are known as the Lower Kittanning, the Middle Kittanning, and the Upper Kittanning. Most of the rocks in the watershed are from Pennsylvanian or Mississippian times. Rocks from the Mississippian epoch include the Huntley Mountain Formation and the Burgoon Sandstone. Rocks from the Pennsylvanian epoch include the Pottsville Formation and the Allegheny Formation. Iron ore is also found in the watershed.

The Clearfield-McIntyre syncline is in the Birch Island Run watershed. It runs in a northeast to southwest direction, passing the confluence of Little Birch Island Run with Birch Island Run. The Chestnut Ridge-Wellsboro anticline runs near the headwaters of Birch Island Run.

== History ==
In 1835, Samuel Grove visited the Birch Island Run watershed for a number of weeks. He searched unsuccessfully for silver in the area.

Parts of the Birch Island Run watershed have been mined. A number of permits for surface mining have been issued. However, there has been no mining in the watershed since the 1980s. The TMDL for the stream was publicly discussed in Clearfield on July 14, 2004.

In 2010, a 135-acre tract of grassland partially in the Little Birch Island Run watershed was created as an elk habitat.

== Biology ==
There are brook trout living in some streams in the Birch Island Run watershed, including Birch Island Run itself. In 1915, a total of 1000 brook trout were observed in the stream. All of the streams in the watershed are considered high-quality coldwater fisheries. Almost all of the fish species in the watershed are brook trout. However, a number of scuplins have been found in the lower reaches of the stream. A smallmouth bass was also once observed near the stream's mouth.

Mayflies and stoneflies are macroinvertebrates that are found on Birch Island Run.

== See also ==
- List of rivers of Pennsylvania
