= Birch Island (New Zealand) =

Island in New Zealand

Geography
- Coordinates: 45.908162°S 169.489673°E

Administration
- New Zealand
- Region: Otago

Demographics
- Population: uninhabited

Birch Island is an island in the Clutha River in the South Island of New Zealand.

== See also ==
- List of islands of New Zealand
