= Mount Galloway =

Highest point of the Antipodes Islands

Coordinates: 49°41′S 178°47′E

Mount Galloway is the highest point on Antipodes Island, one of New Zealand's outlying islands. It rises to a height on 366 metres (1,201 ft). It is part of the most recently active volcano in the group, but there is no exact eruption date known. Mount Galloway, together with Mount Waterhouse, was probably formed during the most recent eruption. They are at least as old as the Holocene era.

Mount Galloway is situated on the western side of the main island of the Antipodes group. It is a bold round-topped hill as determined by Captain Fairchild (1834-1898). About this Captain Fairchild is written: "Probably no man was better acquainted with the coasts and harbours of New Zealand, more popular or widely respected". Chapman reached the summit of Mount Galloway in 1903 and describes it as "[c]lear ground, matted with Pleurophyllum and low-growing Ligusticum. Owing to fog we failed to see a clear lake said to exist there. There was a good deal of flat ground up there, which was literally alive with albatross".

W. Dougall saw this small lake of approximately 13 acres (53,000 m^{2}) on the top of Mt Galloway^{[5]}.

The largest of three species of Coprosma plants is confined to Mt Galloway. This mountain is also the home of the Antipodes parakeet and the Reischek's parakeet.
