= Calliope Island =

Island in North Auckland, New Zealand

- Interactive map of Calliope Island

Geography
- Coordinates: 35°50′30″S 174°31′35″E
- Length: 50 m (160 ft)
- Width: 50 m (160 ft)

Administration
- New Zealand
- Region: Northland

Demographics
- Population: uninhabited

Calliope Island is an island near Whangārei, New Zealand. The tiny, roughly triangular-shaped island, is located in Urquhart Bay, just within the mouth of Whangārei Harbour.

In the early 20th or late 19th century, Calliope Island's plant life was subject to illegal burning.
