= Birch Islands, Maine =

Two islands in Pleasant Bay, Maine, U.S.

Lower Birch Island and Upper Birch Island
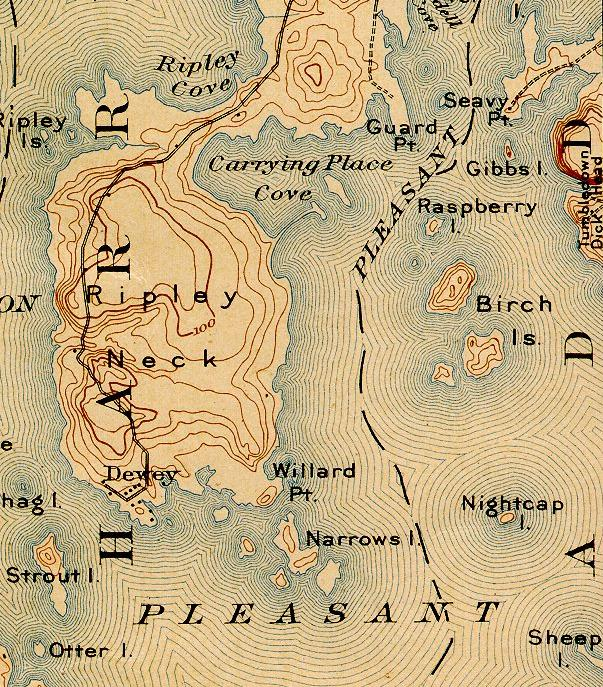
- Birch Islands from 1904 USGS map excerpt. Ripley Neck is to the west.
- Interactive map of Lower Birch Island and Upper Birch Island

Geography
- Location: Addison, Maine
- Coordinates: 44°31′53″N 67°45′44″W

Administration
- United States

The Birch Islands are two islands in Pleasant Bay, Washington County, Maine, United States. The islands, Upper and Lower Birch, are connected at low tide.

The islands are privately owned, with only one residence. They are part of the Town of Addison.

== See also ==
- List of islands of Maine
