= Anvil Islet =

Island in New Zealand

- Interactive map of Anvil Islet

Geography
- Coordinates: 36.237692°S 175.302026°E

Administration
- New Zealand
- Region: Auckland

Demographics
- Population: uninhabited

Anvil Islet is an islet in the Hauraki Gulf of New Zealand. It is west of the Great Barrier Island, and south of Mahuki / Anvil Island.
