= Awarua Rock =

Island off the coast of Northland, New Zealand

- Interactive map of Awarua Rock

Geography
- Coordinates: 35°47′05″S 174°33′25″E

Administration
- New Zealand
- Region: Northland

Demographics
- Population: uninhabited

Awarua Rock is an unofficial name for an island on the coast of New Zealand's Northland Region. It is located on the Pacific coast, north of the entrance to Whangārei Harbour.

== History ==
On 8 February 1907, the tugboat Awarua, belonging to the Devonport Steam Ferry Company left Whangārei for Kauri Mountain — a prominent bluff 10 kilometres (6.2 mi) north of Bream Head — to pick up logs to be delivered to Auckland. While approaching the bluff, she struck an uncharted rock, known by some as 'Fannie Kelly Reef', and sank near the Whangārei Heads. The ship was built in Blackwall, England in 1884 and weighed 159 tons. The crew all survived.

In 1974, Awarua Rock was named as a possible site for extracting materials for roadmaking.
