= Big Lagoon (New Zealand) =

- Location within New Zealand
- Location: Cloudy Bay, Marlborough, New Zealand
- Coordinates: 41.545°S 174.101°E
- Type: Lagoon
- Primary outflows: Pacific Ocean
- Surface area: 800 hectares (8.0 km^{2})

Big Lagoon, sometimes known as Te Whanganui (both unofficial) is a lagoon beside Cloudy Bay in Marlborough, New Zealand. It outflows into the Pacific Ocean. It is approximately 800 hectares and is part of the Wairau Lagoon, which is connected to Upper Lagoon and Chandlers Lagoon. Several islands are within the lagoon or the connected waterways, the biggest of which is Budges Island to the northwest.

There used to be a canal known as Ōrua or previously Morgan Creek which went from Ōpawa River to Big Lagoon. Big Lagoon was previously a wildlife refuge, but this has been lifted and people are now permitted to hunt over the lagoon.

Big Lagoon has beds of Ruppia, Chara and Nitella.

Big Lagoon is in the plate boundary between the Australian Plate and the Pacific Plate. This means that Big Lagoon occasionally experiences strong earthquakes, which may cause liquefaction. Sediment core samples have been taken from the lagoon to study earthquakes from the Hikurangi Margin.
