= Pig Island / Mātau =

Island in New Zealand

Coordinates: 44.943711°S 168.407910°E

Pig Island
Native name: Mātau
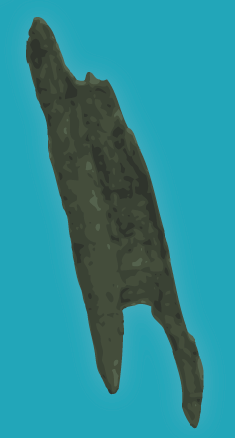
- Aerial graphic of Pig Island
- Interactive map of Pig Island

Geography
- Total islands: 1
- Area: 1.1 km^{2} (0.42 sq mi)

Administration
- New Zealand

Demographics
- Population: 0

Pig Island / Mātau is an island located at the northern end of Lake Wakatipu in the South Island of New Zealand, near the township of Glenorchy. It is slightly smaller and much flatter than its more popular neighbour Pigeon Island. It is 110 hectares (270 acres) in size and supports a variety of regenerating native scrub as well as introduced weeds.

Buff weka are also present on Pig Island, having been transferred there from Stevensons Island in Lake Wānaka in 2006.

== See also ==
- Desert island
- List of islands
