= Sentinel Peak =

Sentinel Peak, Sentinel Mountain, or variations, may refer to:

- Sentinel Peak (Antarctica)
- Sentinel Range, Antarctica
- Sentinel Peak (Alberta), Canada
- Sentinel Peak (Adamant Range), Canada
- Sentinel Peak (British Columbia), Canada
- El Centinela (Baja California, Mexico)
- El Centinella (Colima, Mexico)
- Sentinel Peak (New Zealand)
- Sentinel Peak (Drakensberg, South Africa)
- United States
  - Sentinel Peak (Alaska)
  - Sentinel Peak (Arizona)
  - Sentinel Peak (Inyo County, California)
  - Sentinel Peak (Tulare County, California)
  - Sentinel Peak (Colorado)
  - Sentinel Peak (Idaho)
  - Sentinel Peak (Montana)
  - Sentinel Peak (Nevada)
  - Sentinel Peak (New Mexico)
  - Sentinel Peak (Oregon)
  - Sentinel Peak (Washington) in the North Cascades
  - Sentinel Peak (Jefferson County, Washington) in the Olympic Mountains
