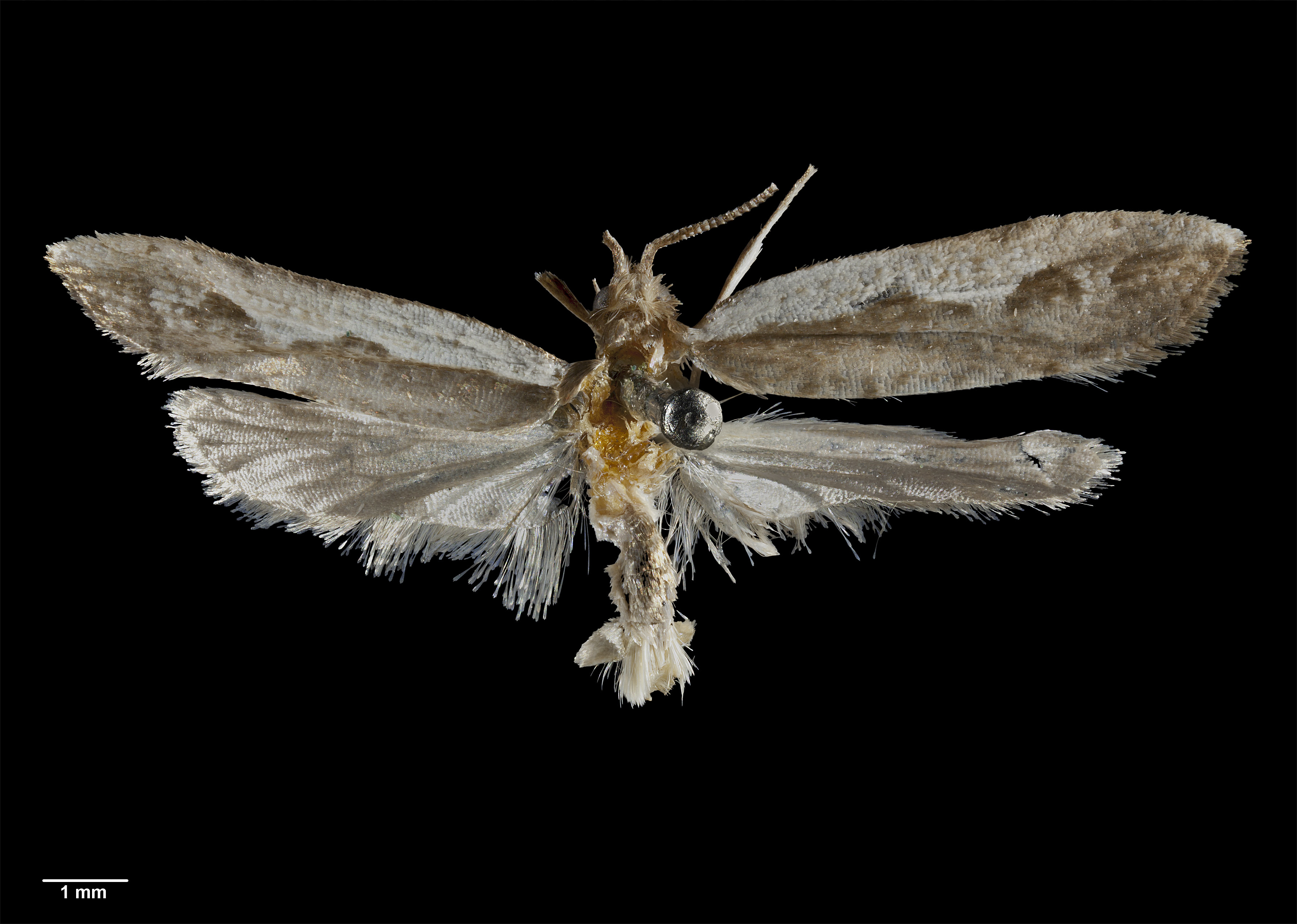
- Male holotype

Scientific classification
- Kingdom: Animalia
- Phylum: Arthropoda
- Class: Insecta
- Order: Lepidoptera
- Family: Plutellidae
- Genus: Orthenches
- Species: O. disparilis

Binomial name
- Orthenches disparilis Philpott, 1931

= Orthenches disparilis =

Species of moth endemic to New Zealand

Orthenches disparilis is a moth of the family Plutellidae. This species was first described by Alfred Philpott in 1931. It is endemic to New Zealand and has been observed in Auckland and Otago. O. disparilis is associated with species in the genus Corokia and larvae are known to feed on Corokia buddleioides. The larvae mine the leaves and feeds on the shoots and fruit of their host. Adults are on the wing in January. Dracophyllum bushes are used as over wintering sites by the adults.

== Taxonomy ==
This species was first described by Alfred Philpott in 1931 using a specimen collected in Kauri Gully, Auckland by Charles Edwin Clarke in January. George Hudson discussed and illustrated this species in his 1939 book A supplement to the butterflies and moths of New Zealand. J. S. Dugdale considered this species when describing the genus Chrysorthenches. The male holotype is held at the Auckland War Memorial Museum.

== Description ==
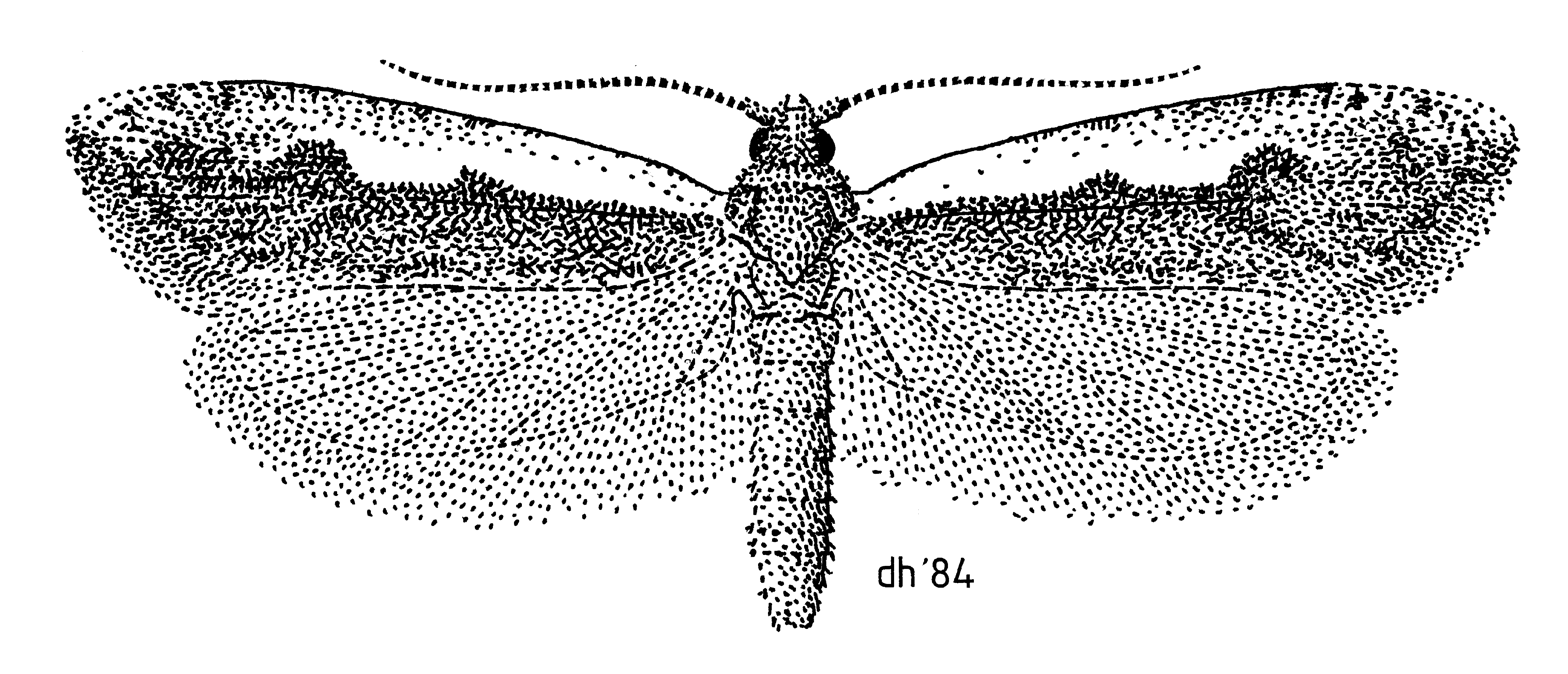
Illustration of O. disparilis.

Philpott described this species as follows:

♂. 14 mm. Head and thorax greyish brown, tegulae purplish. Palpi grey mixed with brown. Antennae brown annulated with white. Abdomen ochreous grey. Legs purplish brown mixed with whitish. Forewings with costa moderately arched, apex blunt pointed, termen hardly rounded, oblique; purplish fuscous, upper half of wing white, clear basally and becoming progressively more tinged with purplish fuscous after ½; extreme edge of costa purplish fuscous near base; a triangular projection of fuscous half into upper portion at ⅓ and a similar but larger projection at ⅔: fringes purplish fuscous. Hindwings subtrapezoidal; greyish white, purplish-tinged towards termen: fringes ochreous white.

Philpott pointed out that although this species is similar in appearance to some forms of O. chartularia the genitals of the males of these species are different.

== Distribution ==
This species is endemic to New Zealand. As well as being observed in Auckland this species has also been observed in Otago on at Stevensons Island/Te Peka Karara.

== Hosts ==
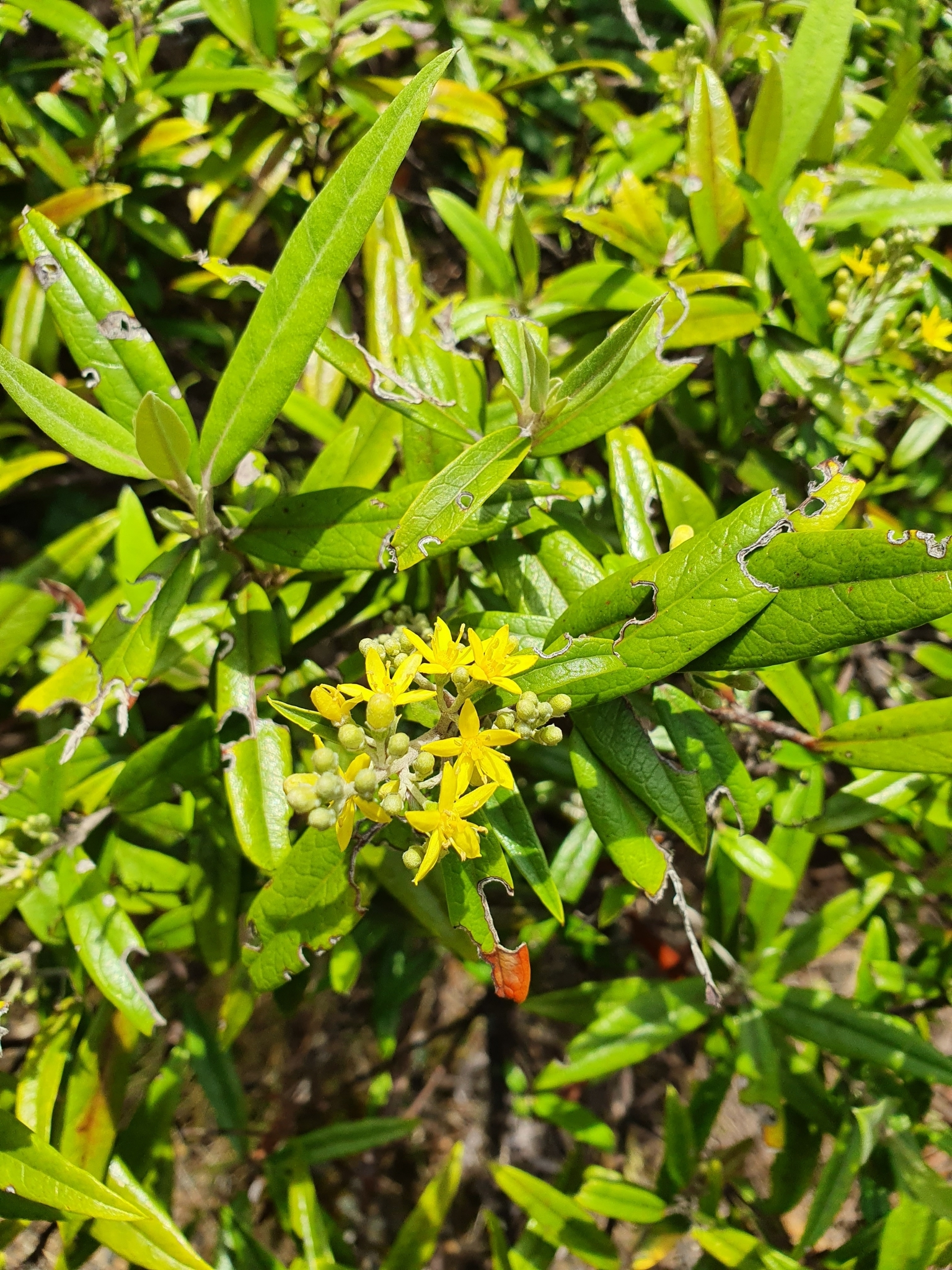
Larval host Corokia buddleioides

O. disparilis is associated with species in the genus Corokia and is known that Corokia buddleioides is a larval host for this species. Larvae of O. disparillis mine the leaves and feeds on the shoots and fruit of their host.

== Behaviour ==
Adults are on the wing in January. Dracophyllum bushes are used as over wintering sites by adult moths.
