= Mou Waho =

Island in Lake Wānaka

Coordinates: 44.554064°S 169.083845°E

Mou Waho (Māori)
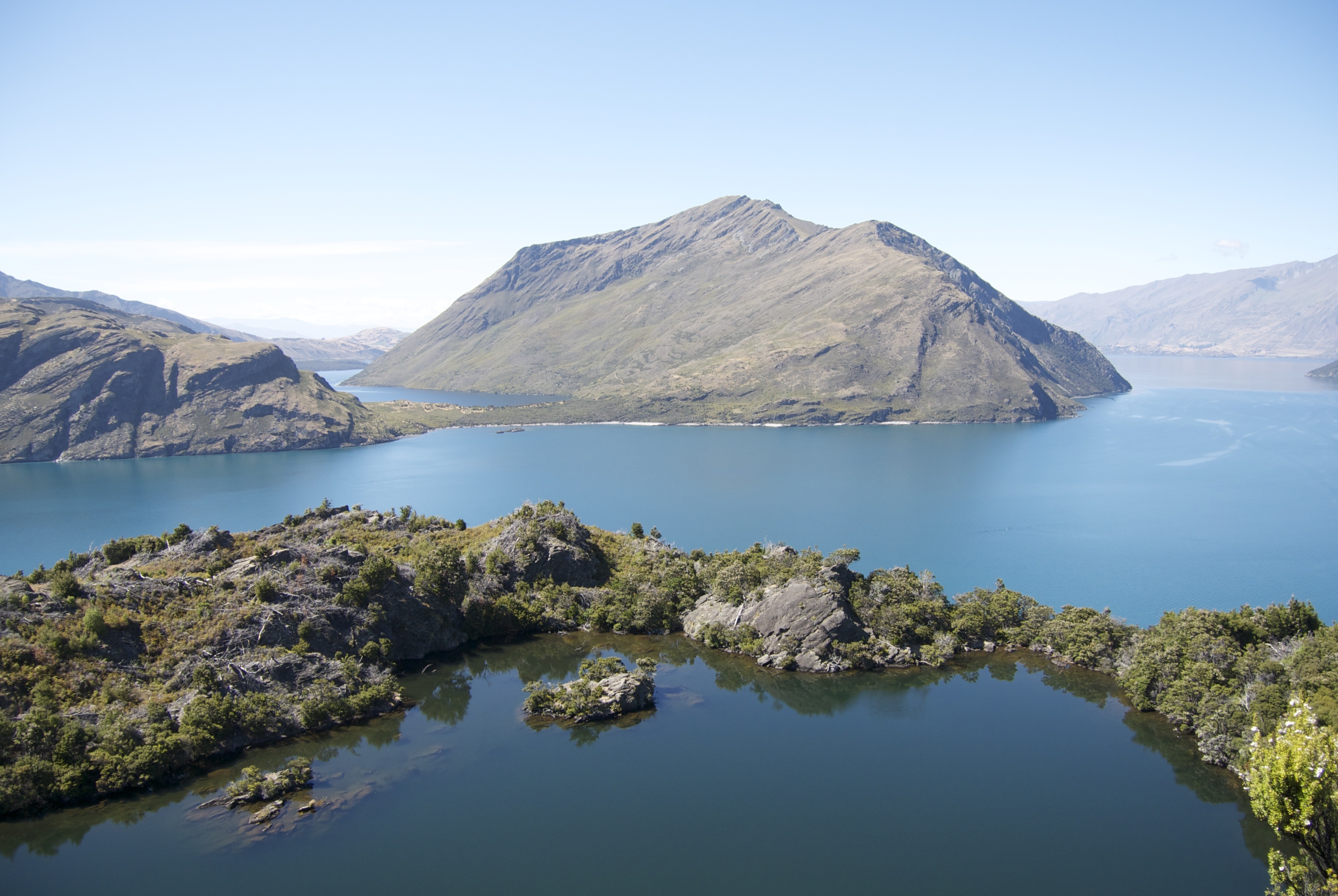
- View from Mou Waho, with Arethusa Pool in the foreground and The Peninsula in the distance
- Interactive map of Mou Waho (Māori)

Geography
- Total islands: 1
- Highest elevation: 473 m (1552 ft)
- Highest point: Tyrwhitt Peak

Administration
- New Zealand

Demographics
- Population: 0

Mou Waho is a 120-hectare island in Lake Wānaka, New Zealand. It is around the same size as the nearby Mou Tapu, these two islands being the largest in the lake. The island contains a small recursive lake, called Arethusa Pool: a glacial-scoured lake formed by the most recent ice age on an island, in a lake on an island.

Buff weka thrive on the island are predators of much of the native wildlife including mountain stone wētā, cave wētā, and Southern Alps geckos. For this reason students of the local Mount Aspiring College built 40 small wooden motels for these animals to safely live in.

== Name ==
The island was formerly variously known as Pigeon Island (therefore confused with its namesake on nearby Lake Wakatipu) and Manuka Island. It was officially renamed Harwich Island in 1925 in honour of the Royal Navy's Harwich Force but the name did not gain wide acceptance and was renamed Mou Waho in 1988 after documents from the 1920s were found attesting to the original te reo Māori name.

== See also ==
- Desert island
- List of islands
- Recursive islands and lakes
