= Panamint City, California =

Unincorporated community in California, United States

Panamint City
- Unincorporated community
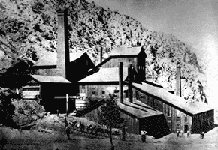

- Location in California Panamint City (the United States)
- Coordinates: 36°07′06″N 117°05′43″W
- Country: United States
- State: California
- County: Inyo
- Elevation: 6,302 ft (1,921 m)

Panamint City is a ghost town in the Panamint Range, near Death Valley, in Inyo County, California, United States. It is also known by the official Board of Geographic Names as Panamint. Panamint was a boom town founded after silver and copper were found there in 1872. By 1874, the town had a population of approximately 2,000. Its main street was one mile (1.6 km) long. Panamint had its own newspaper, the Panamint News. Silver was the principal product mined in the area. The town is located about three miles northwest of Sentinel Peak. According to the National Geographic Names Database, NAD27 latitude and longitude for the locale are 36°07′06″N 117°05′43″W, and the feature ID number is 1661185. The elevation of this location is identified as being 6,280 feet AMSL. The similar-sounding Panamint Springs, California, is located about 25.8 miles at 306.4 degrees off true north near Panamint Junction.

== History ==
Panamint City is the site of the largest and most elaborate group of Coso Painted Style pictographs. The presence of these pictographs indicates that Surprise Canyon was inhabited by Shoshone and/or Kawaiisu not long before the town was founded.

Silver was discovered by Prospectors William Ledlie Kennedy, Robert Polk Stewart, and Richard C. Jacobs, who were forced to form a partnership with a gang of six stage robbers who had followed them when they returned to stake their claim. EP Raines, an early investor in Panamint mining, convinced a group of Los Angeles businessmen to build a wagon road and then moved on to San Francisco, where he met Nevada Senator John P. Jones. Jones and the other Nevada Senator, William M. Stewart, created the Panamint Mining Company and bought up the larger mines. The two were quite famous for their heavy involvement in silver mining in Nevada, and their interest in Panamint started the boom.

Founded in 1873–74, the town grew to include many mills, saloons, stores, a red light district, and a cemetery – all built along the uppermost end of Surprise Canyon. Panamint City was regarded as a "bad and wicked" town. Because of Panamint City's lawless reputation, Wells Fargo refused to open an office there. The senators solved the question of how to transport the silver bullion from the mines by casting it into 450-pound cannonballs, which were hauled to Los Angeles in an unguarded wagon.

On July 24, 1876, a flash flood roared down the canyon and washed out most of the town. The County of Inyo maintained a graded road to Panamint City until about 1983, when a terrific series of cloudbursts completely washed the canyon out to bedrock. This road permitted large vehicles, such as house trailers and trucks with mining equipment, to access Panamint City (some of these vehicles are abandoned there). The California Desert Protection Act in 1994 placed the upper portion of Surprise in Death Valley National Park and designated the Bureau of Land Management portion below as wilderness. Congress excluded a narrow strip of land around the washed-out road and remaining private property in Panamint City. Surprise Canyon Road was hard-closed with a locked gate by the Bureau of Land Management in May 2001 as a result of a lawsuit brought about by the Center for Biological Diversity, the Sierra Club, and Public Employees for Environmental Responsibility. In the closure order there was an exemption to owners of private property, allowing them to access their property as had been done in the past. A "Stipulation Agreement" written into the terms of the closure stated that the BLM must complete an "Environmental Impact Statement" (EIS) to determine further allowed use of the road. To date, private property owners' requests for access have gone un-answered as the agencies feel many of the issues they have surrounding access will be answered by the yet-to-be released findings of the "EIS".

A post office operated at Panamint from 1874 to 1877, from 1882 to 1883, and from 1887 to 1895.

Much of Panamint City and Surprise Canyon were added to Death Valley National Park in 1994, with the exception of the land, buildings, and road that are still private property. Surprise Canyon Road and Panamint City are in a non-wilderness "cherry stem" created by an act of Congress, surrounded by Surprise Canyon Wilderness and Death Valley National Park. A "cherry stem" means that these areas were specifically excluded from wilderness because they did not meet the wilderness criteria. The cherry stem of Surprise Canyon Road and Panamint City was created by Congress to insure future public access to this historic town, and private property in the area. In May 2001 the BLM erected a gate to block vehicular access road. Today, Panamint City is accessible only by a 7.5 mile hike, strenuous for even experienced hikers.

== Nearby features ==
- Sentinel Peak is plotted on the 1988, Panamint, California topographic map at NAD83 latitude and longitude 36°05′47″N 117°04′39″W.
- Thompson Camp is plotted near NAD83 latitude and longitude 36°07′15″N 117°05′19″W on the 1988, Panamint, California topographic map.
- Hemlock Mine is plotted on the 1988, Panamint, California topographic map at NAD83 latitude and longitude 36°06′08″N 117°05′50″W.

== See also ==
- List of ghost towns in California
