= Bull Island (New Zealand) =

Island in New Zealand

Geography
- Coordinates: 44.649785°S 169.131603°E

Administration
- New Zealand
- Region: Otago

Demographics
- Population: uninhabited

Bull Island is an island in Lake Wānaka of Otago, New Zealand.

== See also ==
- List of islands of New Zealand
