= That Wānaka Tree =

Tree in New Zealand

- The tree at sunrise

- Location within New Zealand
- Species: Crack willow (Salix × fragilis)
- Location: Southern Lake Wānaka
- Coordinates: 44.6983°S 169.1175°E

That Wānaka Tree, also known as the That Wānaka Willow, is the nickname of a willow tree located at the southern end of Lake Wānaka in the Otago region of New Zealand. The tree grows alone in the water and is a popular destination for tourists to take Instagram photos.

== Popularity ==
The tree derives its nickname from the hashtag "#ThatWanakaTree", which is used on Instagram to identify photos of it. The tree has been described as "New Zealand's most famous tree" and called "one of the most photographed trees in all New Zealand." A photograph of the tree by Dennis Radermacher won the 2014 New Zealand Geographic photo of the year award.

== Human impact ==
Video of the tree three days before it was vandalised

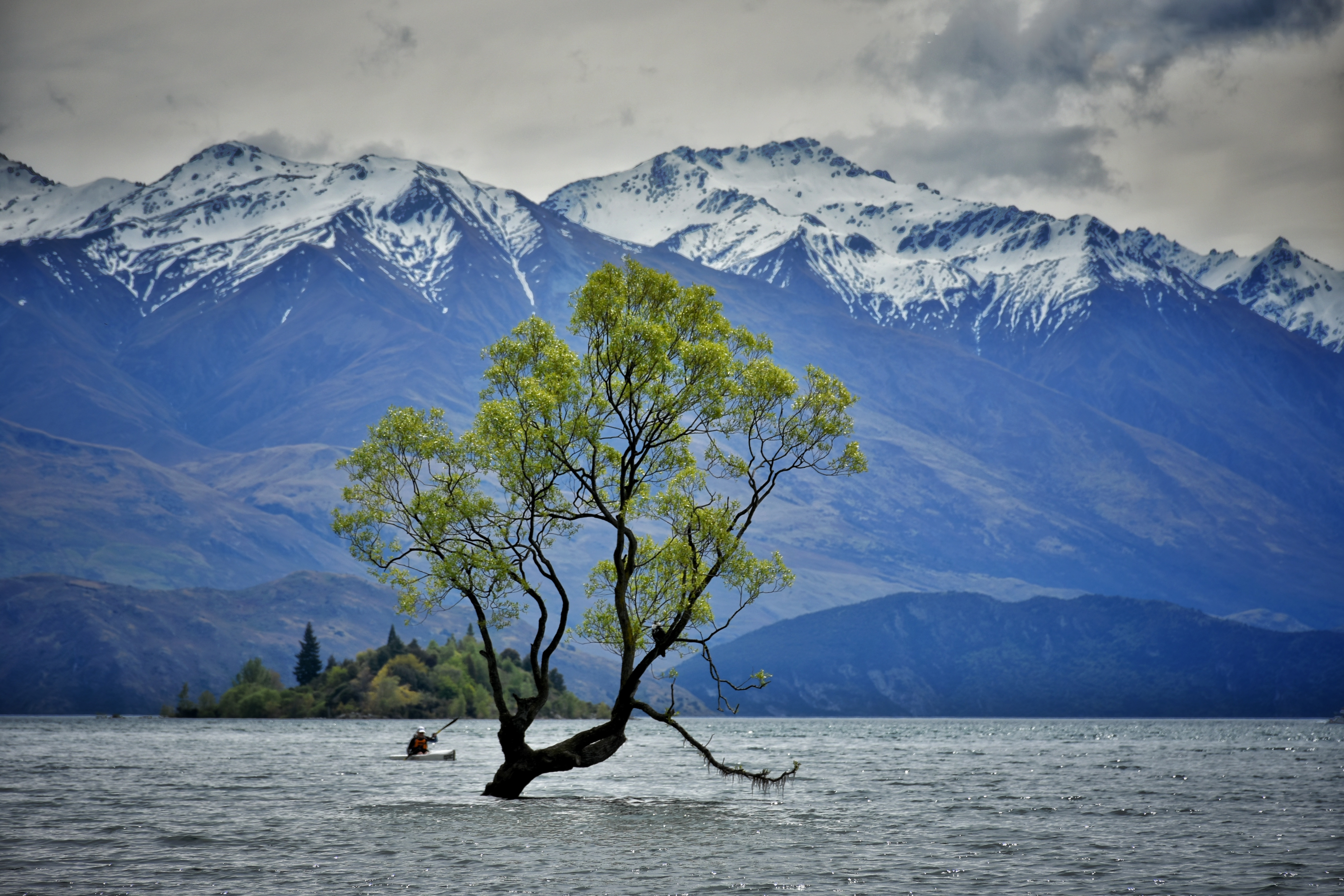
The tree after it was vandalised in March 2020

As a result of its popularity, the tree has been damaged on several occasions, both intentionally and unintentionally. A branch came off in late 2017 because tourists had climbed it, which led to the local tourism board installing signs discouraging the practice. The tree was vandalised on 18 March 2020, with multiple limbs being sawn off and left on the shore. Reports noted that the cold water the roots are submerged in would retard the limbs' regrowth. The human impact on the tree has been compared to that at other tourist attractions like Joshua Tree National Park and Uluru.

== See also ==
- List of individual trees
