= Lake Wānaka =

Lake in Otago, New Zealand

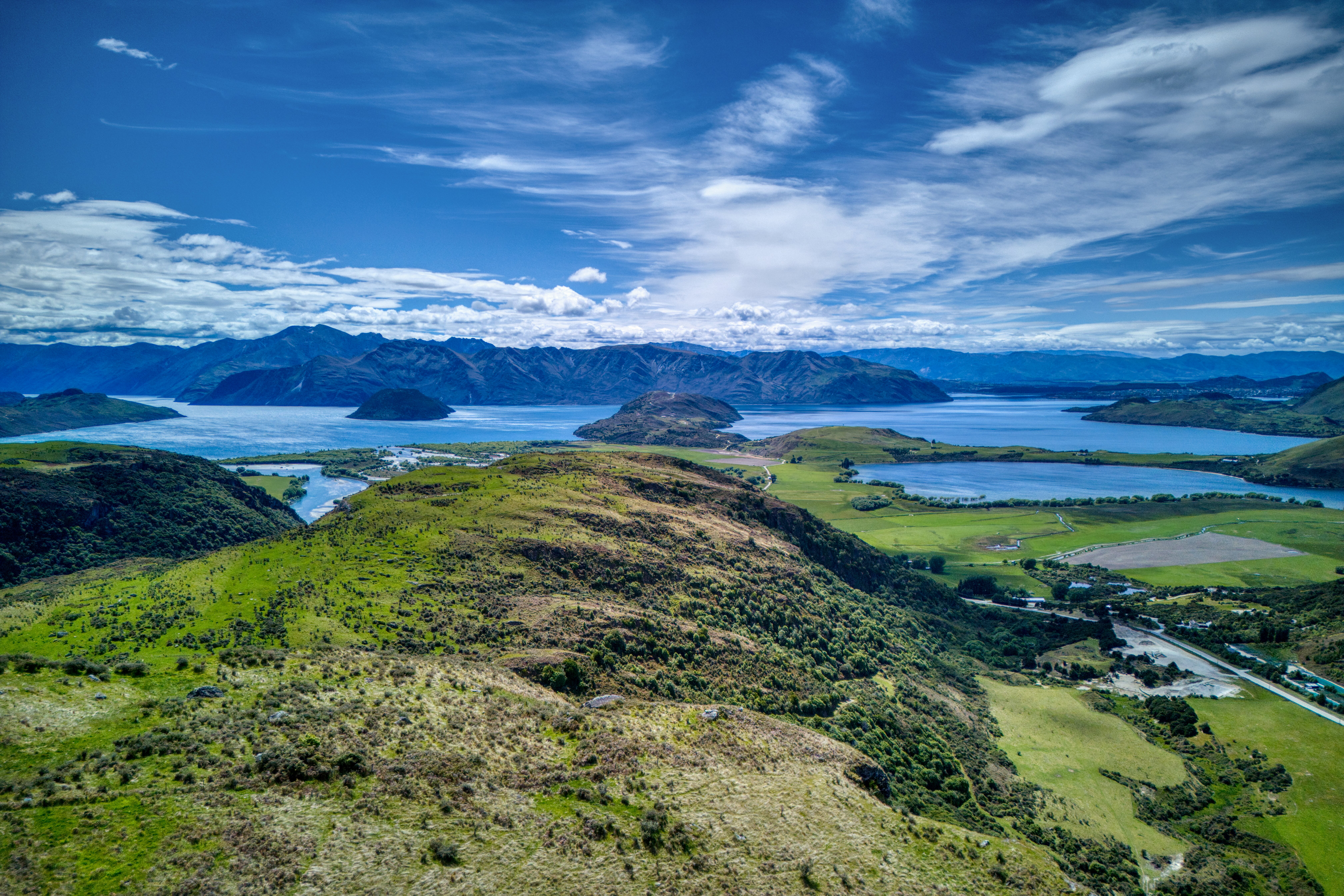

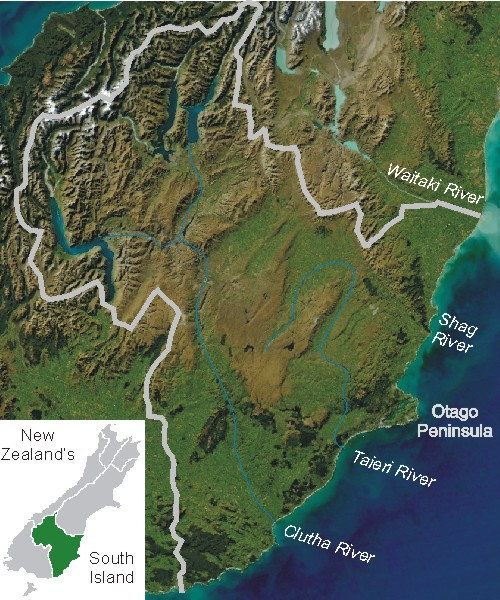
- Location within Otago peninsula
- Interactive map of Lake Wānaka
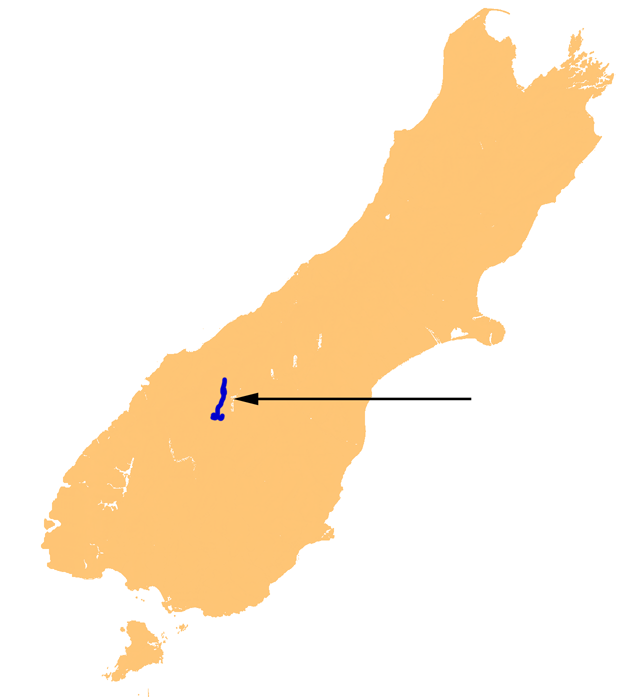
- Location on the South Island
- Location: Queenstown-Lakes District, Otago, South Island
- Coordinates: 44°30′S 169°08′E
- Primary inflows: Makarora River, Matukituki River
- Primary outflows: Clutha River / Mata-Au
- Catchment area: 2,590 km^{2} (1,000 sq mi)
- Basin countries: New Zealand
- Max. length: 42 km (26 mi)
- Max. width: 10 km (6.2 mi)
- Surface area: 180 km^{2} (69 sq mi)
- Average depth: ~ 160 m (520 ft)
- Max. depth: 311 m (1,020 ft)
- Water volume: 33 km^{3} (7.9 cu mi)
- Residence time: 6 years
- Surface elevation: 300 m (980 ft)
- Islands: Bull Island, Mou Tapu, Mou Waho, Ruby Island, Stevensons Island

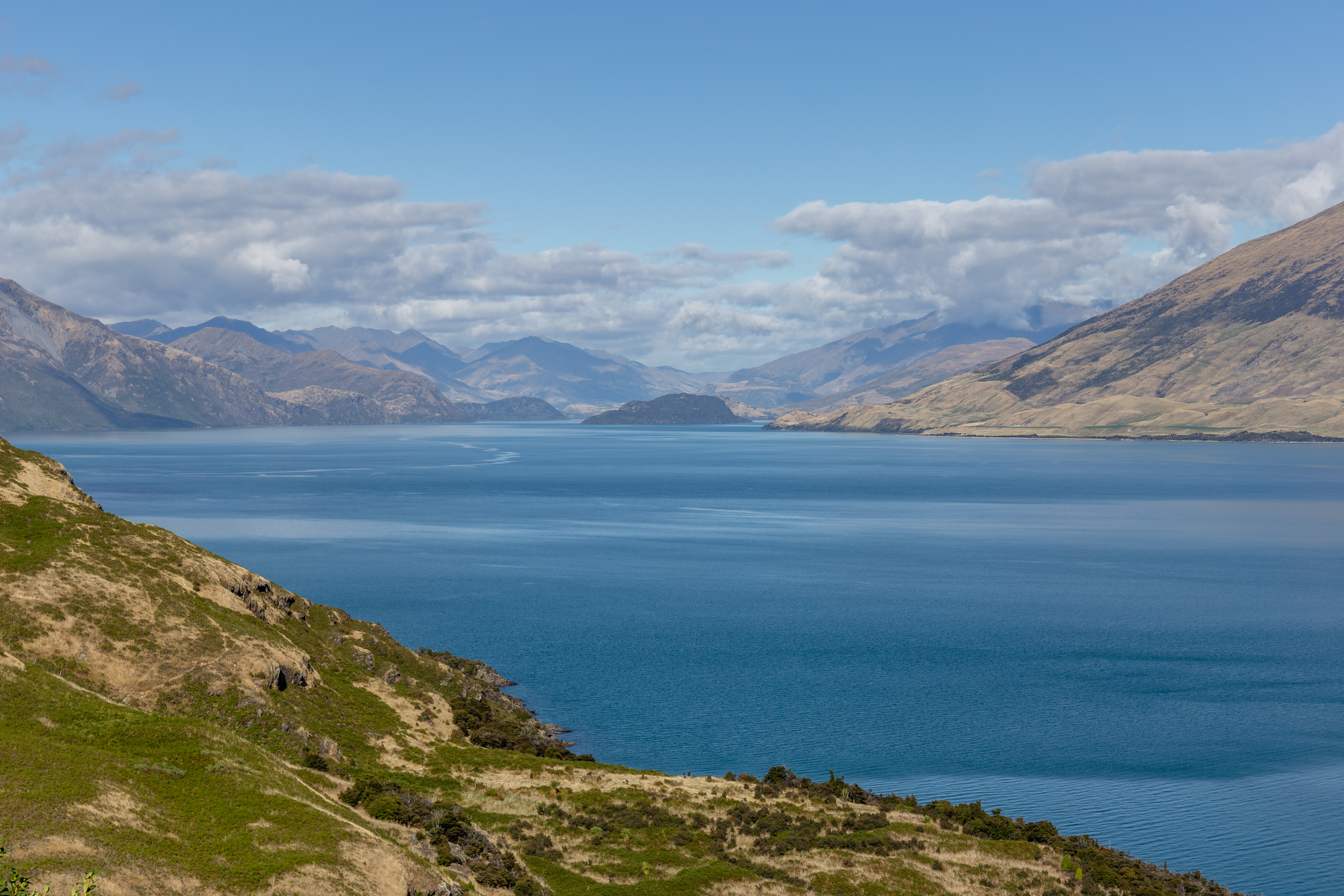
Northern end of Lake Wānaka

Lake Wānaka is New Zealand's fourth-largest lake and the seat of the town of Wānaka in the Otago region. The lake is 300 meters above sea level, covers about 180 km^{2} (69 sq mi), and is more than 300 m (980 ft) deep.

"Wānaka" is the South Island Māori dialect pronunciation of wānanga, which means "the lore of the tohunga or priest" or a place of learning. (Note: While it has been suggested that the name could also be a variation of Ō-Anake or Ō-Anaka, 'The place of (chief) Anaka', Ngāi Tahu's atlas Ka Huru Manu dismisses this variation as a simple spelling mistake.)

== Geography ==
=== Geography ===
Lake Wānaka lies at the heart of the Otago Lakes in the lower South Island of New Zealand. The township of Wānaka, which sits in a glacier-carved basin on the shores of the lake, is the gateway to Mt Aspiring National Park. Lake Hāwea is a 15-minute drive away, en route to the frontier town of Makarora, the last stop before the West Coast Glacier region. To the south is the historic Cardrona Valley, a popular scenic alpine route to neighbouring Queenstown.

=== Geology ===
Lake Wānaka lies in a u-shaped valley formed by glacial erosion during the last ice age more than 10,000 years ago. It is fed by the Matukituki and Makarora Rivers, and is the source of the Clutha River / Mata-Au.

At its greatest extent, which is roughly along a north–south axis, the lake is 42 kilometres long. Its widest point, at the southern end, is 10 kilometres. The lake's western shore is lined with high peaks rising to over 2000 metres above sea level. Along the eastern shore the land is also mountainous, but the peaks are somewhat lower.

Nearby Lake Hāwea lies in a parallel valley carved by a neighbouring glacier eight kilometres to the east. At their closest point (a rocky ridge called The Neck), the lakes are only 1000 metres apart.

Four small islands within the lake include Ruby Island, Stevensons Island, Mou Tapu and Mou Waho (Harwich) Island. Some host ecological sanctuaries, such as one for buff weka on Stevensons Island. Mou Tapu island is 120 hectares in size and is a pest free island. Mountain stone wētā and the Southern Alps gecko can be found here.

The towns of Wānaka and Albert Town are near the lake's outflow into the Clutha River / Mata-Au.

== Human history ==
=== Exploration and settlement ===
Palaeoecological evidence dates human occupation of the Lake Wānaka catchment to c.1300–1350 AD, not long after Polynesians arrived in New Zealand. Their burnoffs of forest cover dramatically changed the landscape to one dominated by ferns and shrubs. Charcoal deposited in the lake indicates continuous use of the area since then, especially in the Roy's Bay catchment, the site of the modern town of Wānaka. The Cromwell basin supported a large population of moa, which were hunted to extinction about 500 years ago.

The Wānaka area was a natural crossroads for Māori. The Haast Pass gave access to the West Coast and its pounamu; the Cardrona Valley led to the natural rock bridge "Whatatorere", which was the only place that the Kawarau River and Mata-Au (the Clutha River) could be crossed without boats. Native reeds were used to build mōkihi, small boats that enabled a swift return downriver to the east coast.

Until the early nineteenth century, Wānaka was visited annually by Ngāi Tahu who sought pounamu in the mountains above the Haast River and hunted eels and birds over summer, returning to the east coast by descending Mata-Au in mōkihi (reed boats).

According to the Ngāi Tahu, Lake Wānaka was dug by the Waitaha explorer Rākaihautū with his kō (foot plough) named Tūwhakaroria. After Waitaha arrived in the Uruao waka at Whakatū (Nelson), Rākaihautū divided his people into two groups. Rākaihautū led his group down the middle of the island, digging the freshwater lakes of Te Waipounamu (the South Island).

Numerous kāinga mahinga kai (food-gathering places) and kāinga nohoanga (settlements) were located around the lake. The Kāti Māmoe settlement at the southern end of the lake was named Parakarehu. The area was invaded by the Ngāi Tahu in the early 18th century.

Ngāi Tahu use of the land was ended by attacks by North Island tribes. In the last years of the Musket Wars, in 1836 the Ngāti Tama chief Te Pūoho led a 100-person taua (war party), armed with muskets, down the West Coast and over the Haast Pass. They fell on the Ngāi Tahu encampment between Lake Wānaka and Lake Hāwea, capturing 10 people and killing and eating two children. Although Te Puoho was later killed by the southern Ngāi Tahu leader Tūhawaiki, Māori seasonal visits to the area ceased.

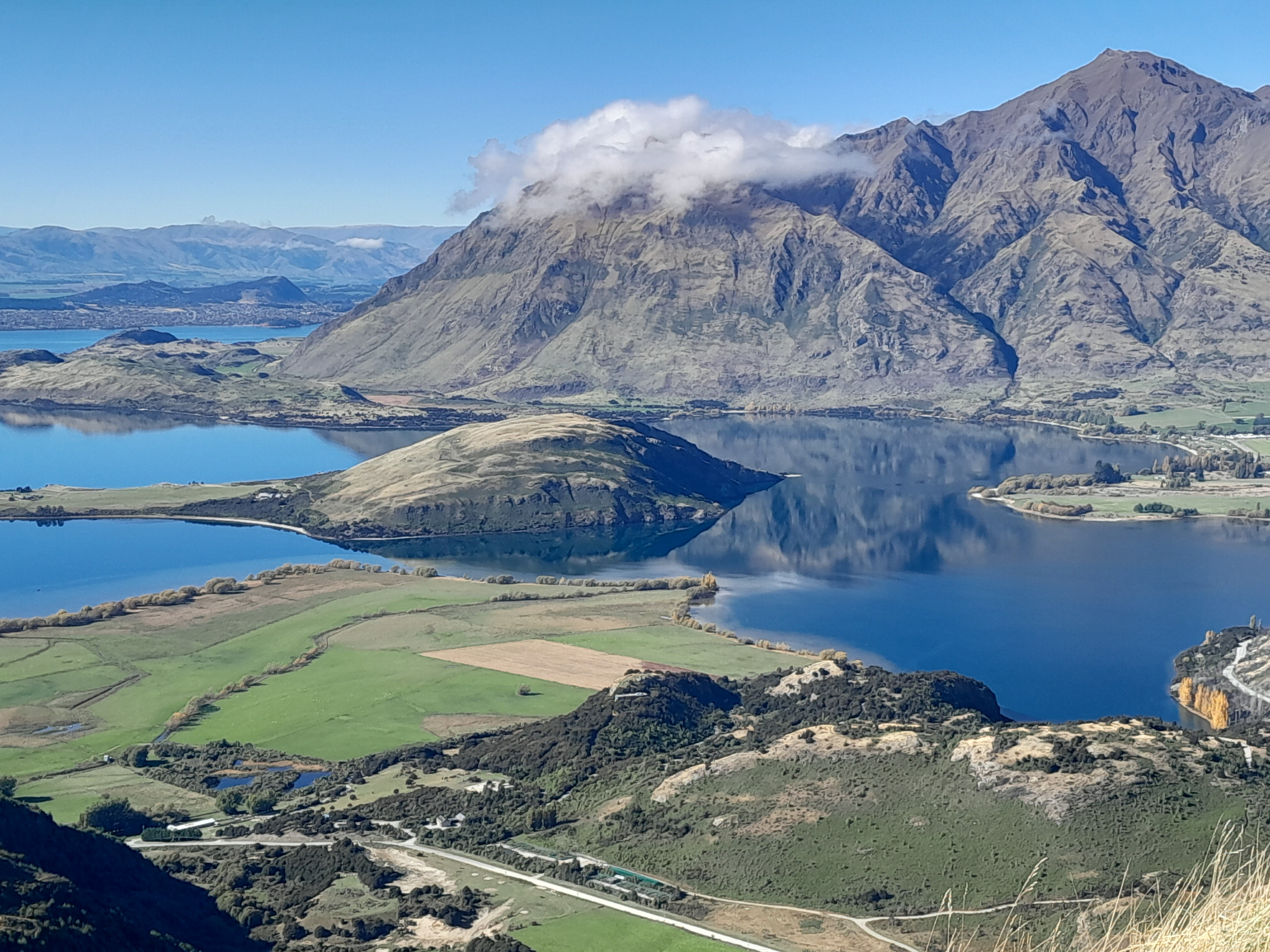
Lake Wānaka, with Glendhu Bay in the foreground (Autumn 2023)

The first recorded map of Lake Wānaka was drawn in 1844 by the southern Ngāi Tahu leader Te Huruhuru. The first Pākehā to see the lake was Nathanael Chalmers in 1853. Guided by Reko and Kaikōura, he walked from Tuturau (Southland) to the lake via the Kawarau River. However he was stricken by dysentery, so his guides returned him down the Clutha, shooting the rapids in a mōkihi.

By 1861, several sheep stations had been established in and around the south end of the lake, and in 1862, the lake itself was surveyed from a whaleboat.

=== Names ===
The name "Lake Wanaka" was in use in 1863 when the first survey of the proposed township of Wanaka was made.

The town was renamed "Pembroke" within a month of the surveyor returning his books to Dunedin. It reverted to "Wanaka" on 1 September 1940, to reduce confusion between the names of the town and the lake.

The official name of the lake was updated from "Lake Wanaka" to "Lake Wānaka" in 2019, and the town's name to "Wānaka" in 2021.

=== Current use and tourism ===
The lake is now a popular resort, and is much used in the summer for fishing, boating and swimming. The nearby mountains and fast-flowing rivers support adventure tourism year-round.

Popular activities include alpine and cross-country skiing and snowsports, tramping, mountain-biking, mountaineering, rock-climbing and parapenting.

=== Conservation ===
As one of the few lakes in the South Island with an unmodified shoreline, the lake is protected by special legislation, the Lake Wanaka Preservation Act of 1973. The Act established a 'Guardians of Lake Wanaka' group, appointed by the Minister of Conservation, which advises on measures to protect the lake.

Oxygen weed (Lagarosiphon major), an aquarium plant and invasive species native to Southern Africa, has been a problem in the lake's ecosystem for some time. Attempts to eradicate the weed have not been successful. Substantial suction dredging operations have shown promise, but tend to miss isolated spots which then regrow into larger weed beds.

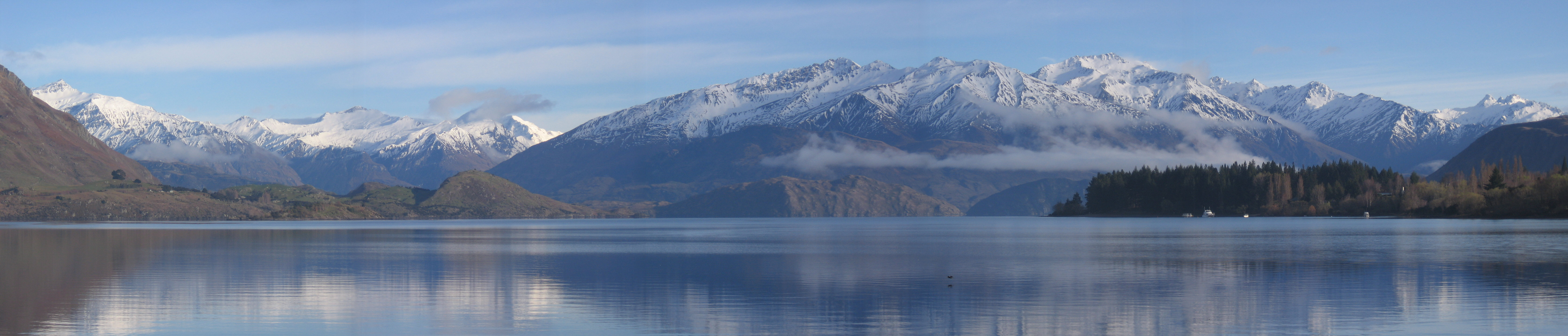
View of Lake Wānaka, New Zealand

== Pūteketeke conservation ==
In 2013 zoologist John Darby established the Lake Wānaka Grebe Project. Floating platforms on which the birds can nest have resulted in an increase in breeding pairs. The pūteketeke was New Zealand's Bird of the Year in 2023 after an international publicity campaign mounted by British-American comedian John Oliver.

== Climate ==
Climate data for Lake Wānaka (Wānaka Airport), elevation 352 m (1,155 ft), (1991–2020)
Month	Jan	Feb	Mar	Apr	May	Jun	Jul	Aug	Sep	Oct	Nov	Dec	Year
Mean daily maximum °C (°F)	23.8 (74.8)	23.8 (74.8)	20.7 (69.3)	16.4 (61.5)	12.3 (54.1)	8.5 (47.3)	8.1 (46.6)	10.7 (51.3)	13.8 (56.8)	16.4 (61.5)	19.1 (66.4)	21.9 (71.4)	16.3 (61.3)
Daily mean °C (°F)	17.3 (63.1)	17.2 (63.0)	14.4 (57.9)	10.8 (51.4)	7.5 (45.5)	4.3 (39.7)	3.7 (38.7)	5.7 (42.3)	8.4 (47.1)	10.7 (51.3)	13.0 (55.4)	15.6 (60.1)	10.7 (51.3)
Mean daily minimum °C (°F)	10.9 (51.6)	10.6 (51.1)	8.1 (46.6)	5.2 (41.4)	2.8 (37.0)	0.1 (32.2)	−0.6 (30.9)	0.8 (33.4)	3.0 (37.4)	4.9 (40.8)	6.9 (44.4)	9.3 (48.7)	5.2 (41.3)
Average rainfall mm (inches)	55.4 (2.18)	42.0 (1.65)	45.7 (1.80)	46.6 (1.83)	60.2 (2.37)	56.3 (2.22)	46.2 (1.82)	52.5 (2.07)	50.0 (1.97)	50.9 (2.00)	54.5 (2.15)	57.6 (2.27)	617.9 (24.33)
Mean monthly sunshine hours	231.5	201.7	182.6	164.0	135.5	120.5	126.6	155.8	172.5	193.8	202.2	212.1	2,098.8
Source 1: NIWA
Source 2: Lake Wanaka (sun)

Climate data for Albert Burn, elevation 1,280 m (4,200 ft), (1991–2020)
Month	Jan	Feb	Mar	Apr	May	Jun	Jul	Aug	Sep	Oct	Nov	Dec	Year
Mean daily maximum °C (°F)	14.8 (58.6)	15.2 (59.4)	13.2 (55.8)	9.8 (49.6)	7.0 (44.6)	4.8 (40.6)	3.8 (38.8)	5.0 (41.0)	7.0 (44.6)	8.4 (47.1)	10.8 (51.4)	13.2 (55.8)	9.4 (48.9)
Daily mean °C (°F)	10.3 (50.5)	10.5 (50.9)	8.8 (47.8)	6.0 (42.8)	3.5 (38.3)	1.3 (34.3)	0.3 (32.5)	1.2 (34.2)	2.9 (37.2)	4.2 (39.6)	6.3 (43.3)	8.7 (47.7)	5.3 (41.6)
Mean daily minimum °C (°F)	5.7 (42.3)	5.9 (42.6)	4.4 (39.9)	2.2 (36.0)	0.0 (32.0)	−2.3 (27.9)	−3.1 (26.4)	−2.5 (27.5)	−1.2 (29.8)	0.0 (32.0)	1.9 (35.4)	4.2 (39.6)	1.3 (34.3)
Average rainfall mm (inches)	308.3 (12.14)	220.1 (8.67)	169.8 (6.69)	228.0 (8.98)	302.0 (11.89)	160.2 (6.31)	222.6 (8.76)	148.1 (5.83)	244.7 (9.63)	239.7 (9.44)	217.7 (8.57)	266.4 (10.49)	2,727.6 (107.4)
Source: NIWA

== In popular culture ==
A willow growing just inside the lake, often known as "That Wānaka Tree", is a tourist attraction in its own right, featuring on many tourists' Instagram feeds.

=== In film ===
The region has been the setting for many international films, including The Lord of the Rings, The Hobbit, the Legend of S, and A Wrinkle in Time. Lake Wānaka was mentioned several times in the 2006 movie Mission: Impossible III as a location the lead couple visited and as the answer to Ethan Hunt's question on the phone to verify the identity of his wife.

The New Zealand cook and author Annabel Langbein, who owns a small estate at the side of the lake, filmed her series The Free Range Cook and Simple Pleasures here.

=== As a doomsday refuge ===
New Zealand, and Wānaka and Queenstown in particular, have been reported to be a favoured refuge for the 'super rich' in the event of a cataclysm. One such high net worth individual is Peter Thiel, who purchased 193 hectares (480 acres) of lakeside land in 2015. While he had not yet developed it as of 2020, plans have been announced to develop it as a luxury resort.

== See also ==
- Lakes of New Zealand
- List of lakes in New Zealand
- Geography of Otago
- Roys Peak
- Sentinel Peak (New Zealand)
