= Sentinel Peak (New Zealand) =

Mountain in New Zealand

- Location within New Zealand

Highest point
- Elevation: 1,840 m (6,040 ft)
- Coordinates: 44°25′16″S 169°13′22″E

Geography
- Parent range: McKerrow Range

Sentinel Peak is located to the north-east of "The Neck" on New Zealand's South Island. At 1,814 metres (5,951 ft) it offers commanding views over Lake Wānaka and Lake Hāwea.

A track leads up from a DOC campsite just to the west of Sawyer Burn. The track ends at Sawyer Burn Hut. There is no track above the hut but there are numerous possible routes. This hut offers rudimentary shelter and provides a good base for climbing the peak. At least in summer it is possible to complete the whole climb from the road and back in a day.
