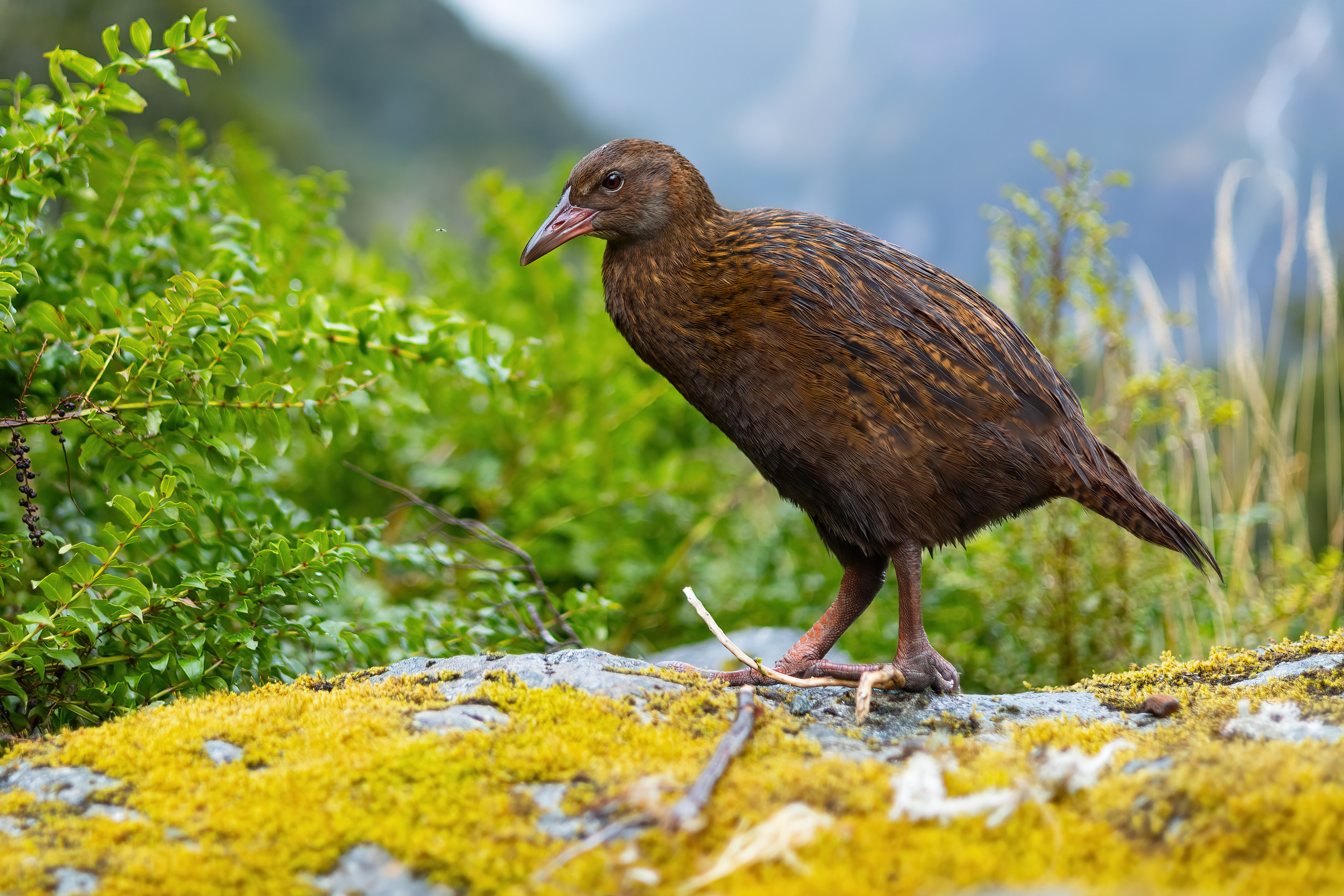
- In the South Island, New Zealand

Conservation status
- Vulnerable (IUCN 3.1)

Scientific classification
- Kingdom: Animalia
- Phylum: Chordata
- Class: Aves
- Order: Gruiformes
- Family: Rallidae
- Genus: Gallirallus
- Species: G. australis

Binomial name
- Gallirallus australis (Sparrman, 1786)
- Geographic range of the weka

Audio
- Call of the Buff weka

= Weka =

Species of flightless bird

The weka, also known as the Māori hen or woodhen (Gallirallus australis) is a flightless bird species of the rail family. It is endemic to New Zealand. Some authorities consider it as the only extant member of the genus Gallirallus. Four subspecies are recognized but only two (northern/southern) are supported by genetic evidence.

The weka are sturdy brown birds about the size of a chicken. As omnivores, they feed mainly on invertebrates and fruit. Weka usually lay eggs between August and January; both sexes help to incubate.

== Description ==
Weka are large rails. They are predominantly rich brown mottled with black and grey; the brown shade varies from pale to dark depending on subspecies. The male is the larger sex at 50–60 cm (20–24 in) in length and 532–1,605 g (1.173–3.538 lb) in weight. Females measure 46–50 cm (18–20 in) in length and weigh 350–1,035 g (0.772–2.282 lb). The reduced wingspan ranges from 50 to 60 cm (20 to 24 in).

The relatively large, reddish-brown beak is about 5 cm (2.0 in) long, stout and tapered, and used as a weapon. The pointed tail is near-constantly being flicked, a sign of unease characteristic of the rail family. Weka have sturdy legs and reduced wings.

== Taxonomy and distribution ==
The common name, "weka", is a Māori word. The species was named Rallus australis by Anders Erikson Sparrman in 1789. Sparrman published the information in Museum Carlsonianum, four fascicules based on specimens collected while voyaging with Captain James Cook between 1772 and 1775. Australis is Latin for "southern". Johann Georg Wagler's suggestion of the genus Ocydromus in 1830 to describe each weka as a species was generally adopted. However, weka were later classified as a single species in the genus Gallirallus with four subspecies.

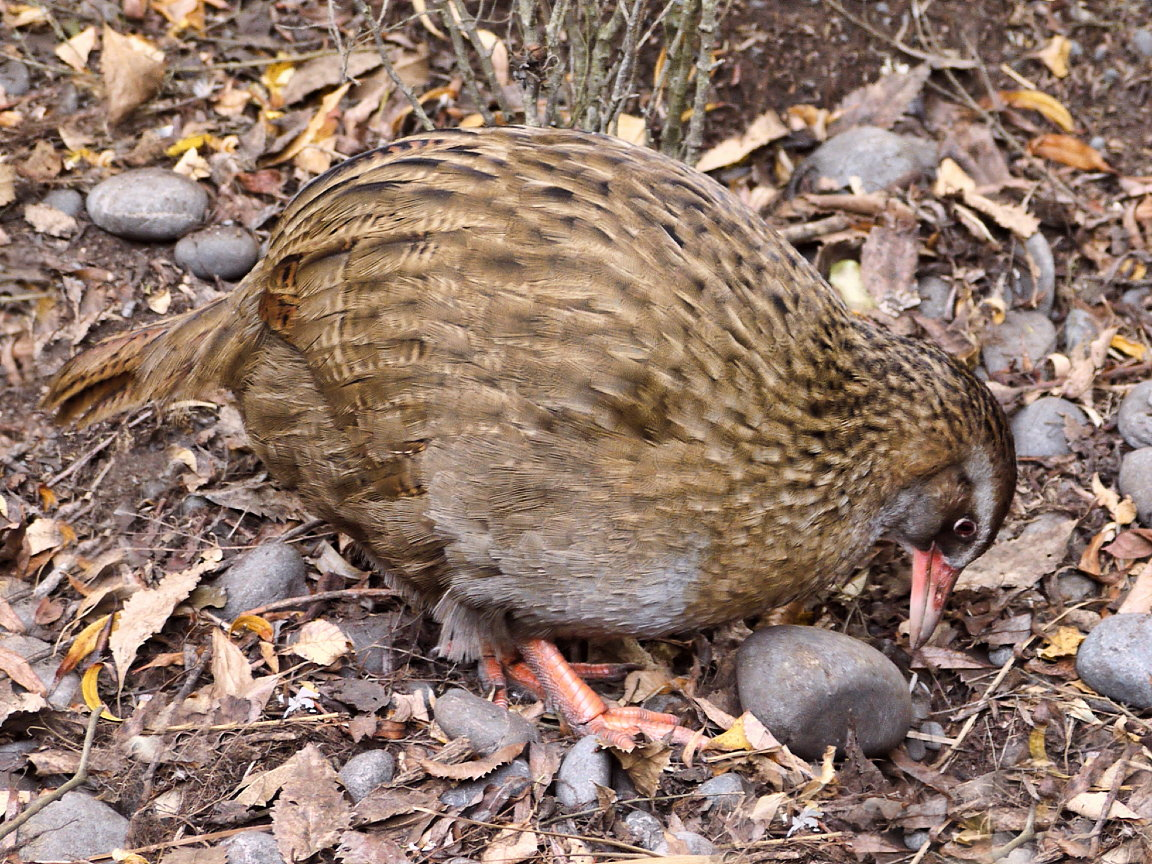
A buff weka at Willowbank Wildlife Reserve, Christchurch

The buff weka (Gallirallus australis hectori) formerly inhabited the eastern districts of the South Island but is now confined to Chatham Island and Pitt Island, to which it was introduced in the early 1900s, and where they are widely hunted and eaten in the autumn (due to their status as non-native to the islands).

Reintroduction into Canterbury has been unsuccessful so far, but introductions to Mou Waho Island (in Lake Wānaka in 2004) and from there to Pigeon and Pig Island (in Lake Wakatipu in 2005/2006) have been much more successful. It has a lighter overall colouring than the other subspecies. The North Island weka (G. a. greyi) is represented by original populations in Northland, and Poverty Bay, and by liberations elsewhere from that stock. This subspecies differs in its greyer underparts, and brown rather than reddish coloured legs. Individual sightings around the Dunedin area suggest several individuals may exist in the southeastern South Island, either as surreptitious or inadvertent introductions, or possibly as remnants of a population previously thought extinct.

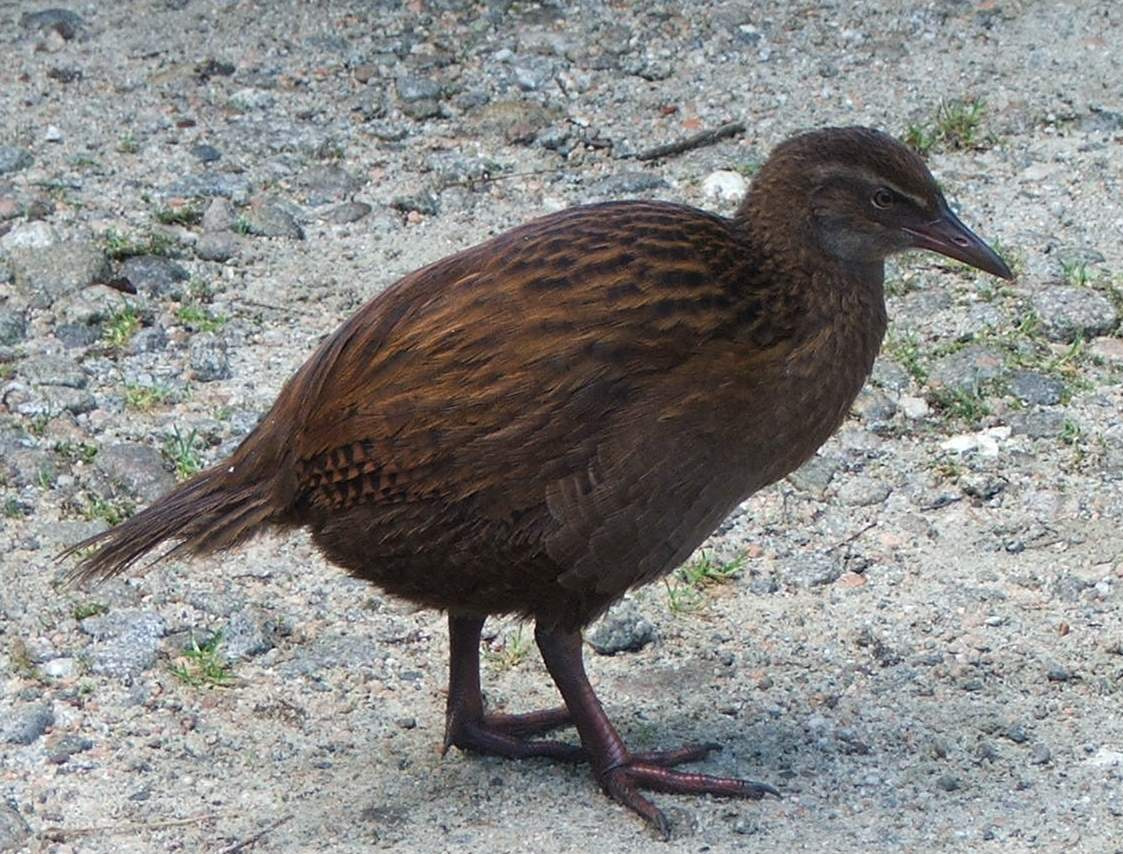
A western weka on the West Coast near Karamea

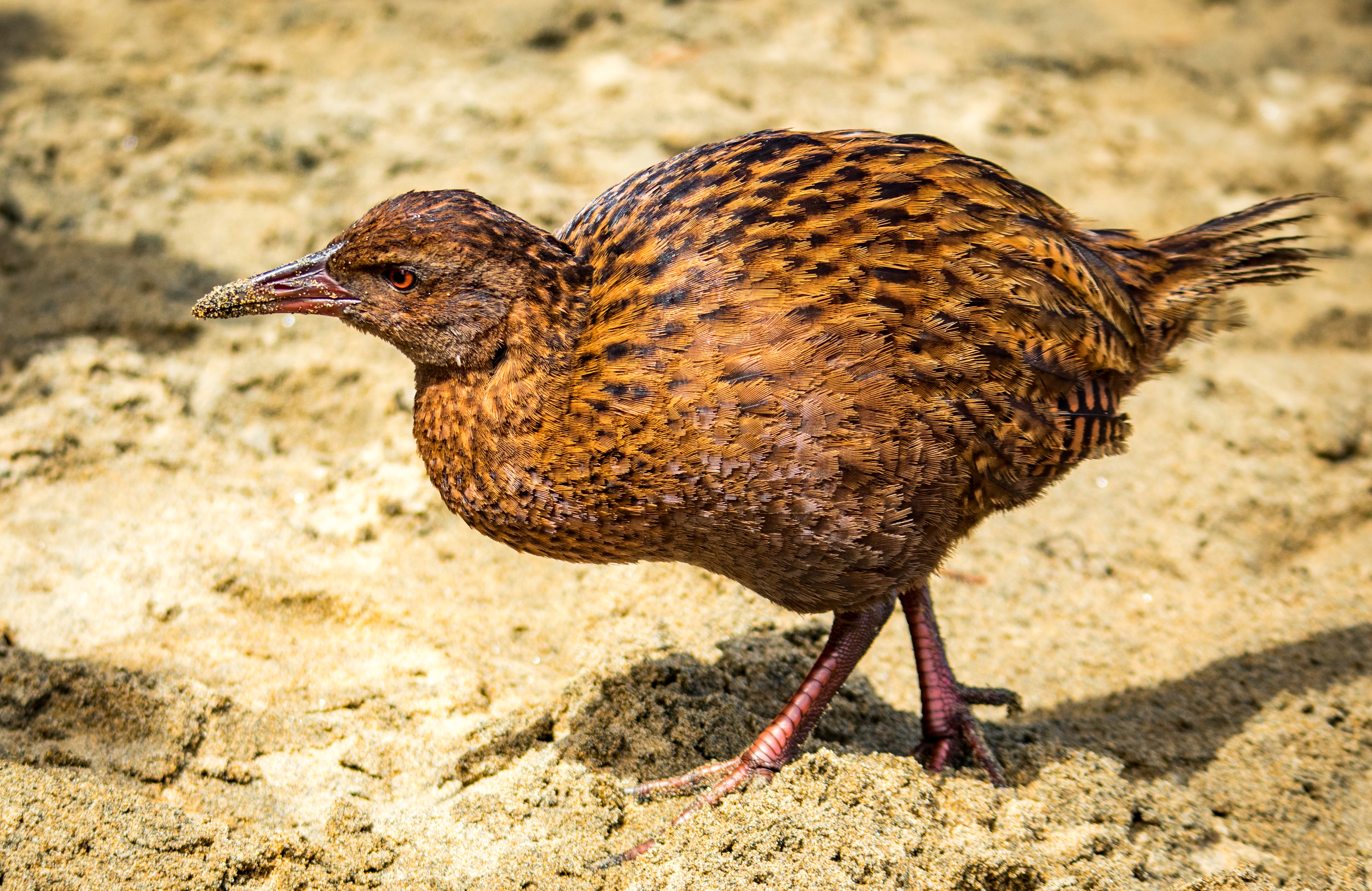
Stewart Island weka seen at Sydney Cove on Ulva Island

The nominate subspecies, the western weka (G. a. australis), is found mainly in the northern and western regions of the South Island from Nelson to Fiordland. Distinguished by dark red-brown and black streaking on the breast, the western weka has two distinct colour phases, that of the southernmost range showing a greater degree of black. The Stewart Island weka (G. a. scotti) is smaller than the other subspecies and, like the western weka, has two colour phases; a chestnut form – similar to the chestnut-phase western weka – and a black phase which is not as dark as the black western weka. Reintroduced populations are confined to Stewart Island and outliers, and to Kapiti Island to which it was introduced. Weka are host to two species of feather lice (Rallicola harrisoni and Pseudomenopon pilgrimi) which show the same north–south population structure seen in their hosts.

== Behaviour ==
=== Habitat and diet ===
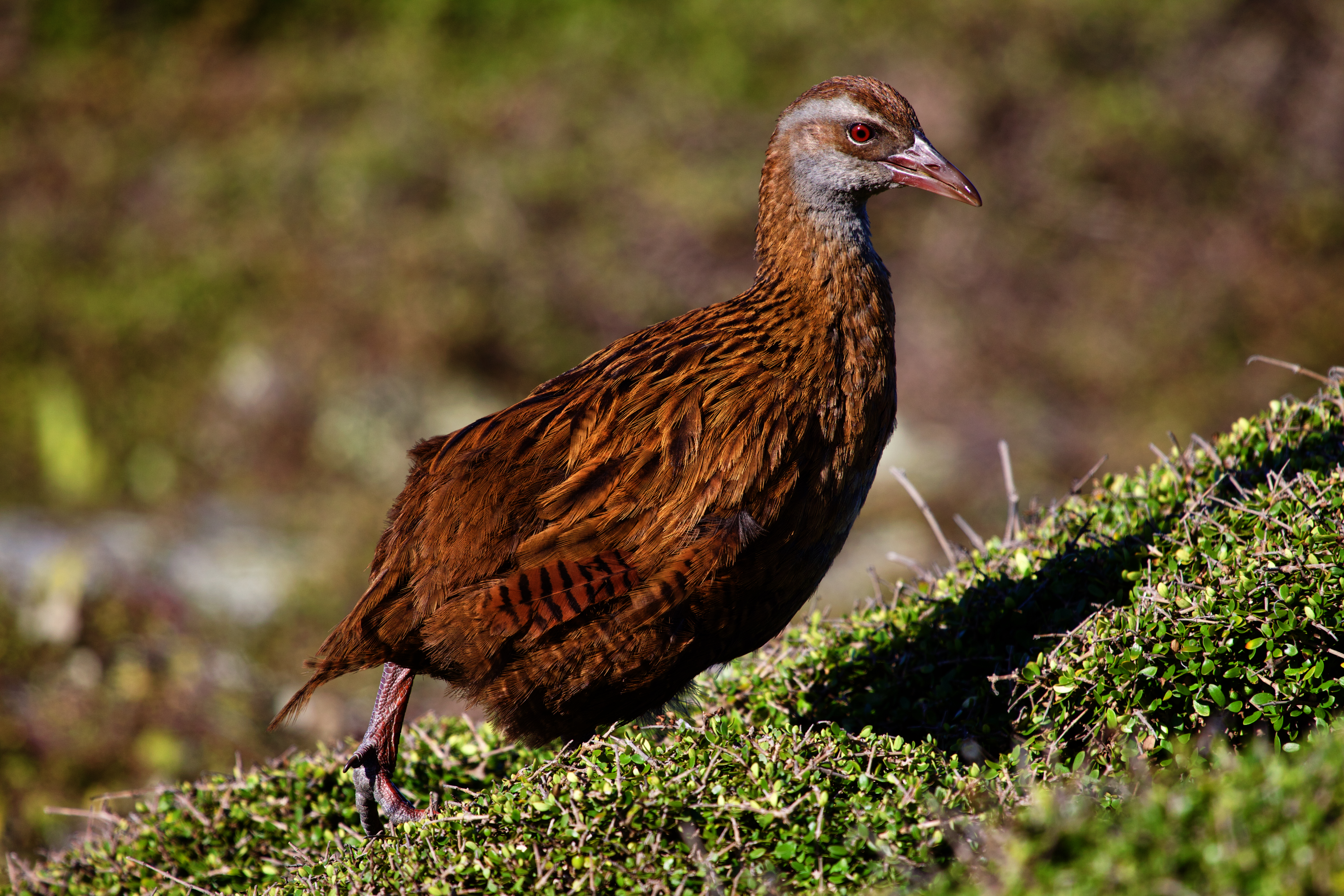
Weka in its habitat on top of a bush

Weka occupy areas such as forests, sub-alpine grassland, sand dunes, rocky shores and modified semi-urban environments. They are omnivorous, with a diet comprising 30% animal foods and 70% plant foods. Animal foods include earthworms, larvae, beetles, wētā, ants, grass grubs, slugs, snails, insect eggs, slaters, frogs, spiders, rats, mice, and small birds. Stewart Island weka (G. a. scotti) have been observed preying on sooty shearwater (Puffinus griseus) eggs and chicks.

Plant foods include leaves, grass, berries and seeds. Weka are important in the bush as seed dispersers, distributing seeds too large for smaller berry-eating birds. Where the weka is relatively common, their furtive curiosity leads them to search around houses and camps for food scraps, or anything unfamiliar and transportable. They have been known to take shiny objects in particular.

=== Breeding and Nesting ===
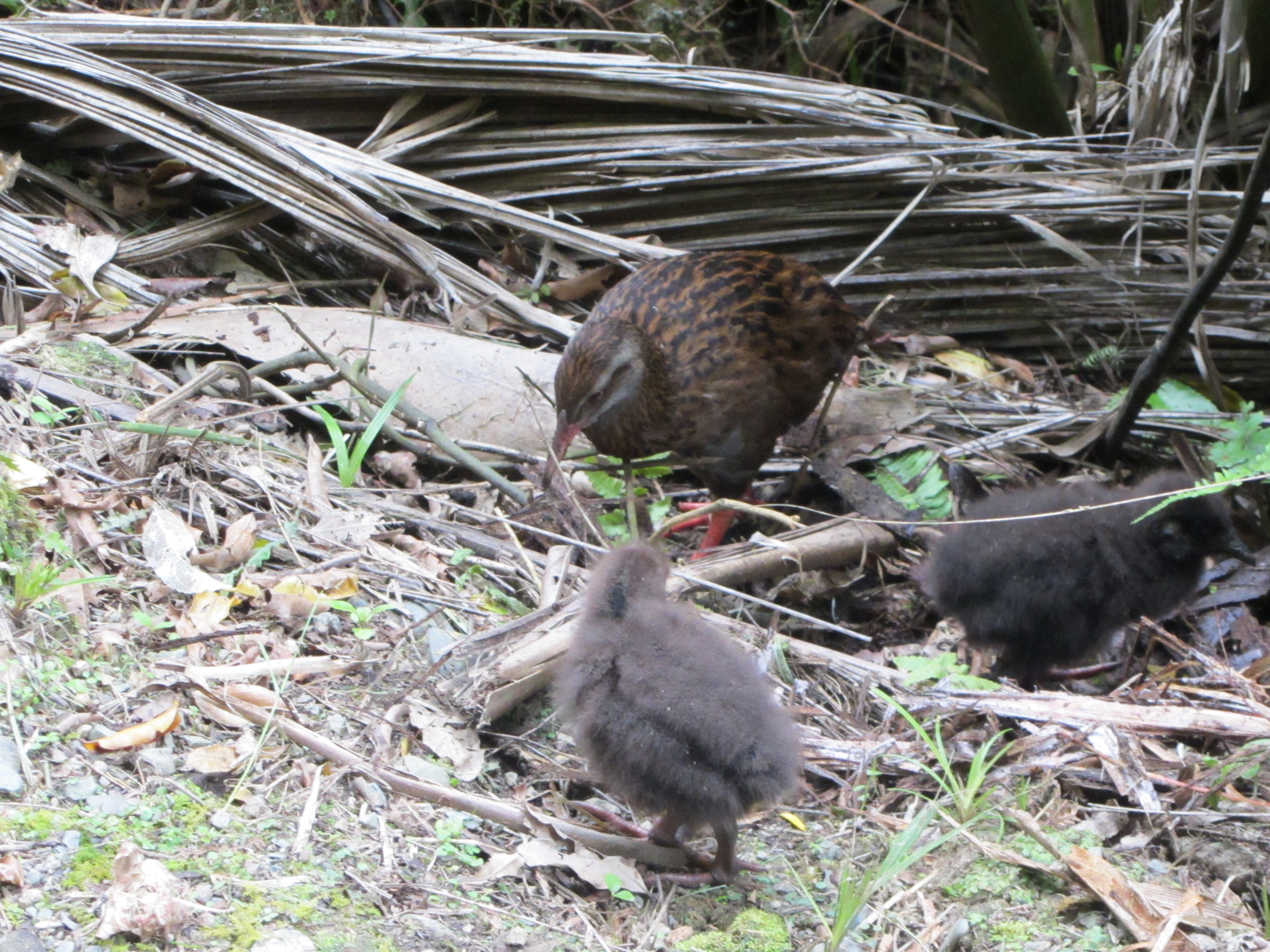
Weka and chicks

The breeding season varies, but when food is plentiful, weka can raise up to four broods throughout the whole year. Nests are made on the ground under the cover of thick vegetation, and built by making grass (or similar material) into a bowl to hold about four eggs. The eggs have mean dimensions of 57.7 mm × 39.9 mm (2.27 in × 1.57 in). On average, female weka lay three creamy or pinkish eggs blotched with brown and mauve. Both sexes incubate. The chicks hatch after a month, and are fed by both parents until fully grown between six and ten weeks.

== Conservation status ==
Weka are classed as a vulnerable species. The Department of Conservation's weka recovery plan, approved in 1999, aims to improve the conservation status of threatened weka, clarify the status of data deficient weka, maintain the non-threatened status of other weka, and eventually restore all weka to their traditional ranges as a significant component of the ecosystems.

Weka are problematic in conservation; some subspecies are threatened, but have been a problem to other threatened wildlife on offshore islands, especially when introduced to an island that they would not naturally inhabit. Weka are unable to withstand the current pressures faced in both the North Island and South Island. However, they can be very productive in good conditions and high food availability. Year-round breeding has been recorded at several sites with up to 14 young produced in a year. Weka populations can persist in highly modified habitats, but they have disappeared from huge areas of their former range, suggesting that they can adapt to a wide range of conditions but are particularly vulnerable to threats.

=== Threats ===
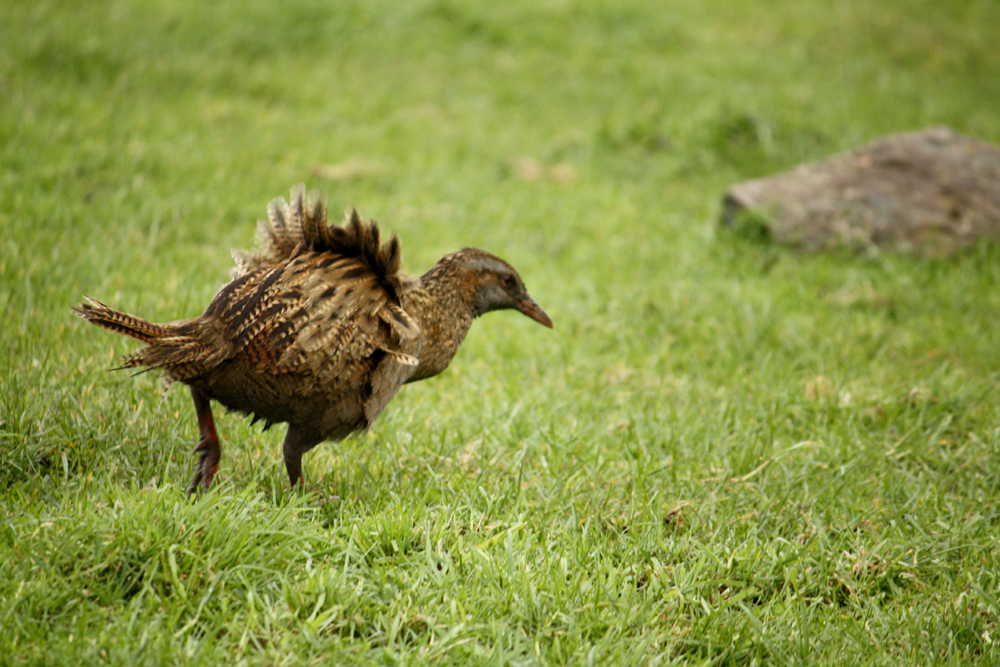
A ruffled weka on Chatham Island

The Department of Conservation identifies eight main threats to weka. Predation by ferrets, cats, and dogs is a threat to adult weka; stoats and ferrets are a threat to chicks; stoats and rats are a threat to eggs. It faces competition with introduced species for fruits and invertebrates, and suffers from the impact browsers have on forest composition and regeneration. Habitat depletion is caused by the modification and degradation of forests and wetlands. Diseases and parasites have been associated with population declines, although little is known. Drought has been implicated in the disappearance of weka from some areas. In some regions, motor vehicles cause a significant amount of roadkill death. Pest control operations sometimes kill weka, as they have ground foraging habits vulnerable to poison baits, and traps are laid in a way that weka can reach. Genetic diversity can be lost during the transmission of genes through generations, affecting isolated populations.

== Human interaction ==
Weka are significant to some Māori iwi (tribes) who admire their curiosity and feisty, bold personality traits which have led to them being relatively easy to catch. Weka were used by the Māori as a source of food, perfume, oil to treat inflammations, feathers in clothing and lures to catch dogs. Early European explorers and settlers frequently encountered and utilised weka; they were called "bush hens".

=== Incidents ===
In October 2023 a two-person team competing in the reality show Race to Survive: New Zealand were disqualified after one killed and ate a weka in what he claimed was an act of desperation and hunger, despite knowing it was a protected species. They were also issued with a letter of reprimand from the Department of Conservation.
