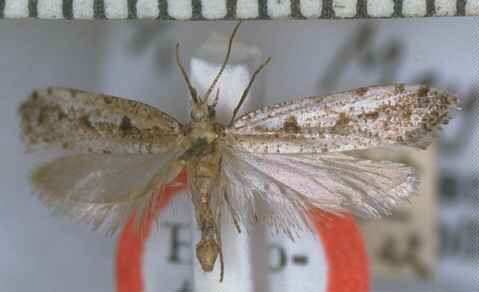
- Male holotype

Scientific classification
- Kingdom: Animalia
- Phylum: Arthropoda
- Clade: Pancrustacea
- Class: Insecta
- Order: Lepidoptera
- Family: Plutellidae
- Genus: Orthenches
- Species: O. chartularia

Binomial name
- Orthenches chartularia Meyrick, 1924

Synonyms
- Orthenches nivalis Philpott, 1927

= Orthenches chartularia =

Species of moth endemic to New Zealand

Orthenches chartularia is a moth of the family Plutellidae first described by Edward Meyrick in 1924. It is endemic to New Zealand and can be found in the North and South Islands. This species inhabits open grassy areas in native subalpine forest. Adults are on the wing in January and February.

== Taxonomy ==
This species was first described by Edward Meyrick in 1924 and named Orthenches chartularia using a male specimen collected in January at Mount Ruapehu at 4,000 ft. by George Hudson. In 1927 Alfred Philpott, believing he was describing a new species, described this species and named it Orthenches nivalis. Philpott used a specimen collected at Arthur's Pass in February. George Hudson discussed and illustrated this species in his 1928 book The butterflies and moths of New Zealand. Philpott corrected his error in 1931, synonymising O. nivalis with O. chartularia. The male holotype specimen is held at the Natural History Museum, London.

== Description ==
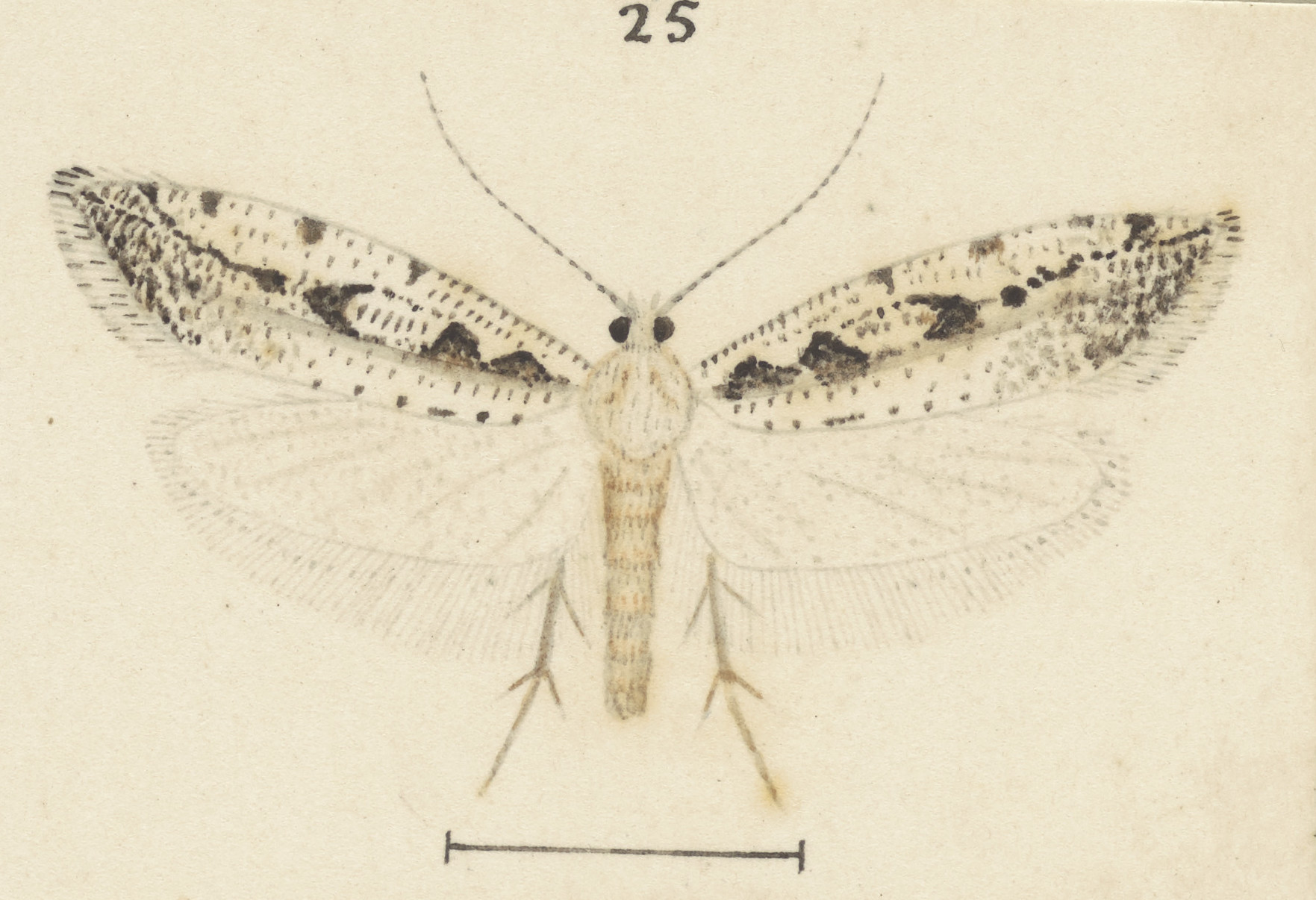
Illustration by George Hudson.

Meyrick described this species as follows:

♂. 16 mm. Head and thorax whitish. Palpi dark grey, tips of second and terminal joints white. Forewings elongate, apex obtuse-pointed, termen slightly rounded, rather strongly oblique; whitish, irregularly strewn with dark-fuscous strigulae partially mixed with grey suffusion; four small dark-fuscous spots on costa from before middle to 5/6, and four somewhat larger in a median longitudinal series from 1/3 to 5/6; four dark-fuscous dots on posterior half of dorsum: cilia whitish, a grey basal shade, at apex a grey bar. Hindwings grey-whitish; cilia whitish.

Hudson pointed out that this species is variable in the intensity and extent of the black markings on its forewings.

== Distribution and habitat ==
This species is endemic to New Zealand and can be found in the North and South Islands. The preferred habitat of this species is open grassy areas in native subalpine forest.

== Behaviour ==
Adults of this species are on the wing in January and February.
