= Pigeon Island (New Zealand) =

Island in New Zealand

Pigeon Island / Wāwāhi Waka
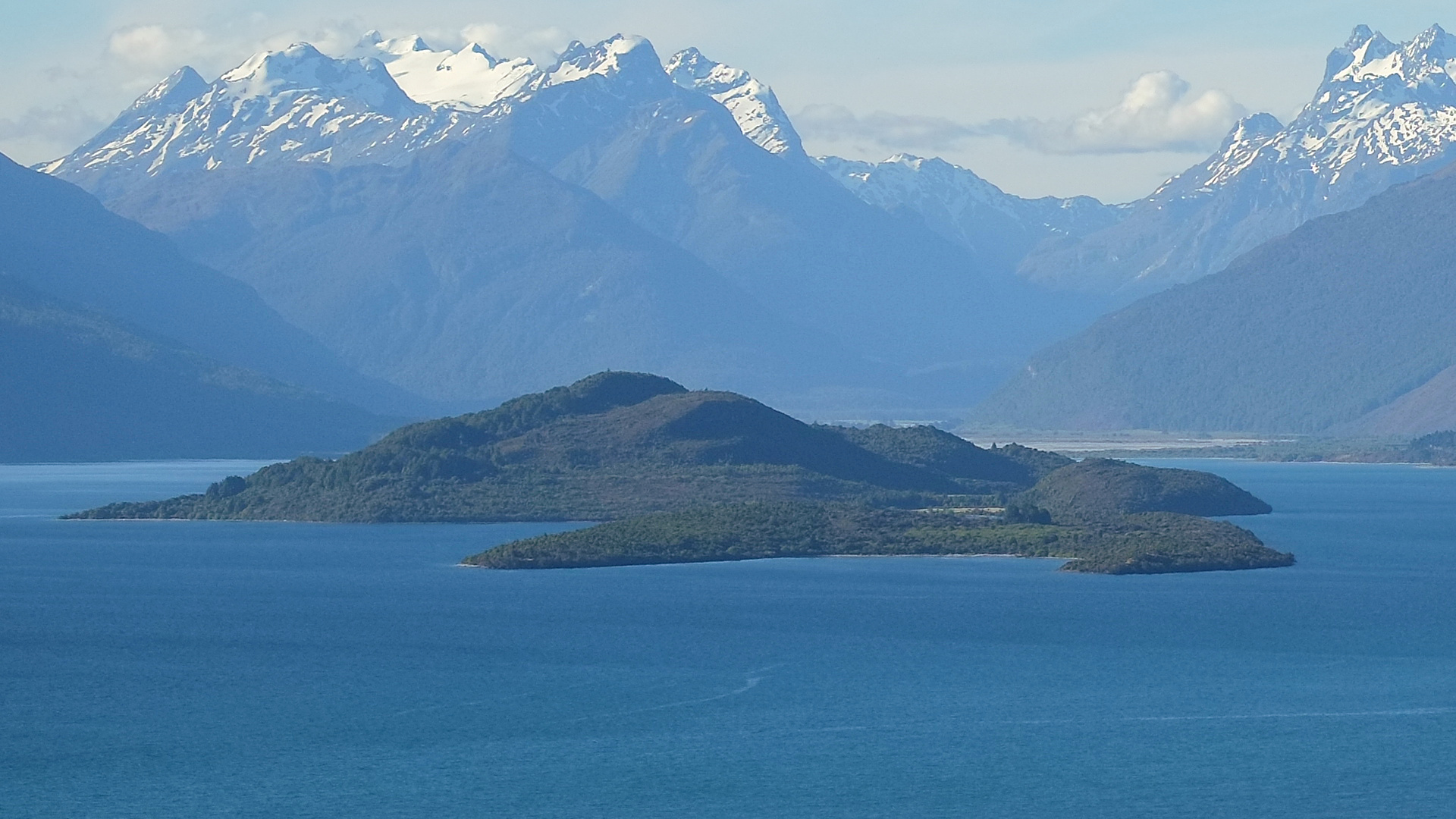
- Pigeon Island / Wāwāhi Waka in Lake Wakatipu

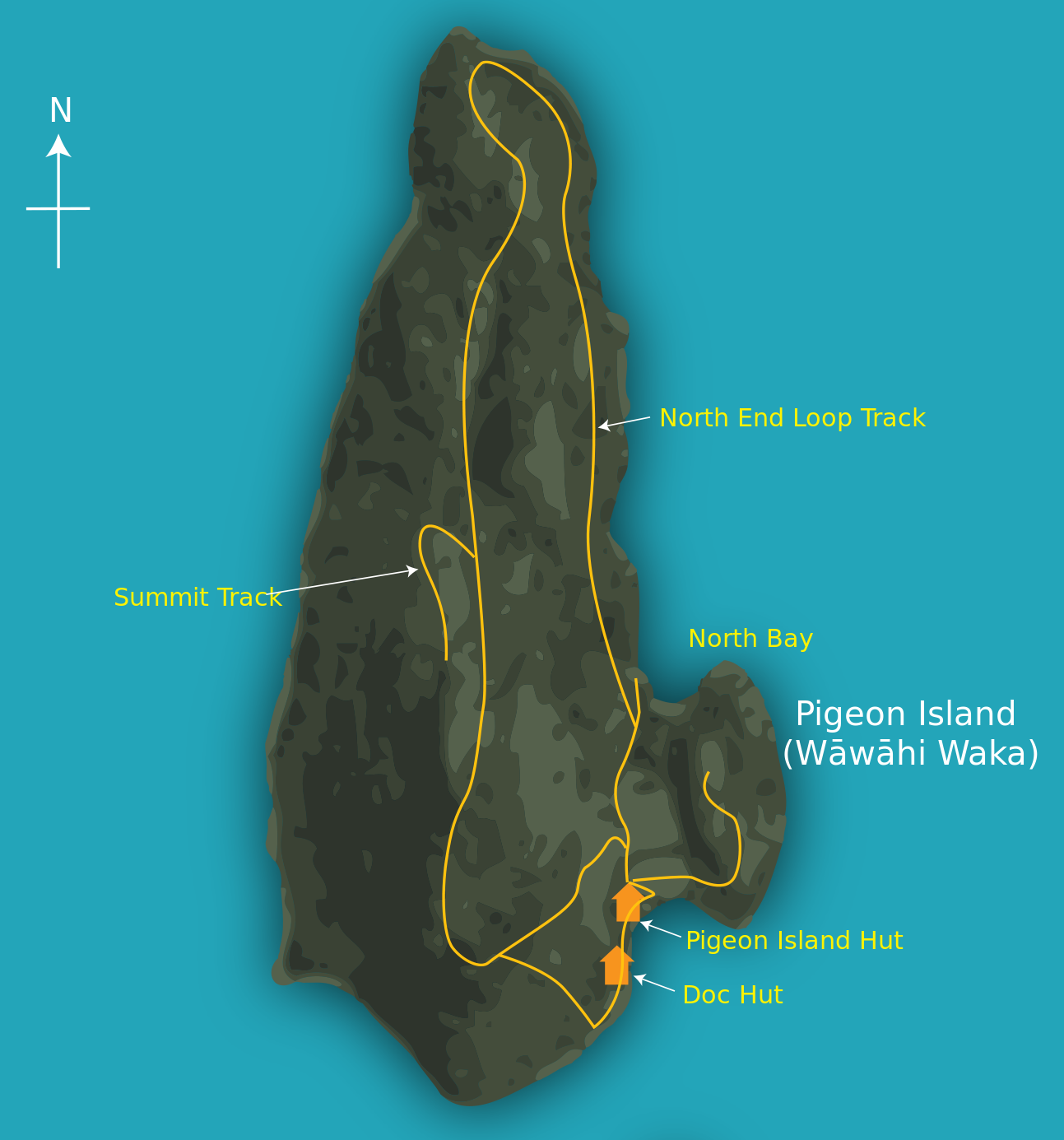
- Aerial graphic of Pigeon Island / Wāwāhi Waka

Geography
- Coordinates: 44°55′20″S 168°23′50″E
- Total islands: 1
- Area: 1.7 km^{2} (0.66 sq mi)

Administration
- New Zealand

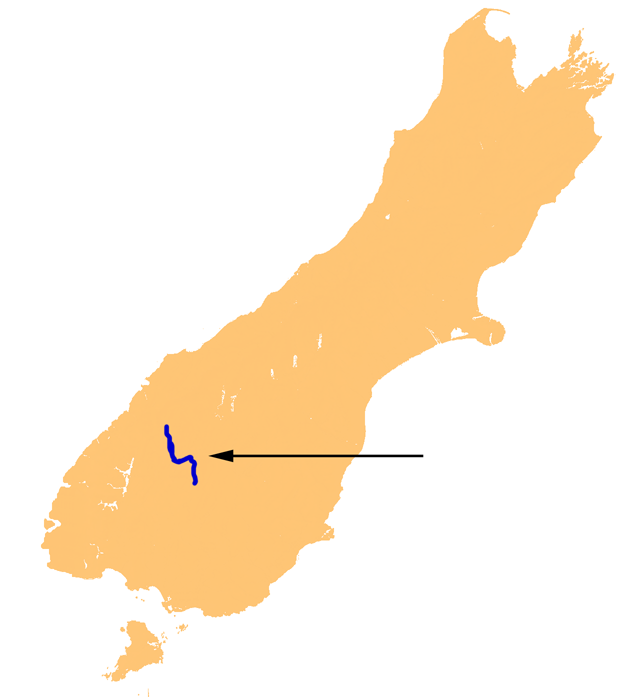
Lake Wakatipu

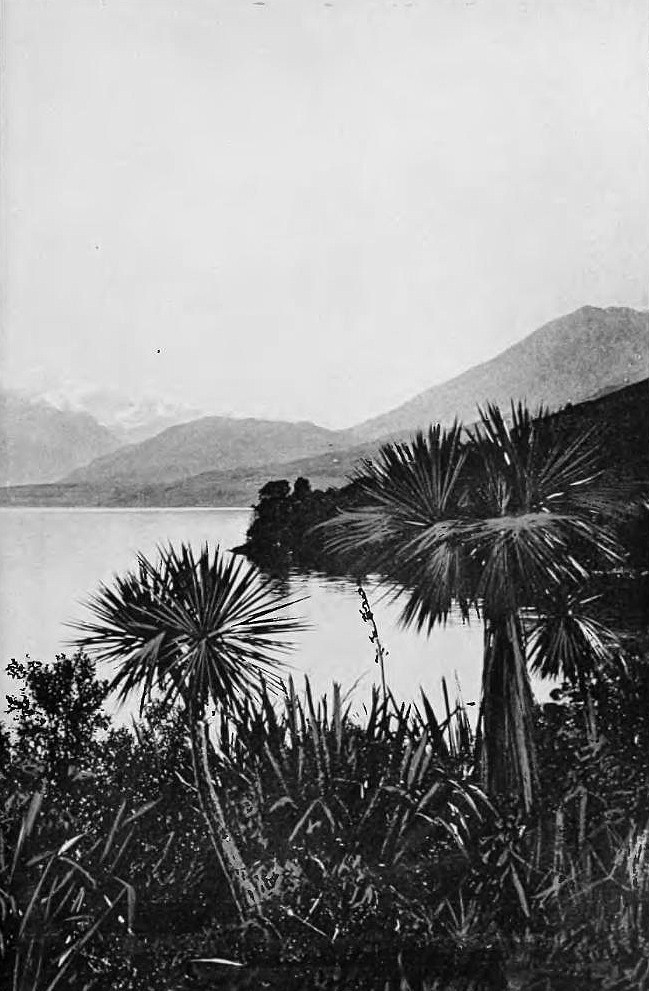
Pigeon Island photo from 1913

Pigeon Island / Wāwāhi Waka is an island in the northern reaches of New Zealand's Lake Wakatipu, near the township of Glenorchy. It is 170 hectares in size and is the largest island in the lake. In 1884, during Queen Victoria's reign, it was gifted by the Crown as a reserve to the people of Queenstown district for their use and enjoyment.

There are several walking tracks around the island which makes it easy to navigate to most parts of the island.

Because its proximity to the lake creates a mild climate it is the only place in the Wakatipu Basin in which naturally occurring kahikatea can be found.

== Flora and fauna ==
Several native New Zealand birds can be found on Pigeon Island / Wāwāhi Waka, including tūī, kererū, bellbird, pipipi and yellow-crowned parakeet. Buff weka were translocated from Stevensons Island in 2006 and are now commonly seen.

As well as kahikatea (white pine) other native tree species include: miro, mataī, rātā, mistletoe and red beech.

== Restoration ==
The Wakatipu Islands Reforestation Trust was set up in 1999 to replant native trees on the Lake Wakatipu Islands concentrating on Pigeon Island mainly. Many volunteers have made the trip to the island since this time to replant trees such as rimu, kahikatea and beech. The aim is to restore the islands to their natural state without introduced predators such as stoats and rats, including the reintroduction of bird and insects, the most successful so far being the buff weka translocation programme.

== Threats ==
Fire has been a serious threat to the island with large areas burnt in incidents in 1996 and 2003. These fires have usually been attributed to open fires lit by people camping on or near the beach but no one has been prosecuted for this. Many large trees including red beech and kahikatea were destroyed, slowing down the regeneration attempts of the islands vegetation. The charred remains of the trunks can still be seen in many places.

In 2009 it was discovered someone had used a chainsaw to remove parts of a rata tree. Taking anything from the island is illegal and can compromise its status as a protected sanctuary. It was discovered later in the year the damage was done by two men who had to pay $3000 in costs.

== See also ==
- Desert island
- List of islands
