= Sentinel Peak (Tulare County, California) =

Mountain in Tulare County, California

- Location within California Location within the United States

Highest point
- Elevation: 6,143 ft (1,872 m) NAVD 88
- Coordinates: 36°00′57″N 118°31′36″W

Geography
- Location: Tulare County, California, U.S.
- Parent range: Sierra Nevada
- Topo map: USGS Sentinel Peak

Climbing
- Easiest route: Trail hike

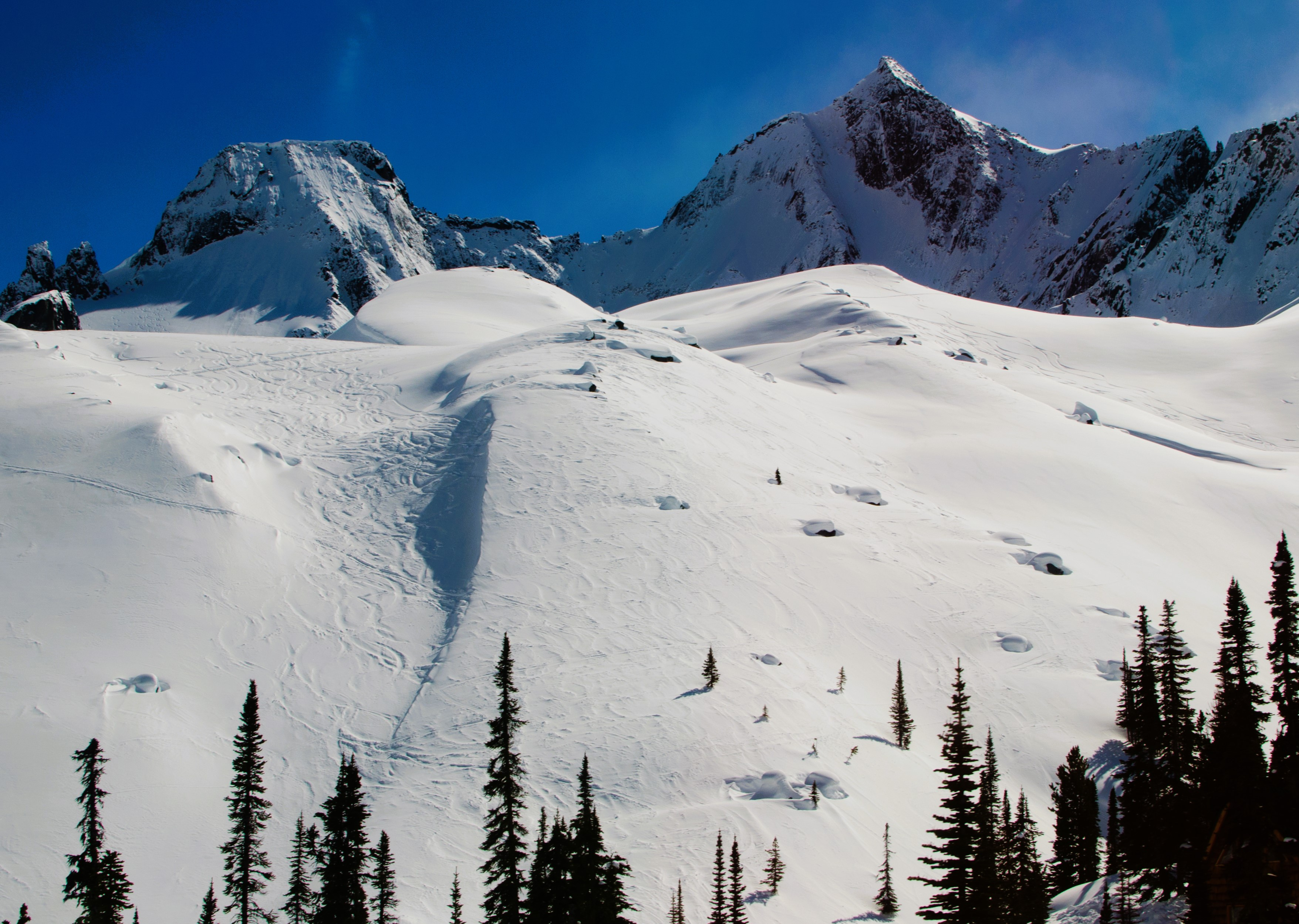

Sentinel Peak is located near Johnsondale, California. It is a popular with Boy Scouts visiting Camp Whitsett, with several hundred scouts hiking the mountain each week in the summer. It is in Giant Sequoia National Monument and Sequoia National Forest.
