= Sentinel Peak (Inyo County, California) =

Mountain in California, United States

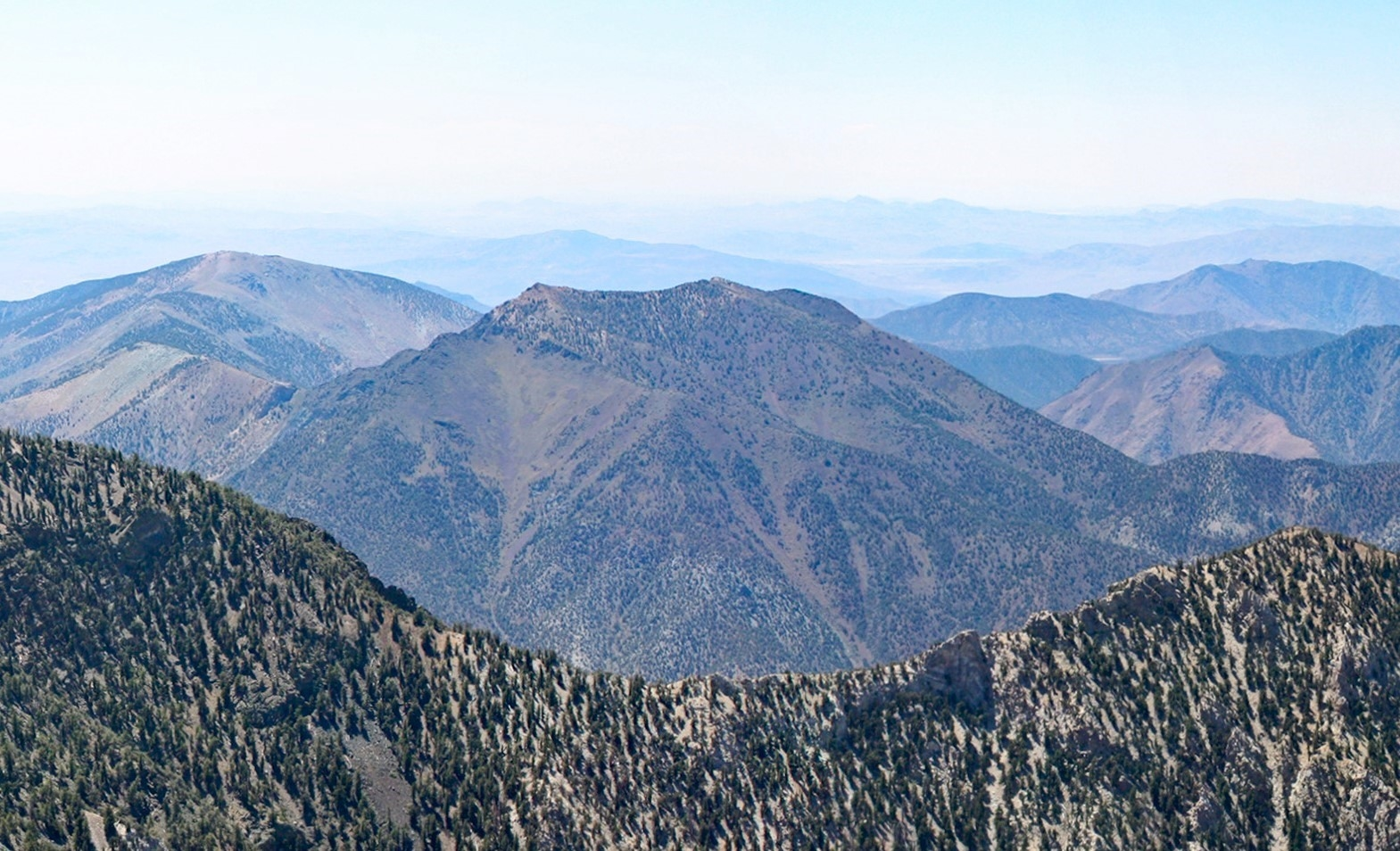
- North aspect, centered

Highest point
- Elevation: 9,634 ft (2,936 m) NAVD 88
- Prominence: 1,574 ft (480 m)
- Parent peak: Telescope Peak
- Isolation: 5.12 mi (8.24 km)
- Coordinates: 36°05′48″N 117°04′40″W

Geography
- Location within California Location within the United States
- Country: United States
- State: California
- County: Inyo
- Protected area: Death Valley National Park
- Parent range: Panamint Range
- Topo map: USGS Sentinel Peak

Climbing
- Easiest route: Trail hike

Sentinel Peak is a 9,634-foot-elevation (2,936-meter) summit in Inyo County, California, United States. It is located near Panamint City, California. Sentinel Peak is the sixth-highest mountain of the Panamint Range, and it is set within Death Valley National Park and the Mojave Desert. Precipitation runoff from this mountain's east slope drains to Death Valley via Johnson Canyon, whereas the west slope drains to Panamint Valley via Happy and Surprise canyons.

== See also ==
- Geology of the Death Valley area
- Mountains of Death Valley National Park
