= Stevensons Island =

Island in New Zealand

Native name: Te Peka Karara
- Interactive map of Stevensons Island

Geography
- Coordinates: 44.595°S 169.135°E
- Total islands: 3
- Area: 0.65 km^{2} (0.25 sq mi)
- Highest elevation: 325 m (1066 ft)

Administration
- New Zealand

Demographics
- Population: 0

Stevensons Island (Te Peka Karara) is a small 65-hectare (160-acre) island in the Stevensons Arm section of Lake Wānaka, New Zealand. There are two small islets close to the south end of the island.

Buff weka were introduced to Stevensons Island in 2002 from the Chatham Islands. In 2009 they were removed due to a rabbit outbreak that attracted predators which killed four birds. They were then reintroduced in 2013.

== See also ==
- Desert island
- List of islands
