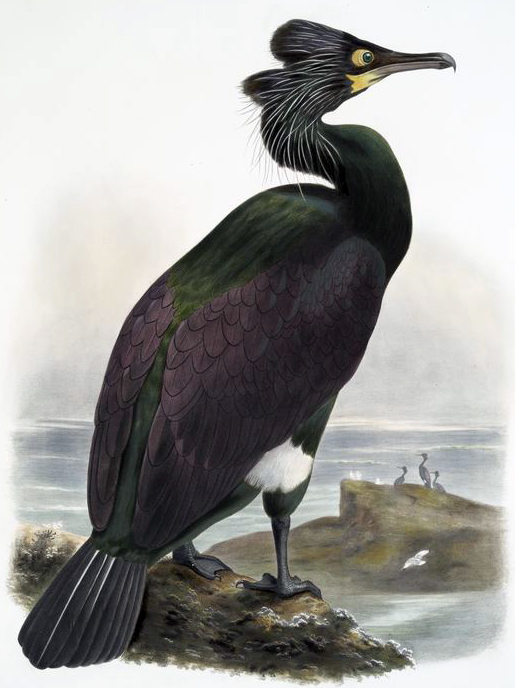
- Illustration by Joseph Wolf

Conservation status
- Extinct (c. 1850) (IUCN 3.1)

Scientific classification
- Kingdom: Animalia
- Phylum: Chordata
- Class: Aves
- Order: Suliformes
- Family: Phalacrocoracidae
- Genus: Urile
- Species: †U. perspicillatus

Binomial name
- †Urile perspicillatus (Pallas, 1811)

Synonyms
- Phalacrocorax perspicillatus Pallas, 1811; Graculus perspicillatus Elliot, 1869; Pallasicarbo perspicillatus Coues, 1869; Carbo perspicillatus Rothschild, 1907; Compsohalieus perspicillatus

= Spectacled cormorant =

Extinct species of bird

The spectacled cormorant or Pallas's cormorant (Urile perspicillatus) is an extinct cormorant species that inhabited Bering Island and possibly other places in the Commander Islands and the nearby coast of Kamchatka in the far northeast of Russia. The modern distribution was shown to be a relict of a wider prehistoric distribution in 2018 when fossils of the species from 120,000 years ago were found in Japan. It is the largest species of cormorant known to have existed.

== Taxonomy ==
It was formerly classified in the genus Phalacrocorax, but in 2021, the IOC reclassified it and several other Pacific cormorant species into the genus Urile, based on a 2014 study that supported reclassifying the Brandt's, red-faced, and pelagic cormorants into that genus. Although the spectacled cormorant was not mentioned in the 2014 study and its taxonomic position then unresolvable by the current phylogenies, it was also reclassified into Urile based on its perceived relatedness to those species. A 2026 mitochondrial DNA study confirmed its placement in the genus Urile, and found that the sequence was most closely related to that of Brandt's cormorant among Urile species.

== Description ==
Turnaround video of a specimen, Naturalis Biodiversity Center

The species was first identified by Georg Wilhelm Steller in 1741 on Vitus Bering's disastrous second Kamchatka expedition. He described the bird as large, clumsy and almost flightless – though it was probably reluctant to fly rather than physically unable – and wrote "they weighed 12–14 pounds, so that one single bird was sufficient for three starving men." Though cormorants are normally notoriously bad-tasting, Steller says that this bird tasted delicious, particularly when it was cooked in the way of the native Kamchadals, who encased the whole bird in clay, buried it, and baked it in a heated pit.

With a body mass estimated to be from 3.5 to 6.8 kg (7.7 to 15.0 lb) and a length up to around 100 cm (39 in), the spectacled cormorant was rather larger than all other known cormorants. In a similar fashion to the extant flightless cormorant, which may have rivaled it in length but not weight, the spectacled cormorant is thought to have at least largely lost the power of flight which is borne out by the reduced sternum and wing chord of museum specimens. This species was largely glossy black in color with a reported greenish gloss that may have been fairly vivid in bright light.

A contrasting large white patch could be seen on its lower flanks just above the legs. Like other cormorants, they had small patches of bare skin about the face including a small gular patch and a small amount of bare skin around the eyes; these areas usually appeared to have been dull-yellow or grayish in hue, but during breeding stages, they may have changed to a bright orangey-reddish hue. During breeding stages, they also had a prominent crest on their head. The bare skin around the eyes, as well as the crest, were not present in females.

== Extinction ==
Apart from the fact that it fed on fish, almost nothing else is known about the life history of this bird. The population declined quickly after further visitors to the area started collecting the birds for food and feathers. Their reports of profitable whaling grounds and large populations of Arctic foxes and other animals with valuable pelts led to a massive influx of whalers and fur traders into the region; the last birds were reported to have lived around 1850 on Kamen Ariy (Russian: Камень Арий) islet, off the northwestern tip of Bering Island.

Only seven known specimens are currently preserved in public collections, with all specimens collected and given away by the same individual. None of these specimens are available on public display.

A presumed prehistoric record from Amchitka Island, Alaska, is based on misidentification of double-crested cormorant remains.

== See also ==
- List of extinct birds
- List of extinct animals of Asia
- Steller's sea cow
