= Little shag =

Little shag may refer to:

- Little pied cormorant, or little [pied] shag (Phalacrocorax melanoleucos)
- Little black cormorant, or little black shag (Phalacrocorax sulcirostris)
- Little cormorant (Phalacrocorax niger)
