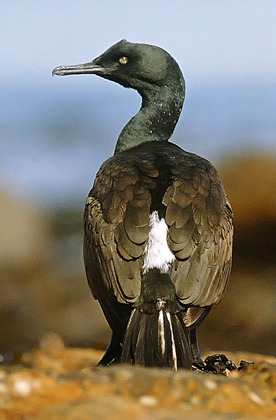

Conservation status
- Endangered (IUCN 3.1)

Scientific classification
- Kingdom: Animalia
- Phylum: Chordata
- Class: Aves
- Order: Suliformes
- Family: Phalacrocoracidae
- Genus: Phalacrocorax
- Species: P. neglectus

Binomial name
- Phalacrocorax neglectus (Wahlberg, 1855)
- resident range

= Bank cormorant =

Species of bird

The bank cormorant (Phalacrocorax neglectus), also known as Wahlberg's cormorant, is a medium-sized cormorant that is endemic to Namibia and the western seaboard of South Africa, living in and around coastal waters; it is rarely recorded more than 15 km offshore.

== Description ==
The bank cormorant is a heavy-bodied bird, roughly 75 cm in length. It is generally black in appearance with a bronze sheen, though the wings are a dark brown rather than a true black. Adults have a small crest on their heads, and normally have a white rump. Pale eyes in an all black face are considered to be distinctive for adults, with immature birds having dark eyes.

== Ecology ==
A prime food for these birds is the cape rock lobster Jasus lalandii, and their feeding distribution closely matches the kelp beds where these lobsters live, though the birds will also take a variety of other crustacean and fish prey, notably bearded goby Sufflogobius bibarbatus.

The birds may breed at any time of the year, laying two or three chalky-white eggs in a nest constructed from seaweed and guano.

== Conservation ==
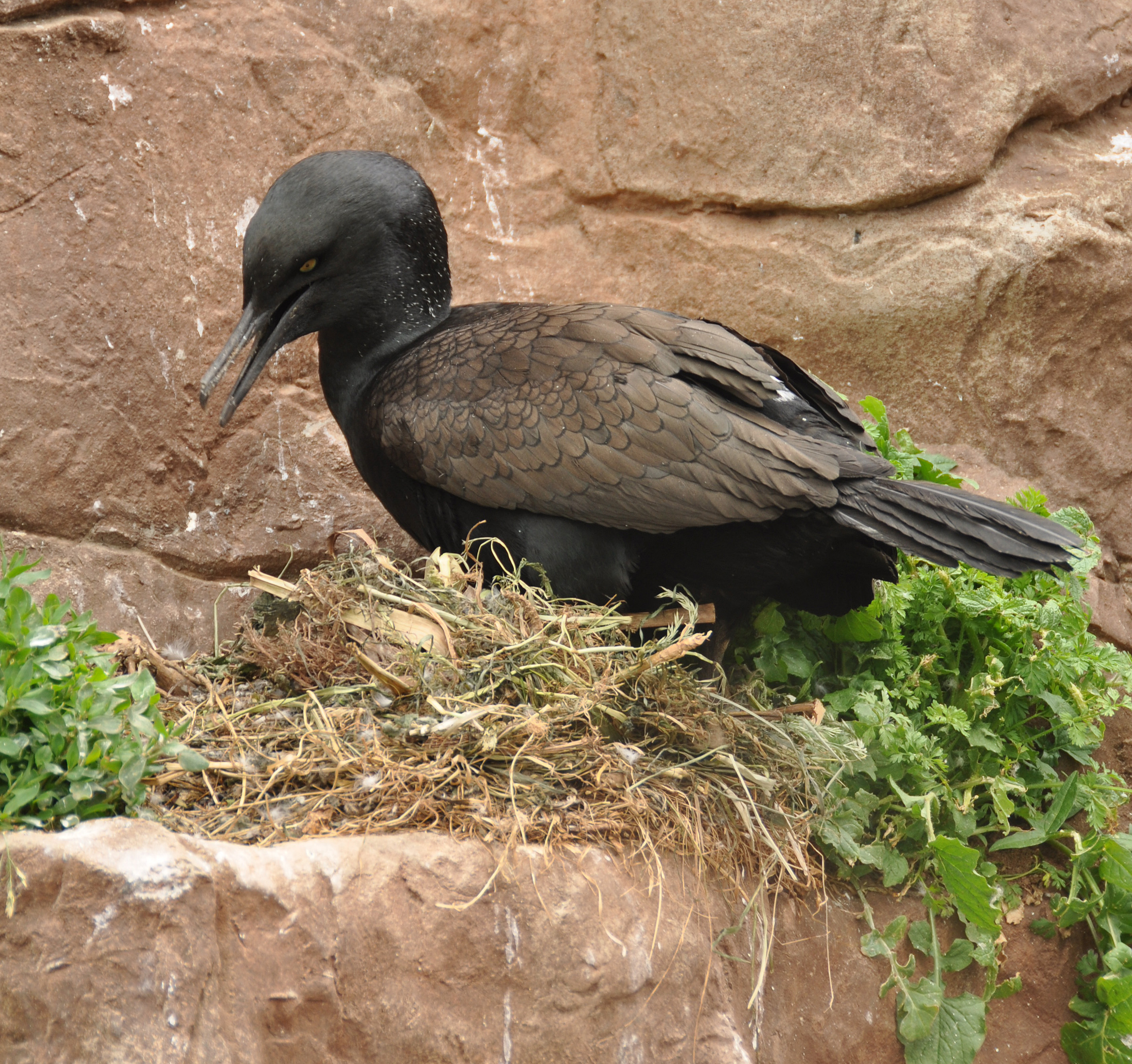
Nesting in captivity

Numbers of these birds have been declining sharply in recent decades, partly because of commercial fishing for bearded goby, partly because of increasing human disturbance, and partly because numbers of kelp gulls have been increasing because of human provisioning, and the gulls are active predators on the cormorant eggs and chicks. The world population is probably now around 4,000 birds. The most important population centres are in Mercury Island and Ichaboe Island in Namibia.
