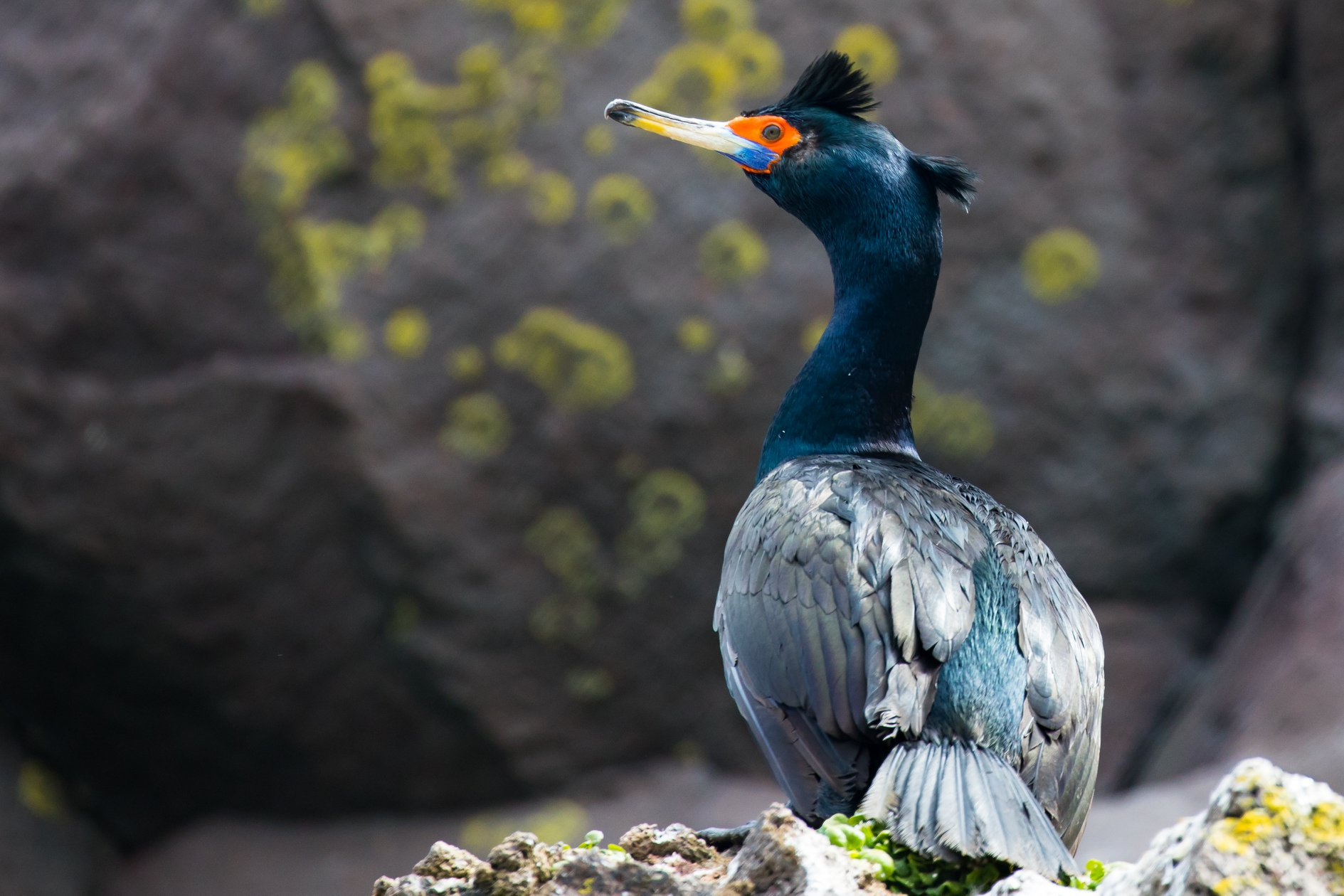

Conservation status
- Least Concern (IUCN 3.1)

Scientific classification
- Kingdom: Animalia
- Phylum: Chordata
- Class: Aves
- Order: Suliformes
- Family: Phalacrocoracidae
- Genus: Urile
- Species: U. urile

Binomial name
- Urile urile (Gmelin, JF, 1789)
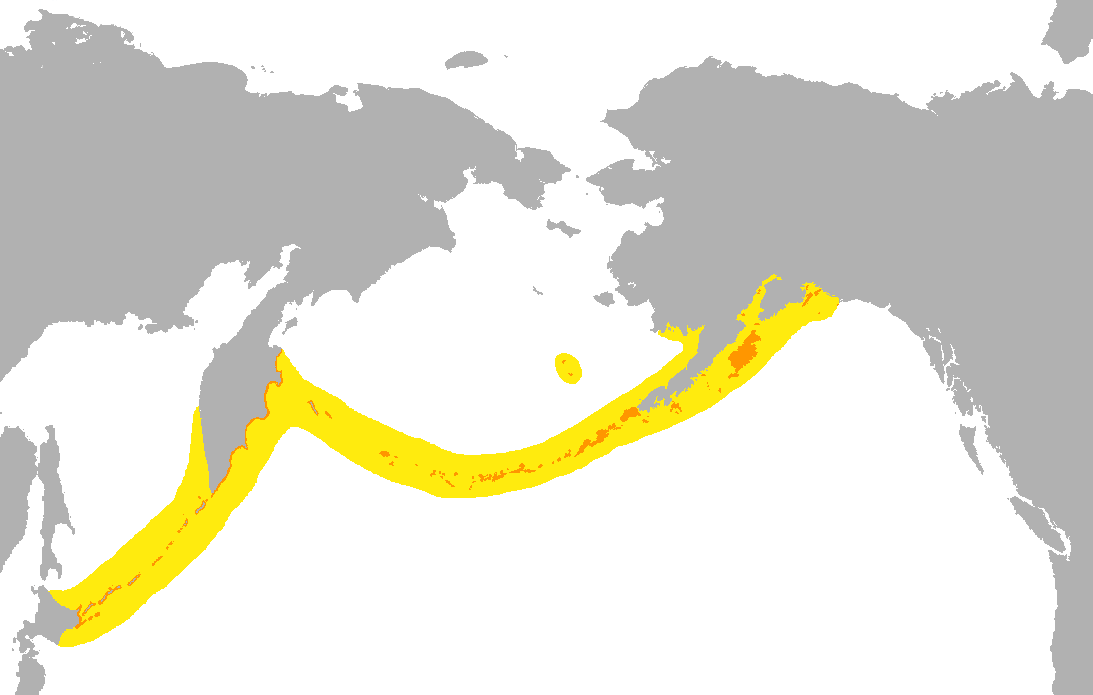
- Approximate range

Synonyms
- Phalacrocorax urile

= Red-faced cormorant =

Species of bird

The red-faced cormorant (Urile urile), red-faced shag or violet shag, is a bird species of the family Phalacrocoracidae.

Its range spans from the eastern tip of Hokkaidō in Japan, northern korean peninsula, via the Kuril Islands, the southern tip of the Kamchatka Peninsula and the Aleutian Arc to the Alaska Peninsula and Gulf of Alaska.

== Taxonomy ==
The red-faced cormorant was formally described in 1789 by the German naturalist Johann Friedrich Gmelin in his revised and expanded edition of Carl Linnaeus's Systema Naturae. He placed it in the genus Pelecanus and coined the binomial name Pelecanus urile. Gmelin based his description on the "red faced shag" of John Latham and the "red faced corvarant" of Thomas Pennant. The authors cited different translations of an account of Georg Wilhelm Steller's exploration of the Kamchatka Peninsula. The red-faced cormorant was formerly classified in the genus Phalacrocorax; it was moved to the resurrected genus Urile based on a molecular phylogenetic study published in 2014. The genus had been introduced in 1856 by the French naturalist Charles Lucien Bonaparte. The epithet urile is possibly derived from the Russian vernacular name of this species, referring to the Kuril Islands where this species is now very rare. The species is monotypic: no subspecies are recognised. Within the genus Urile the red-faced cormorant is closely related to the pelagic cormorant (Urile pelagicus).

== Description ==
The adult bird has glossy plumage that is a deep greenish blue in color, becoming purplish or bronze on the back and sides. In breeding condition it has a double crest, and white plumes on the flanks, neck and rump, and the bare facial skin of the lores and around the eyes is a bright orange or red, giving the bird its name; although the coloration is less vivid outside the breeding season, the red facial skin is enough to distinguish it from the otherwise rather similar pelagic cormorant. Its legs and feet are brownish black. Its wings range from 25 to 29 cm (9.8 to 11.4 in) in extent, with females having on average about 5 cm (2.0 in) shorter wings. Adults weigh between 1.5 and 2.3 kg (3.3 and 5.1 lb), with females averaging 350 g (12 oz) less than males.

== Behaviour ==
=== Breeding ===
Where it nests alongside the pelagic cormorant, the red-faced cormorant generally breeds the more successfully of the two species, and it is currently increasing in numbers, at least in the easterly parts of its range. It is however listed as being of conservation concern, partly because relatively little is so far known about it.

=== Food and feeding ===
Analysis of stomach contents suggests that the red-faced cormorant is mainly a bottom feeder, taking cottids especially. Adults have few predators, though river otters may attempt to take them, as will corvids of various species, bald eagles and golden eagles. Gulls and corvids are common predators on eggs and chicks.
