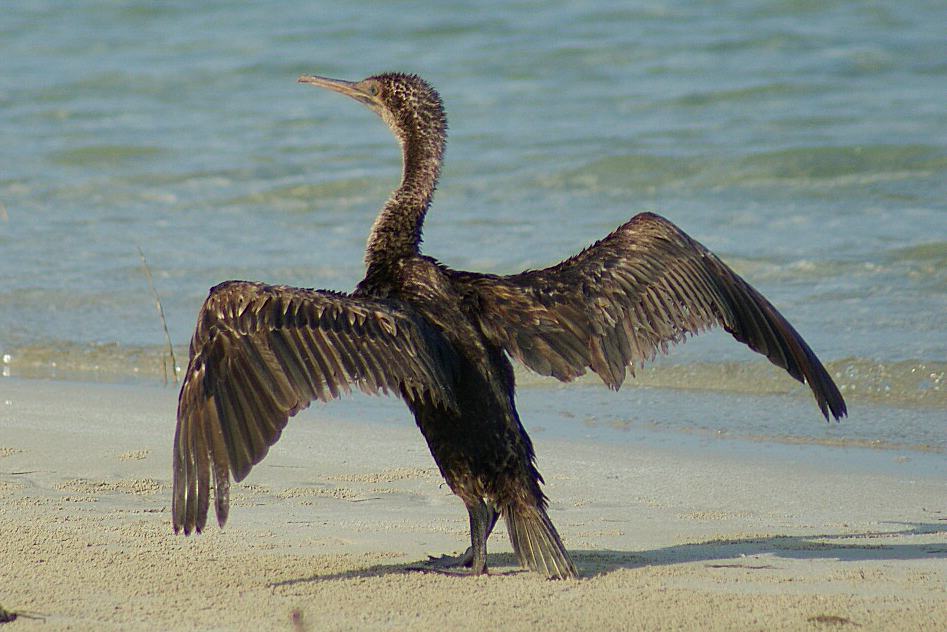

Conservation status
- Vulnerable (IUCN 3.1)

Scientific classification
- Kingdom: Animalia
- Phylum: Chordata
- Class: Aves
- Order: Suliformes
- Family: Phalacrocoracidae
- Genus: Phalacrocorax
- Species: P. nigrogularis

Binomial name
- Phalacrocorax nigrogularis Ogilvie-Grant & Forbes, HO, 1899
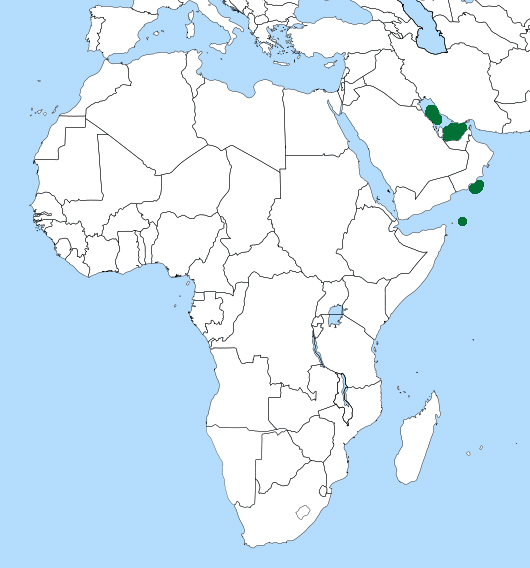

Synonyms
- Anacarbo nigrogularis

= Socotra cormorant =

Species of bird

The Socotra cormorant (Phalacrocorax nigrogularis) is a threatened species of cormorant that is endemic to the Persian Gulf and the south-east coast of the Arabian Peninsula. It is also sometimes known as the Socotran cormorant or, more rarely, as the Socotra shag. Individuals occasionally migrate as far west as the Red Sea coast. Despite its name, it was only confirmed in 2005 that it breeds on the Socotra islands in the Indian Ocean.

The Socotra cormorant is an almost entirely blackish bird with a total length of about 80 centimetres (31 in). In breeding condition, its forecrown has a purplish gloss and its upperparts have a slaty-green tinge, there are a few white plumes around the eye and neck and a few white streaks at the rump. Its legs and feet are black and its gular skin blackish. All these deviations from pure black are less marked outside the breeding season.

There is little information on this species' foraging or diet. Like all cormorants, it dives for its food. Older reports suggest that it can stay submerged for up to 3 minutes, which is high for a cormorant and suggests that it would be capable of deep diving. However, there are also reports of foraging in flocks, and this is usually seen in cormorants that feed in mid-water.

The birds are highly gregarious, with roosting flocks of 250,000 having been reported, and flocks of up to 25,000 at sea.

Some authors, such as Paul Johnsgard, place this species, along with a number of other related cormorants, in a genus Leucocarbo.

Since 2000, this species has been listed as Vulnerable on the IUCN Red List, on the grounds of its small number of breeding localities and ongoing rapid decline. The decline is caused by coastal development, disturbance and marine pollution near its nesting colonies; in 2000 it was estimated that the world population was about 110,000 breeding pairs or 330,000–500,000 individual birds. The only protected nesting colony in the Persian Gulf is one of about 30,000 pairs on the Bahraini Hawar Islands off the coast of Qatar, and this is a Ramsar Convention listed site. Of the remaining 13 colonies (9 different locations), the Hawar colony is the largest. In the northern part of its range alone, about 12 colonies are known to have disappeared since the 1960s. The birds may also be affected by oil pollution at sea. During the First Gulf War, images of badly oiled cormorants from the Gulf were regularly shown in the western media, and although the great cormorant is also found in the Persian Gulf, it is likely that many of these were Socotra cormorants.

In 2012, the Environment Agency – Abu Dhabi (EAD) monitored wild birds throughout Abu Dhabi at nearly 60 sites and recorded 420 species from 60 families. Nearly 12,000 breeding pairs of the globally threatened Socotra Cormorant were recorded at five to six small islands in the Emirate.

The Socotra cormorant is one of the species to which the Agreement on the Conservation of African-Eurasian Migratory Waterbirds (AEWA) applies.
