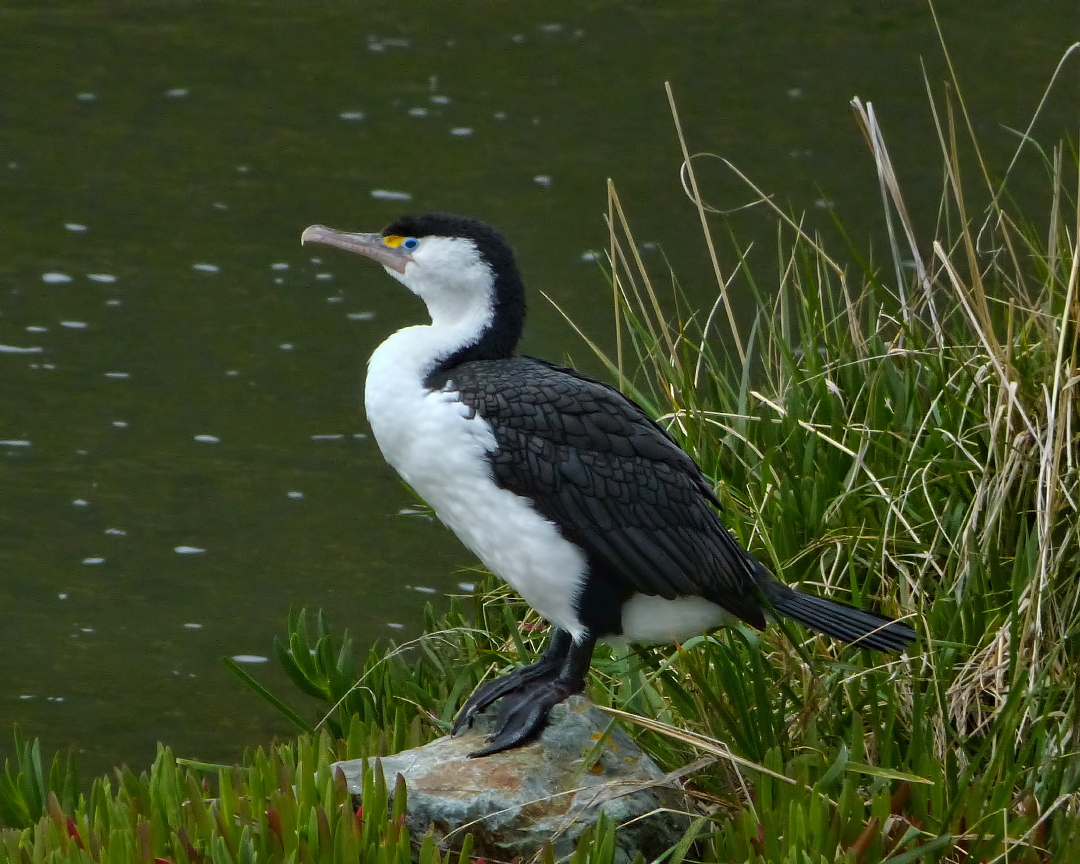
- In New Zealand

Conservation status
- Least Concern (IUCN 3.1)

Scientific classification
- Kingdom: Animalia
- Phylum: Chordata
- Class: Aves
- Order: Suliformes
- Family: Phalacrocoracidae
- Genus: Phalacrocorax
- Species: P. varius

Binomial name
- Phalacrocorax varius (Gmelin, 1789)

Synonyms
- Stictocarbo varius

= Australian pied cormorant =

Species of bird

The Australian pied cormorant (Phalacrocorax varius), also known as the pied cormorant, pied shag, or great pied cormorant, is a medium-sized member of the cormorant family. It is found around the coasts of Australasia. In New Zealand, it is usually known either as the pied shag or by its Māori name of kāruhiruhi. Older sources may refer to it as the "yellow-faced cormorant".

== Taxonomy ==
The Australian pied cormorant was formally described in 1789 by the German naturalist Johann Friedrich Gmelin in his revised and expanded edition of Carl Linnaeus's Systema Naturae. He placed it in the genus Pelecanus and coined the binomial name Pelecanus varius. Gmelin based his description on the "pied shag" from Queen Charlotte Sound, New Zealand, that had been described in 1785 by English ornithologist John Latham in his book A General Synopsis of Birds. Latham had based his own description on a specimen in the Leverian Museum and on a watercolour by Georg Forster that belonged to Joseph Banks. Forster had accompanied James Cook on his second voyage to the Pacific Ocean. The Australian pied cormorant is now one of 12 species placed in the genus Phalacrocorax that was introduced in 1760 by the French zoologist Mathurin Jacques Brisson.

Two subspecies are recognised:

- P. v. hypoleucos (Brandt, JF, 1837) – coastal and inland Australia (except central-south) and Tasmania
- P. v. varius (Gmelin, JF, 1789) – coastal North, South and Stewart Island (New Zealand)

== Description ==
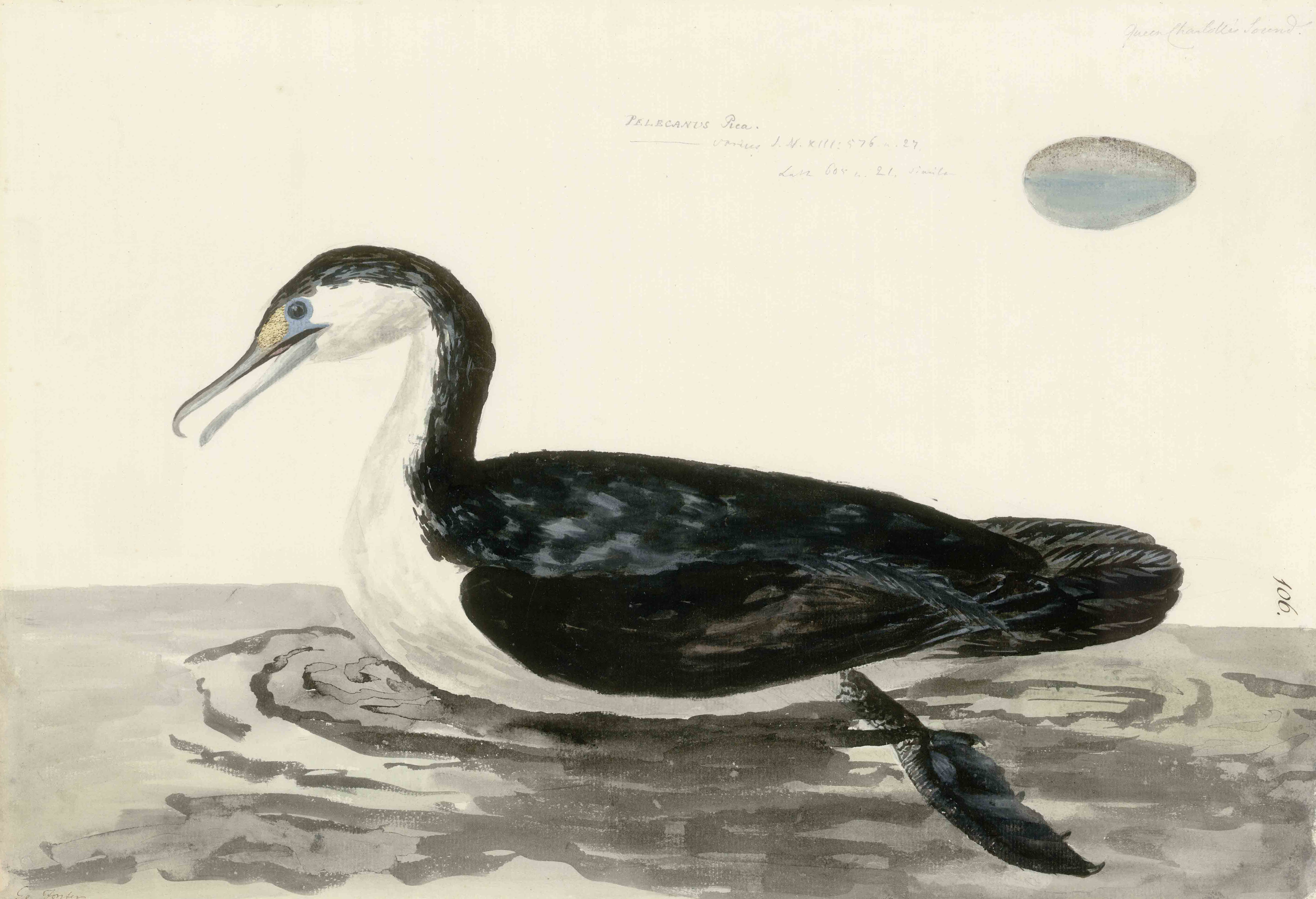
Watercolour by Georg Forster who accompanied James Cook on his second voyage

The pied cormorant is predominantly black on its back and upper surface of the wings and white on the underside with males weighing approximately 2.2 kg (4.9 lb) and females 1.7 kg (3.7 lb). It stands between 65 and 85 cm (26 and 33 in) tall, with a wingspan of 110–130 cm (43–51 in). A small yellow patch between the bill and the eye on each side of the head is likely to have been the reason for the historical common name. It has large webbed feet which it utilises to pursue fish underwater, steering with half opened wings. The bird has a large hooked bill, green eyes with a blue eye ring and black legs and feet. The eyes have a special nictitating membrane for underwater protection. The pied cormorant can often be seen spreading its wings after diving to help dry the feathers, as it has inadequate waterproofing. This lack of feather waterproofing may help the cormorant spend longer underwater due to decreased buoyancy effects.

The two subspecies have slight differences in physical characteristics. Similar species include the black-faced cormorant (slightly smaller) and the little pied cormorant (substantially smaller).

== Distribution and habitat ==
The pied cormorant is listed of least concern in the IUCN red list of threatened species, reflecting its large range with a relatively stable population.

In New Zealand its range on the east coast extends as far south as Christchurch, though this is a recent extension—older books report it no further south than Kaikōura. The range extensions have accompanied population recovery from heavy persecution in the early 1900s and likely represents recolonization of the former range. The pied cormorant is listed as Nationally Vulnerable in New Zealand. The population has been growing from around 700 breeding pairs in the 1950s to an estimated 3,000 pairs post 2000 (Refer to population trend data).

In Australia it is only moderately common in the eastern states (both the coast and inland wetlands), but abundant in the south-west, particularly along the coast. Its federal conservation status is 'secure' and only changes to 'near threatened' in Victoria. It can be found in all states except Tasmania. The pied cormorant has been calculated to be at high-moderate risk from fishing – particularly from set and inshore drift nets. Birds in colonies can often be observed entangled in recreational fishing line with hooks embedded in the body. In the past, the pied cormorant was seen as competition for commercial fishing and sometimes shot.

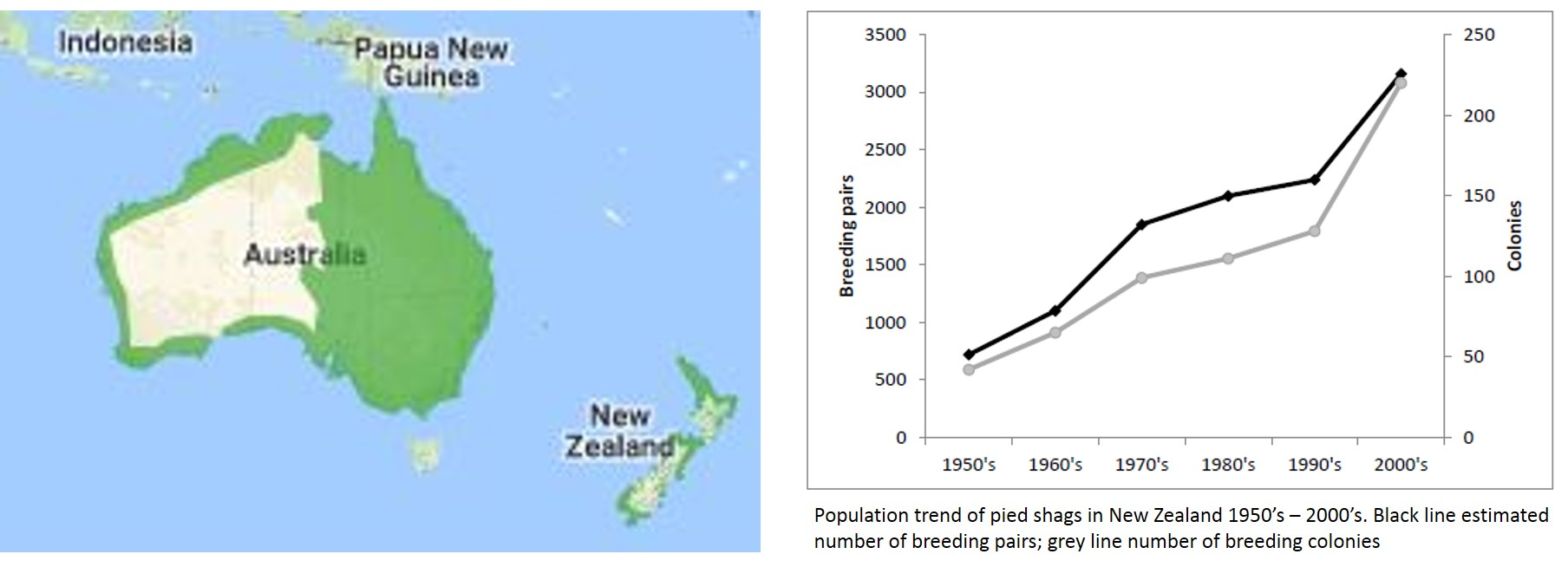
Distribution of pied cormorant in Australia and New Zealand and the population trends in New Zealand

Although typically found in marine habitat—sometimes solitary, sometimes in pairs, sometimes in vast flocks of hundreds or thousands—it is also attracted to inland waters, including lakes, deep and open wetlands, and rivers. In Australia, the birds can often be found at inland waterways while in New Zealand it prefers coastal areas close to its prey. Adult birds are sedentary and can often be seen roosting in trees, on rocks or logs in the water. The birds seem unaffected by variable salinity, turbidity and shoreline vegetation provided there are available perches.

== Behaviour and ecology ==
=== Feeding ===
The pied cormorant appears to feed largely (90%) on benthic fish 6–15 cm in length from waters less than 10m deep. King George Whiting juveniles are known to be eaten. Other dietary components (10%) are made up of crustaceans such as prawns and shrimp with some molluscs and cephalopods. It will dive both in shallow, still water and in rapidly moving currents. Typical dive times are around 40 seconds, with a recovery period of 10–15 seconds between dives although this is dependent on depth. The birds feed in deep and shallow waters (although shallow habitats are more productive) with flock densities in proportion to the prey abundance.

Hunting is typically performed as individuals (potentially to avoid kleptoparasitism), although larger groups can be observed when schools of small fish are close to the surface. Risk of predation by sharks and the abundance of food comprise a trade-off where the pied cormorant may choose to hunt in deeper waters where prey is less abundant if the risk is too high during warmer months when sharks are present more often. The deeper waters however require longer dive times and corresponding longer times at rest between dives on the surface.

=== Breeding ===
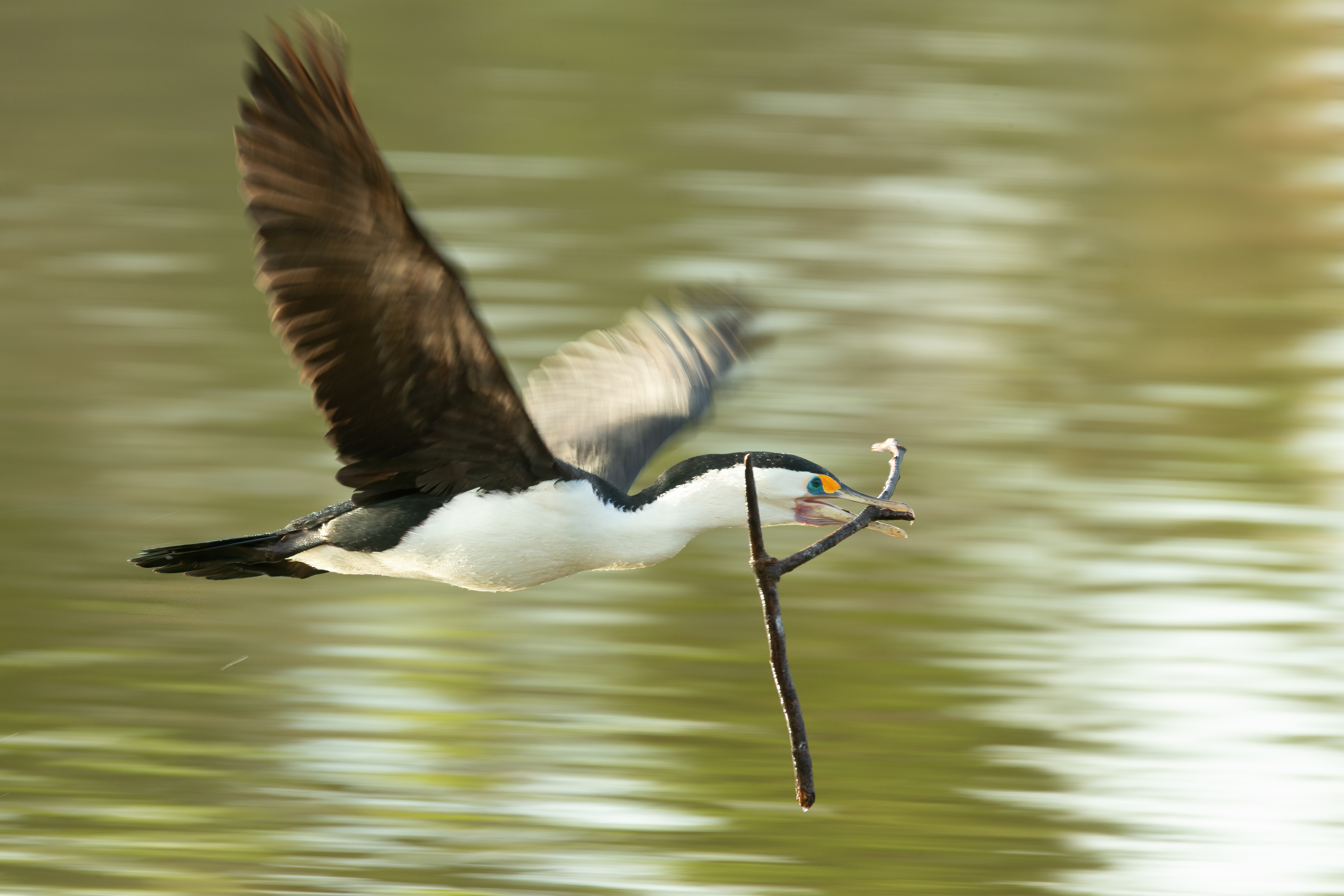
With nesting material

The pied cormorant preferably breeds in small (<30 pairs) sheltered colonies (harbours, estuaries and lakes) with rarer occurrences on exposed coasts or islands, no more than 400 m (1,300 ft) from the sea (or food source). Courtship behaviour is initiated by the male in close proximity to a future nest site. Wing waving by the male is conducted in silence while gargling can be a form of female recognition. The males can also hop up to 1 m in the air with both feet to attract female attention.

Nests are typically large platforms formed of sticks and foliage cemented with droppings averaging 80 cm (31 in) in diameter on the ground or in trees. Males collect most of the nest material, while both sexes share construction tasks. The nests are used twice a year in Autumn and Spring by different breeding pairs. Some breeding occurs in summer and winter by young and inexperienced pairs.

Monogamous breeding pairs (from 2 years of age) lay eggs once a year with an average breeding cycle of 6 months. Clutch size ranges from 2–5 with an incubation period of 25–33 days. Egg and fledgling caring duties are shared by the parents. Chick rearing can take from 47 to 60 days with independence gained just over 3 months of age. Both sexes share feeding duties through incomplete regurgitation.

=== Dispersal ===
Banding studies have shown that the pied cormorants do not travel far from their colonies, less than 20 km (12 mi). Flight is generally low in altitude, as the pied cormorant has weaker flight capability than other species in the family, with 'v' formations present when in flocks.

== Noongar culture ==
The Noongar Aboriginal people who live in the south-west corner of Western Australia believe that the pied cormorant (medi) is responsible for the transport of souls of the deceased across and beneath the Western sea to their final resting place (Kurannup). Medi can be translated as 'agent', or 'medium', possibly referring to the bird's role as an intermediary between the living world and the afterlife. Spirits of the deceased rest for an unspecified time on the moojar (WA Christmas tree) before being carried by easterly winds or flowing waters to the sea where the spirit joins with the medi for its journey to Kurranup.

== Gallery ==
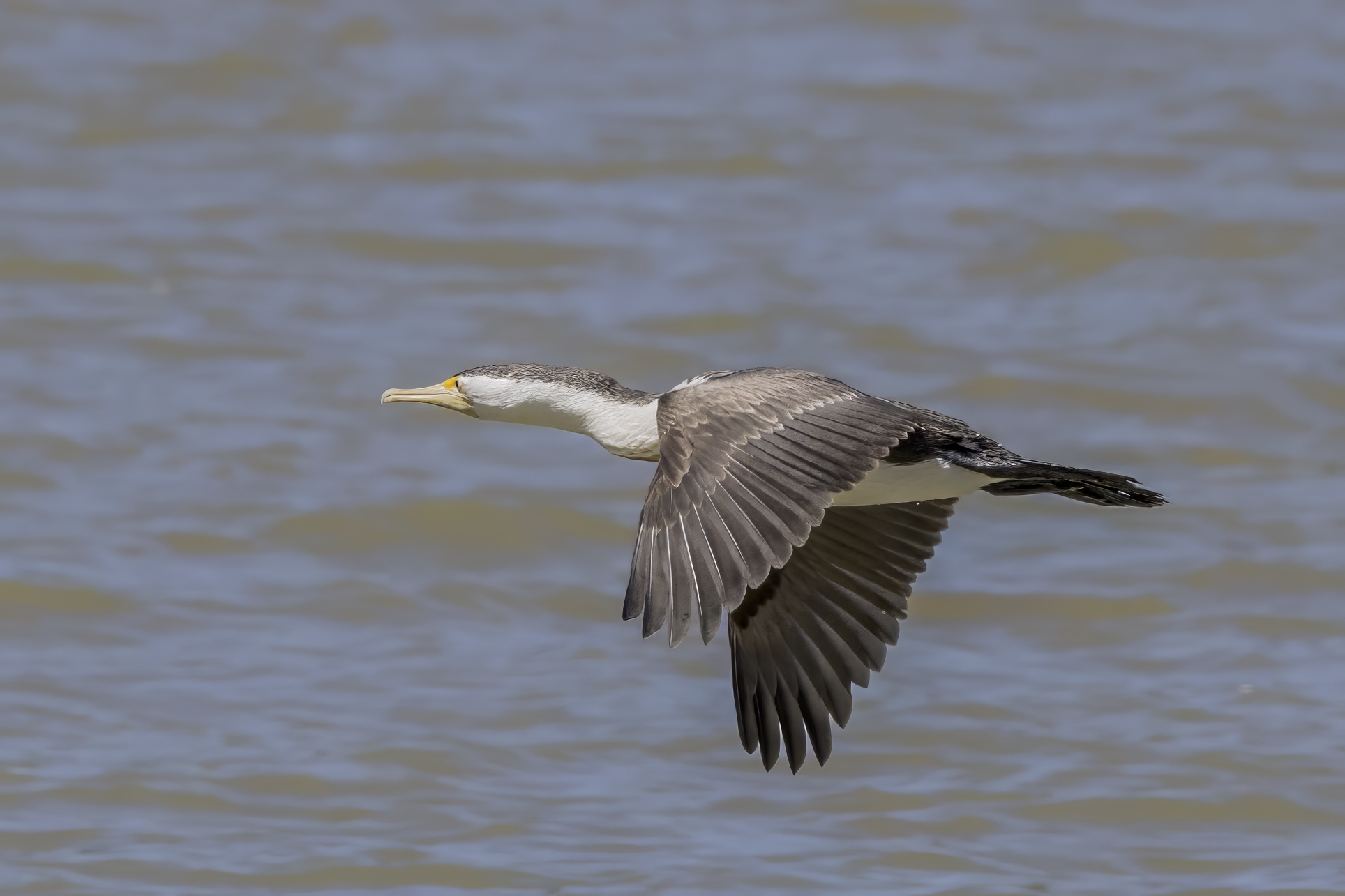
Murray River, South Australia

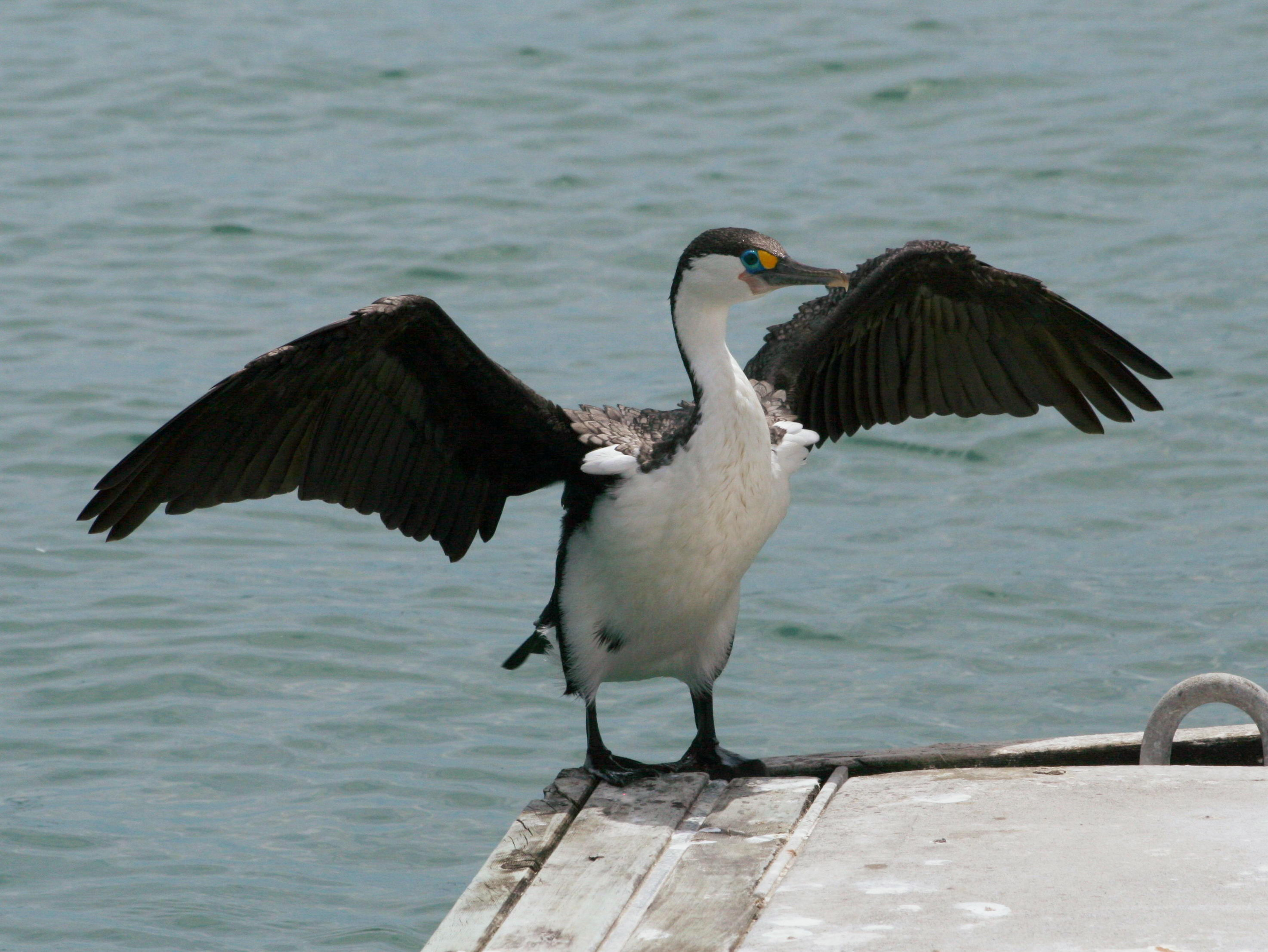
Auckland, New Zealand

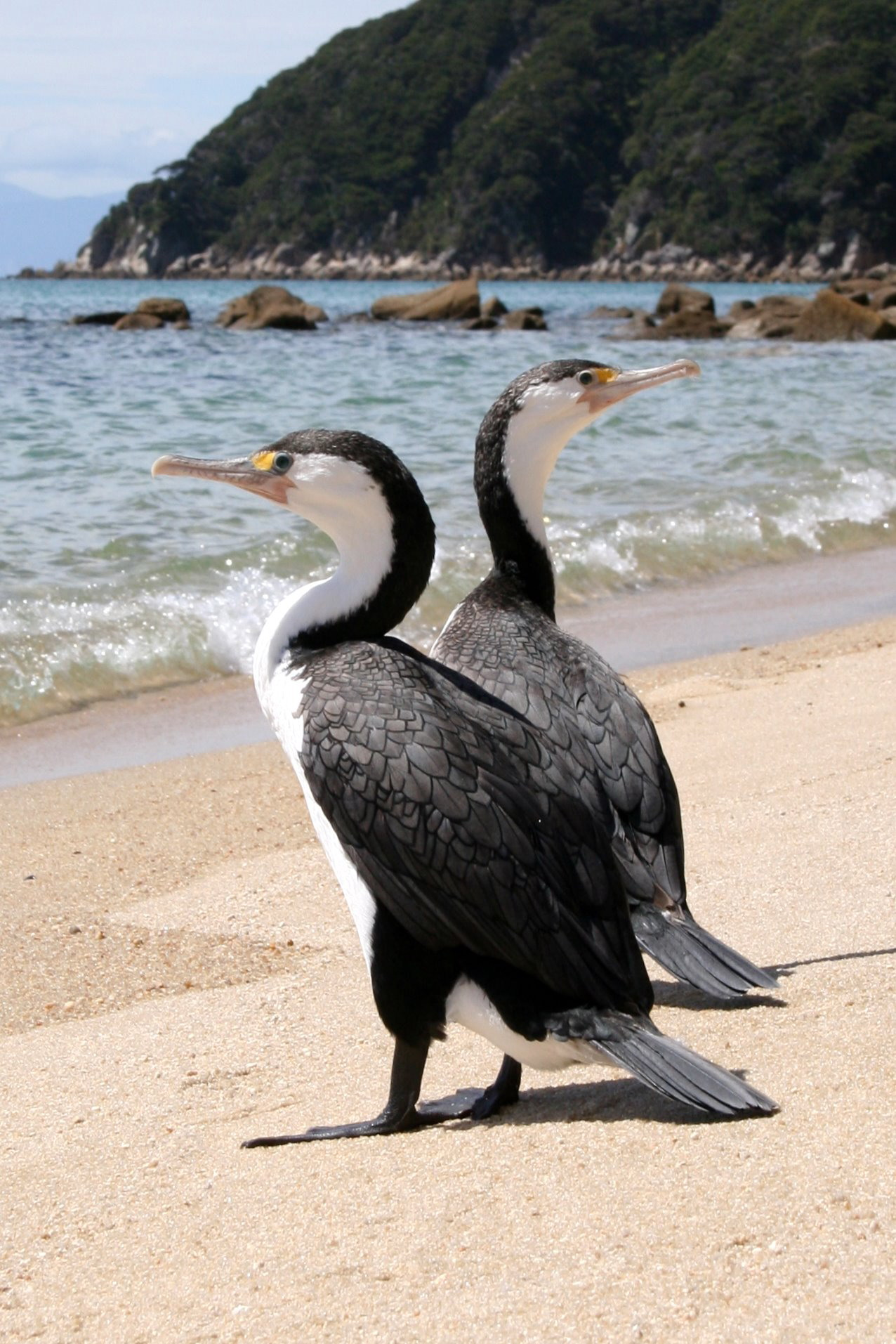
Pair in Abel Tasman National Park, New Zealand

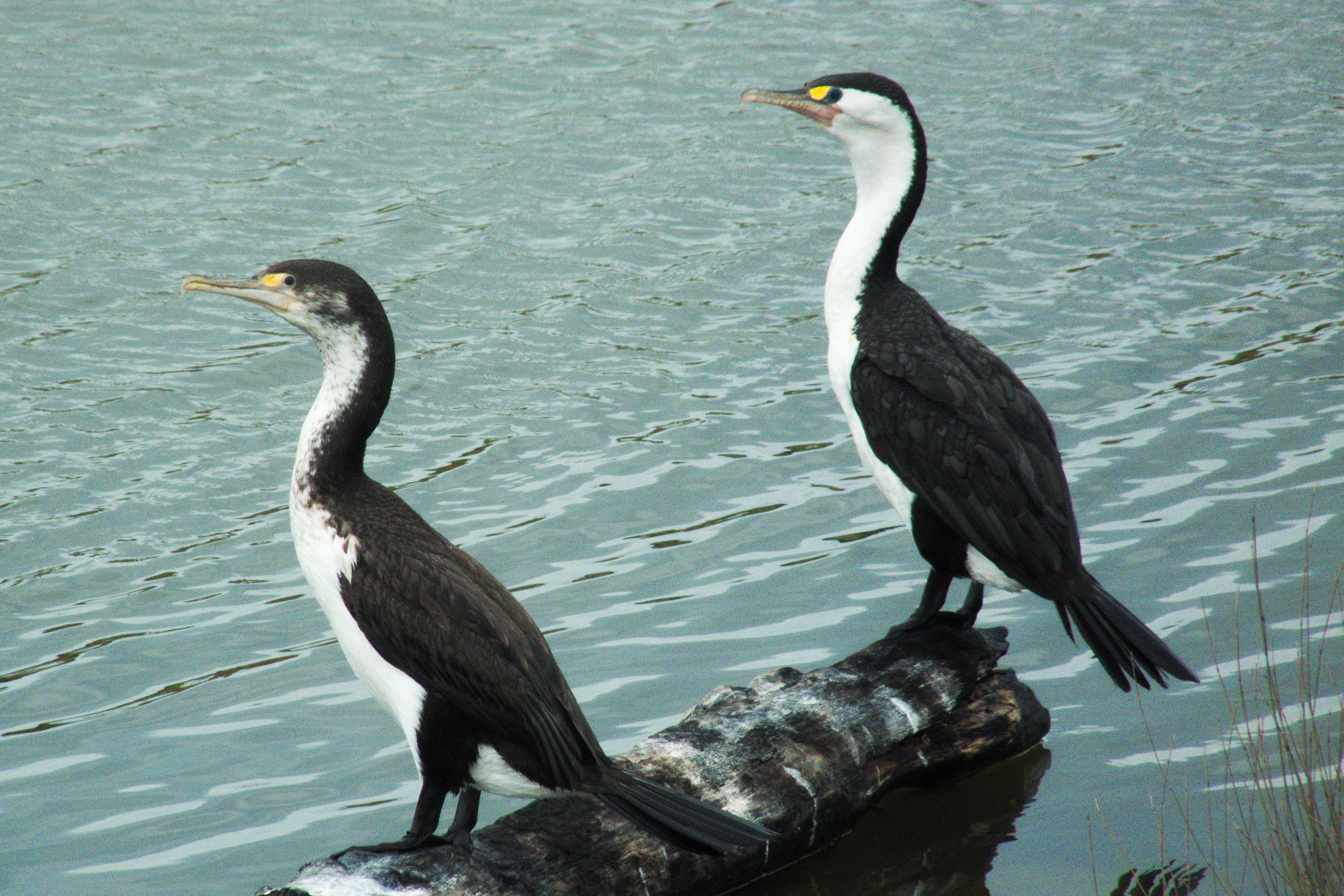
Immature and adult, New Zealand

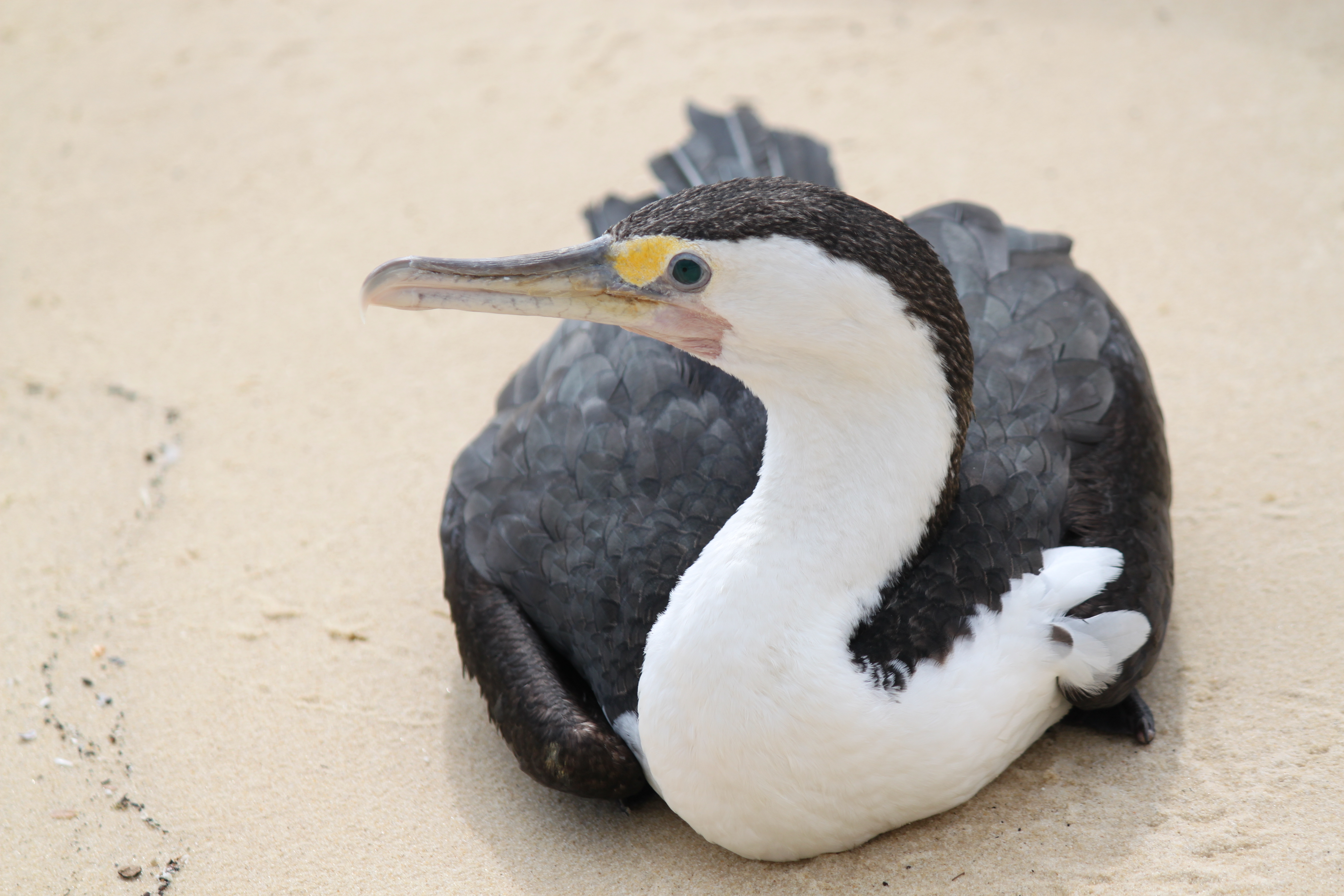
Pied cormorant resting on sand

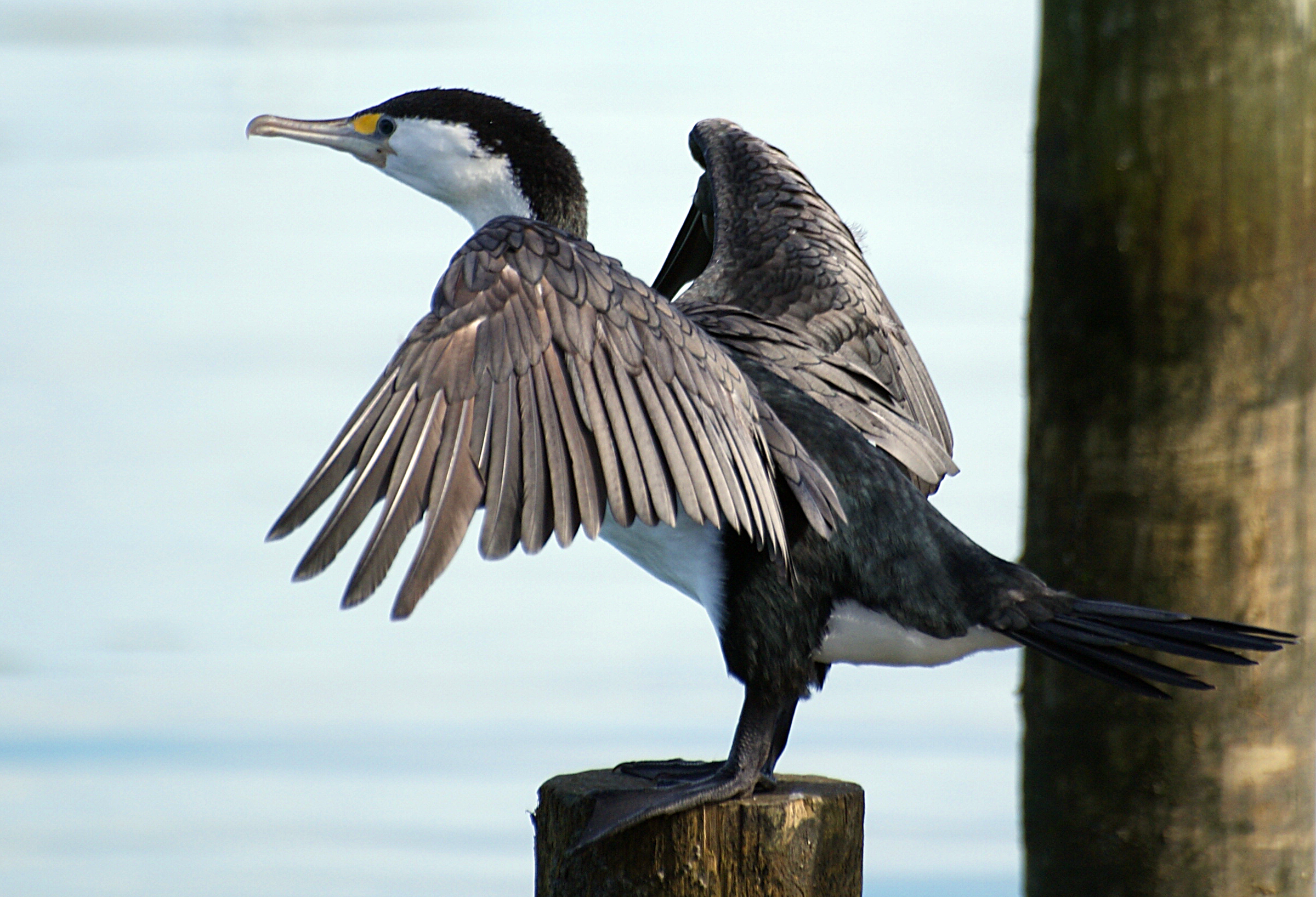
Pied shag drying wings

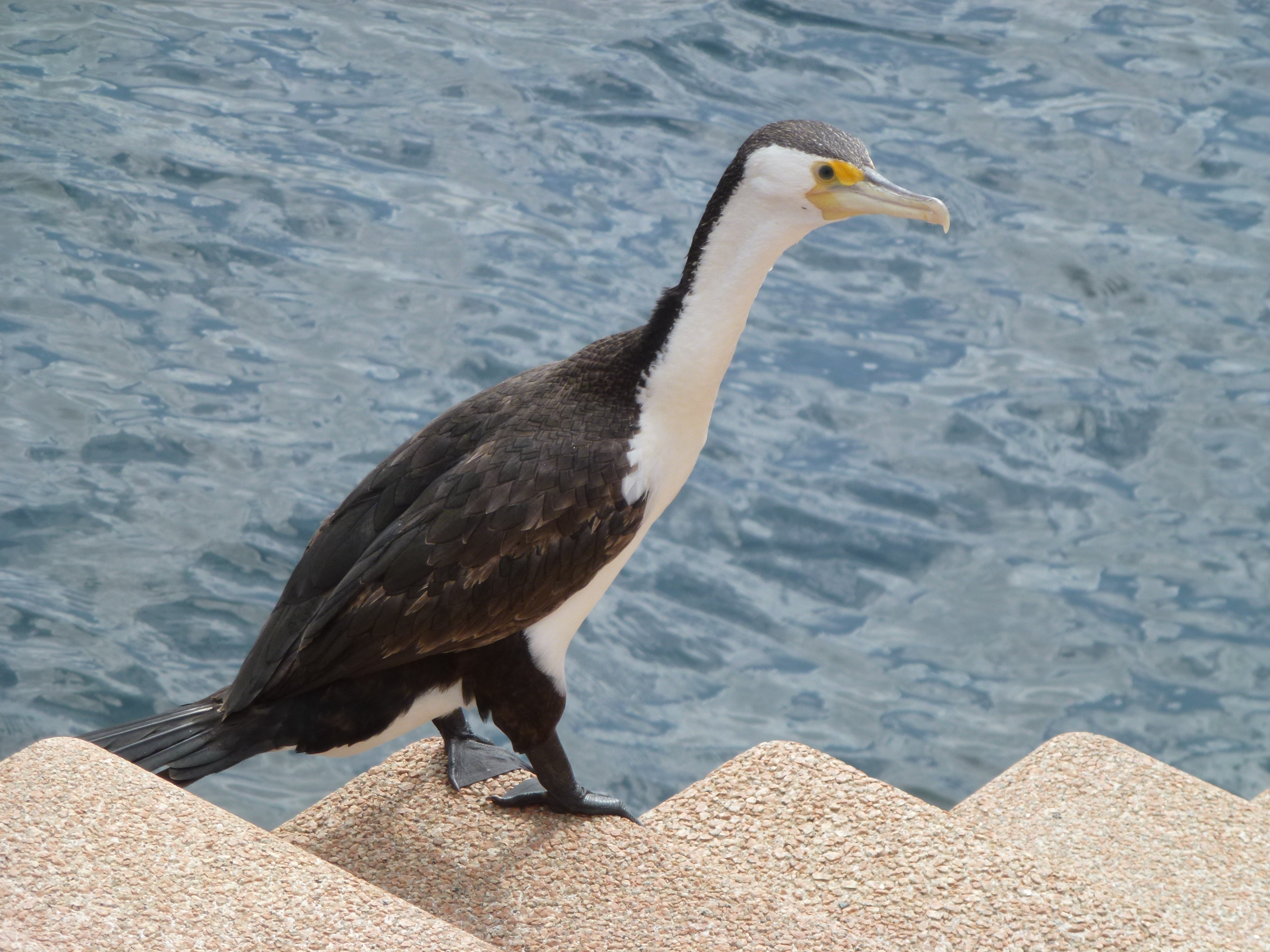
Pied cormorant in an urban setting – the Sydney Opera House

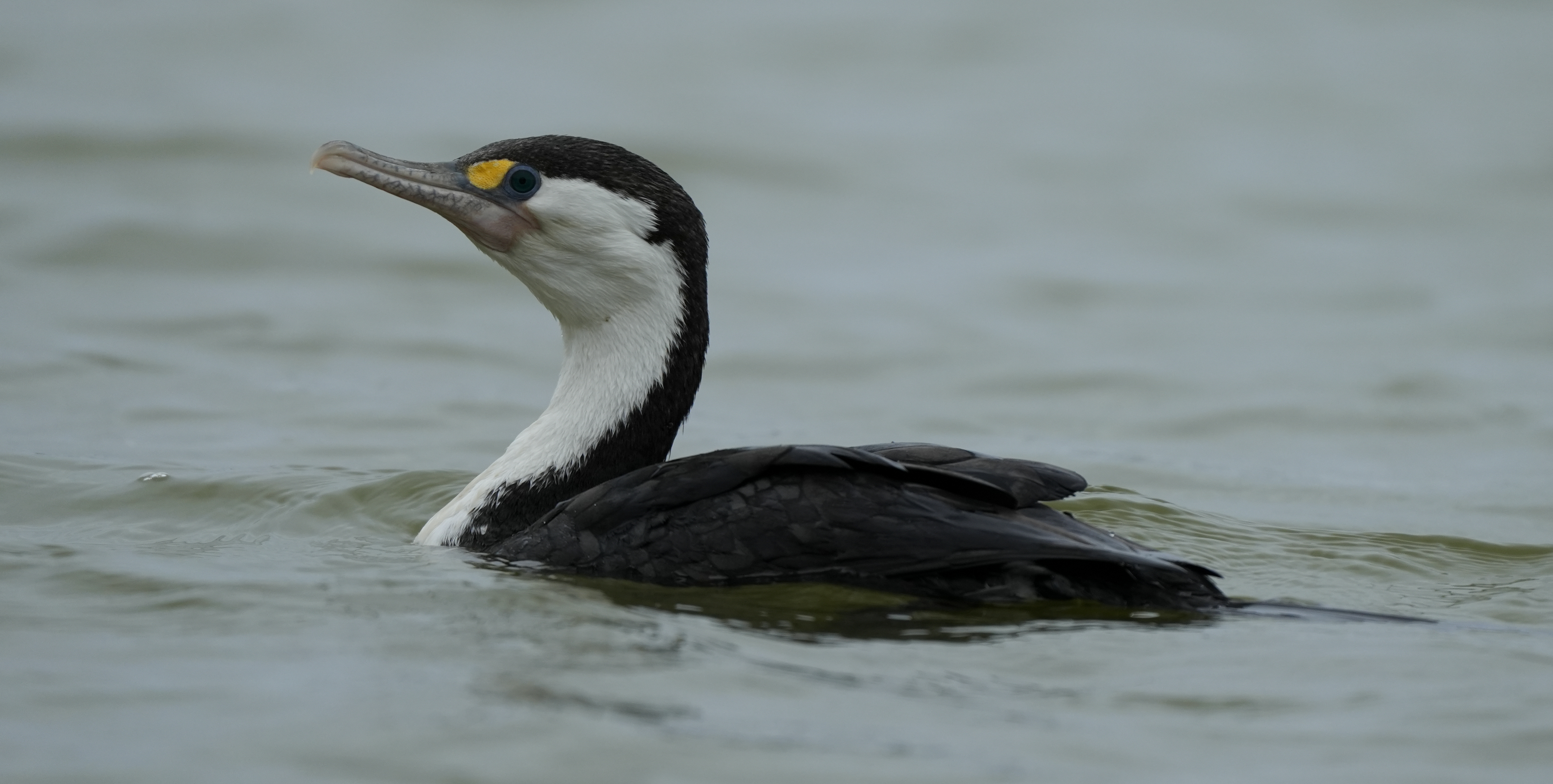
On water at Fishermans Point, Lake Ellesmere.

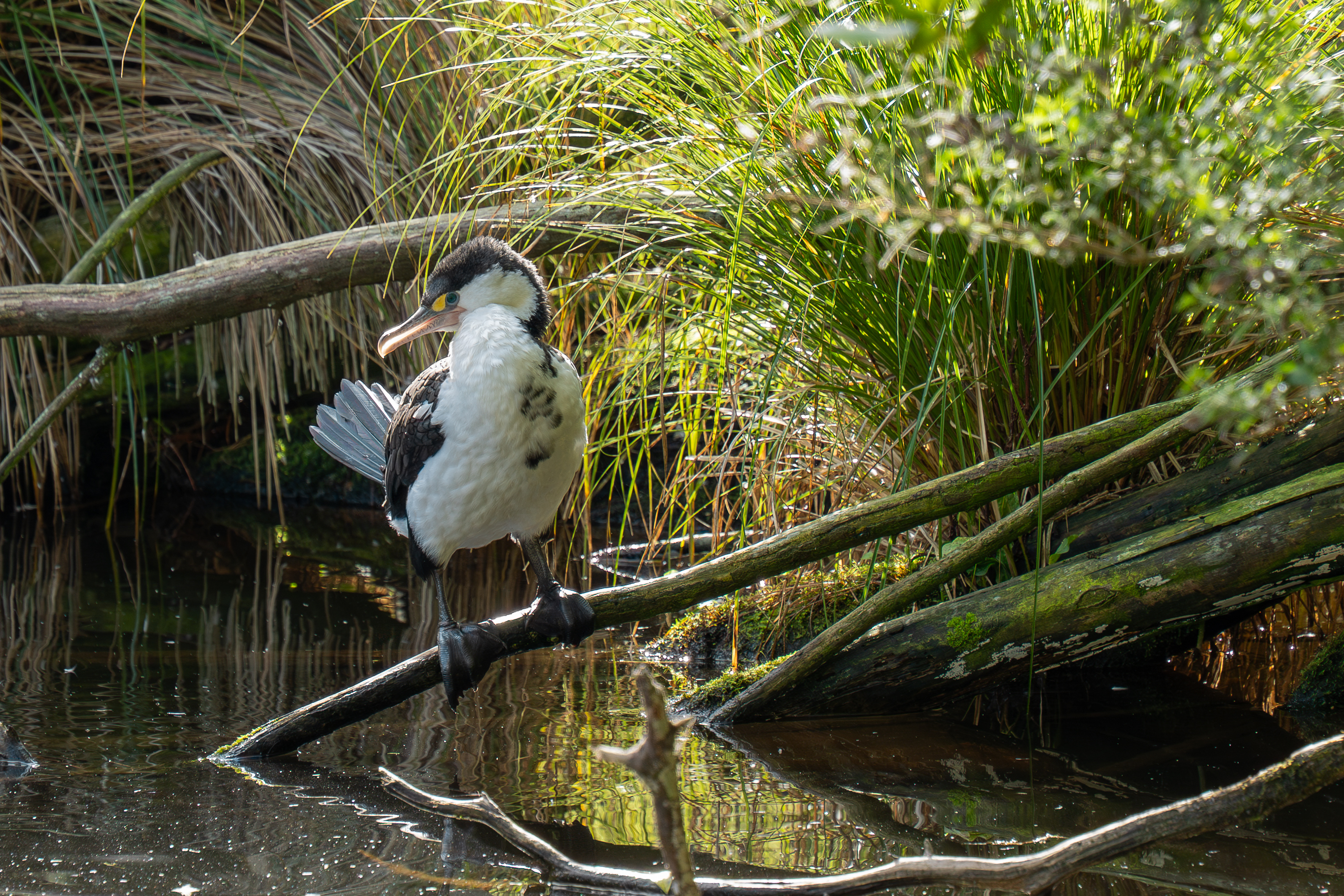
At Zealandia Wildlife Sanctuary, New Zealand
