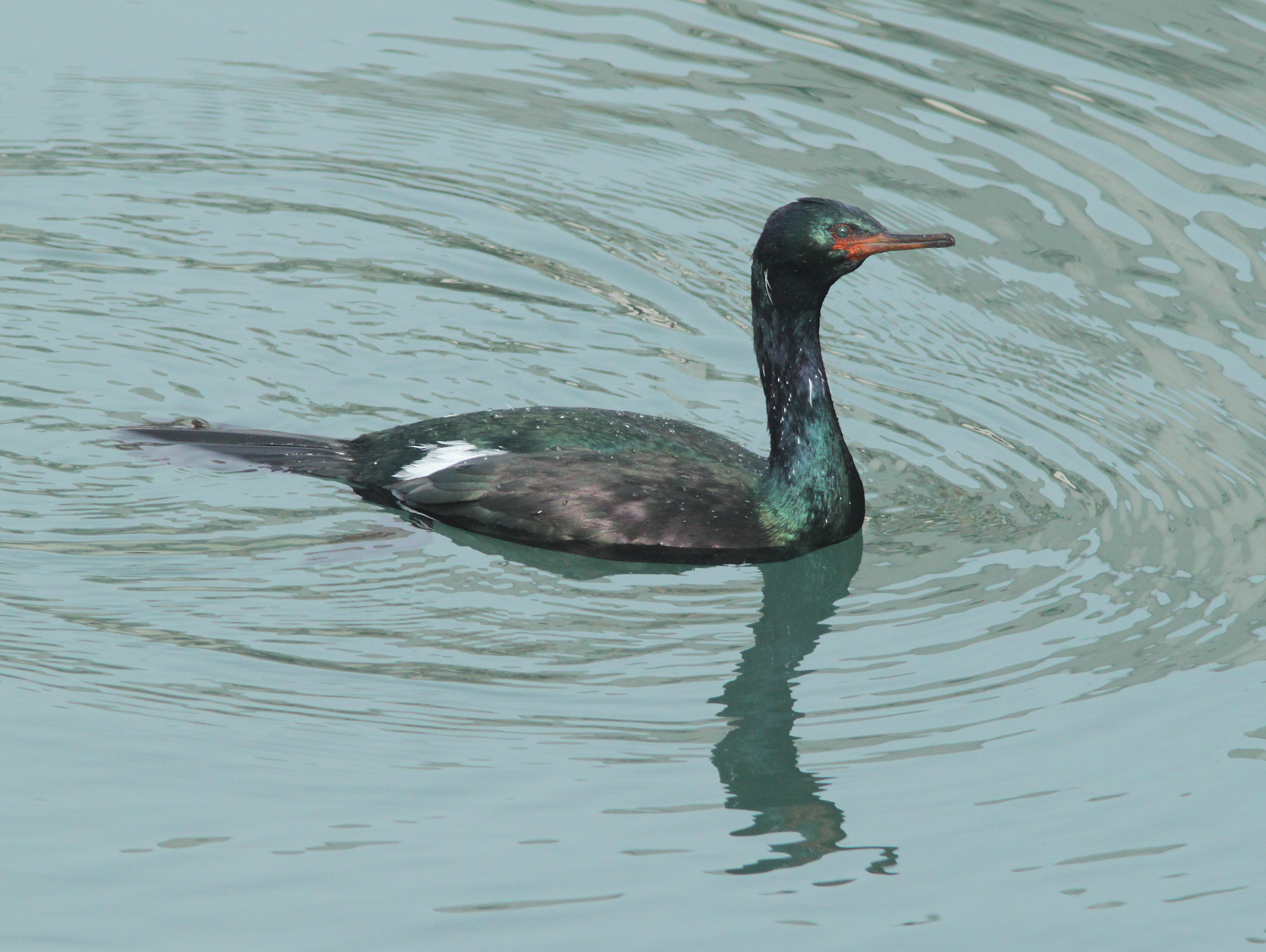
- Pelagic cormorant, U. pelagicus

Scientific classification
- Kingdom: Animalia
- Phylum: Chordata
- Class: Aves
- Order: Suliformes
- Family: Phalacrocoracidae
- Genus: Urile; Bonaparte, 1856

Type species
- Urile urile Gmelin, JF, 1789

Species
- Urile penicillatus Urile urile Urile pelagicus †Urile perspicillatus

= Urile =

Genus of birds

Urile is a genus of birds in the family Phalacrocoracidae, commonly known as North Pacific cormorants. It contains 3 extant and 1 recently extinct species, all of which are or were found in the North Pacific Ocean.

Members of this genus were formerly classified within the genus Phalacrocorax. Based on the results of a molecular phylogenetic study published in 2014, the genus Phalacrocorax was split and these species were moved to the resurrected genus Urile that had been introduced in 1856 by the French naturalist Charles Lucien Bonaparte with the red-faced cormorant as the type species. Urile is thought to have split from Phalacrocorax 8.9 - 10.3 million years ago. The genus contains four species, of which one is now extinct.

== List of species ==
Genus Urile – Bonaparte, 1856 – four species
| Common name | Scientific name and subspecies | Range | Size and ecology | IUCN status and estimated population |
|---|---|---|---|---|
| Brandt's cormorant | Urile penicillatus (Brandt, 1837) | Pacific Coast of North America; resident from southern British Columbia south to Baja California, nonbreeding range extends north to Gulf of Alaska and south to Sinaloa | Size: Habitat: Diet: | LC |
| Red-faced cormorant | Urile urile (Gremlin, JF, 1789) | coastlines of North Pacific Ocean of both Asia and North America, from Hokkaido east to the Gulf of Alaska | Size: Habitat: Diet: | LC |
| Pelagic cormorant | Urile pelagicus (Pallas, 1811) Two subspecies: U. p. pelagicus Pallas, 1811; U. p. resplendens Audubon, 1838 | coastlines of North Pacific Ocean of both Asia and North America, breeding range from eastern Russia east to western North America as far south as the Coronado Islands; wintering range extends as far south as Taiwan on the western end of range and central Baja California on the eastern end of range | Size: Habitat: Diet: | LC |
| Spectacled cormorant | †Urile perspicillatus (Pallas, 1811) | (formerly) Bering Island, Russia; potentially other islands in the Commander Islands, as well as the parts of the adjacent Kamchatka Peninsula. Now extinct. | Size: Habitat: Diet: | EX |
