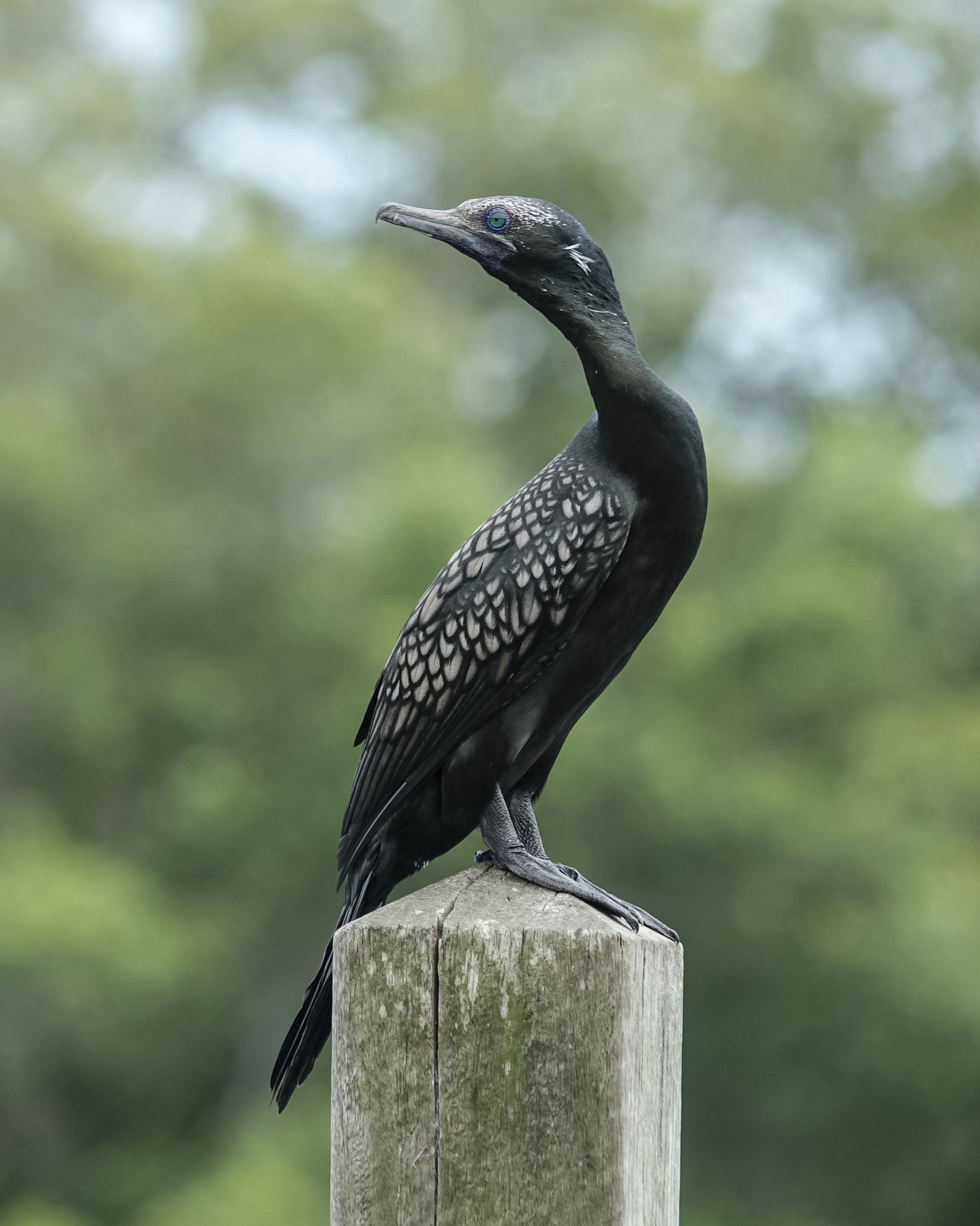

Conservation status
- Least Concern (IUCN 3.1)

Scientific classification
- Kingdom: Animalia
- Phylum: Chordata
- Class: Aves
- Order: Suliformes
- Family: Phalacrocoracidae
- Genus: Phalacrocorax
- Species: P. sulcirostris

Binomial name
- Phalacrocorax sulcirostris (Brandt, 1837)

Synonyms
- Stictocarbo sulcirostris; Nanocorax sulcirostris

= Little black cormorant =

Species of bird

The little black cormorant (Phalacrocorax sulcirostris) is a member of the cormorant family of seabirds. It is common in smaller rivers and lakes throughout most areas of Australia and northern New Zealand, where it is known as the little black shag. It is around sixty centimetres long, and is all black with blue-green eyes.

== Taxonomy ==
The little black cormorant was formally described in 1837 by the German born naturalist Johann Friedrich von Brandt. He placed it in the genus Carbo and coined the binomial name Carbo sulcirostris. The species is now placed in the genus Phalacrocorax that was introduced by the French zoologist Mathurin Jacques Brisson in 1760. The genus name Phalacrocorax is the Latin word for a cormorant. The specific epithet sulcirostris combines the Latin sulcus meaning "furrow" with -rostris meaning "-billed". The species is monotypic: no subspecies are recognised.

A molecular phylogenetic study published in 2019 found that the little black cormorant was sister to the Indian cormorant. It is estimated that the two species split 2.5–3.2 million years ago during the late Pliocene.

== Description ==
The little black cormorant is a small cormorant measuring 60–65 cm (23.5–25.5 in) with all black plumage. The back has a greenish sheen. In breeding season, white feathers appear irregularly about the head and neck, with a whitish eyebrow evident. The plumage is a more fade brown afterwards. Males and females are identical in plumage. The long slender bill is grey, and legs and feet black. The iris of the adult is green and the juvenile brown. Immature birds have brown and black plumage.

== Distribution and habitat ==
The little black cormorant ranges from the Malay Peninsula through Indonesia (but excluding Sumatra) and New Guinea (including the D'Entrecasteaux Islands) and throughout Australia. It is found in New Zealand's North Island. It is a predominantly freshwater species, found in bodies of water inland and occasionally sheltered coastal areas. It is almost always encountered in or near water.

== Behaviour ==
More gregarious than other cormorants, the little black cormorant can be found in large flocks. Groups sometimes fly in V formations.

=== Food and feeding ===
The little black cormorant feeds mainly on fish, and eats a higher proportion of fish than the frequently co-occurring little pied cormorant, which eats more decapods. A field study at two storage lakes, Lake Cargelligo and Lake Brewster, in south-western New South Wales found that the introduced common carp made up over half of its food intake.

Little black cormorants have been observed on the Wyong River, Central Coast, NSW, Australia. They feed in a pattern as a flock. Traveling in the same direction they take off from the water, flapping their wings against the water moving in the same direction for a few metres then land on the water and wait for others to land in front of them while they dive below the water to catch the scrambling fish groups. They are observed coming to the surface swallowing fish and then moving forward again. A group of cormorants can be in the hundreds and stay in a tight formation of 10 to 20 metres while moving forward.

=== Breeding ===
Breeding occurs once a year in spring or autumn in southern Australia, and before or after the monsoon in tropical regions. The nest is a small platform built of dried branches and sticks in the forks of trees that are standing in water. Nests are often located near other waterbirds such as other cormorants, herons, ibis, or spoonbills. Three to five (rarely six or seven) pale blue oval eggs measuring 48 x 32 mm are laid. The eggs are covered with a thin layer of lime, giving them a matte white coated appearance. They become increasingly stained with faeces, as does the nest, over the duration of the breeding season.

== Various views and plumages ==
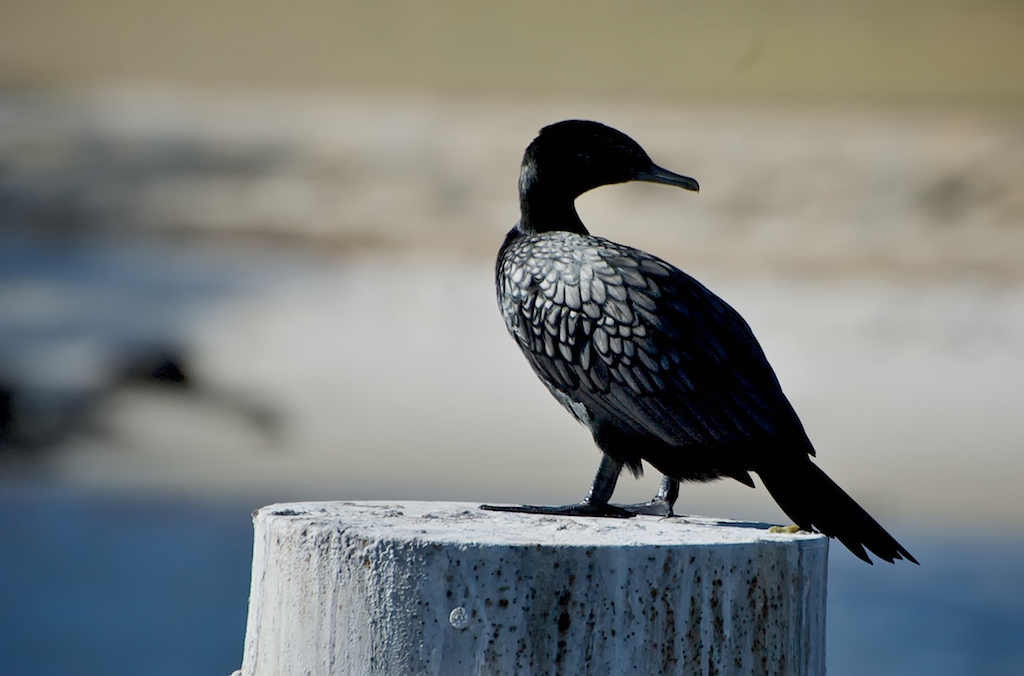
Adult in East Perth

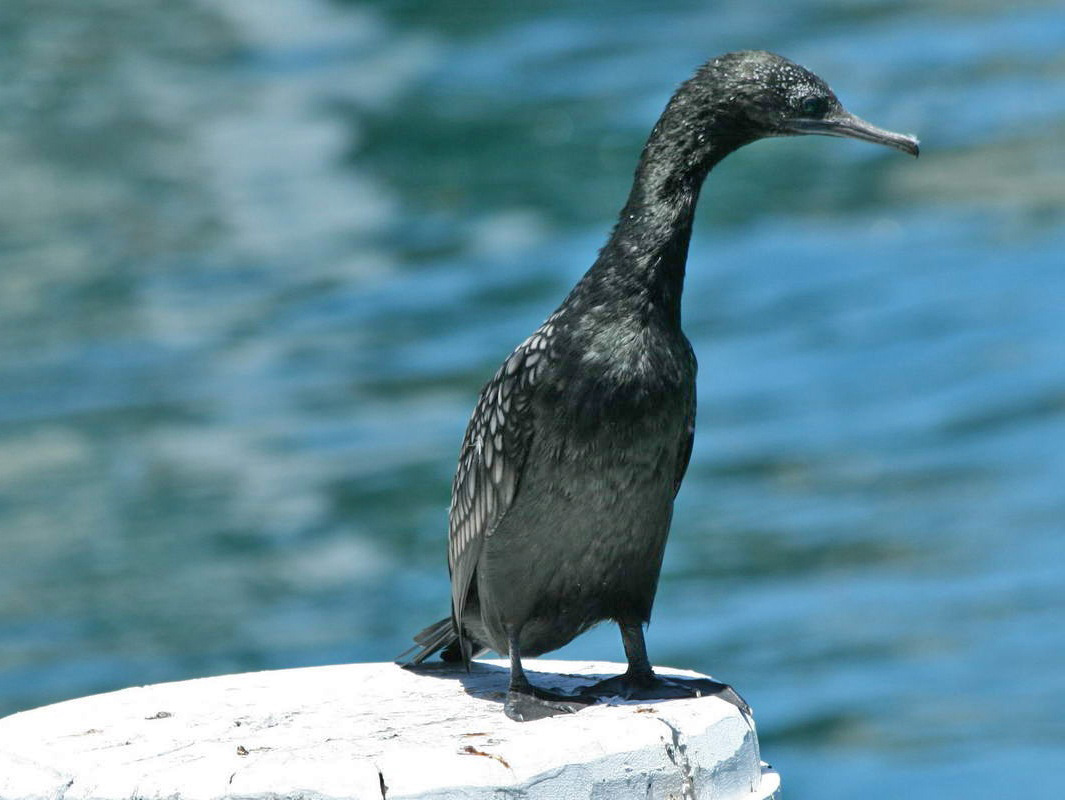
Manly (near Sydney)

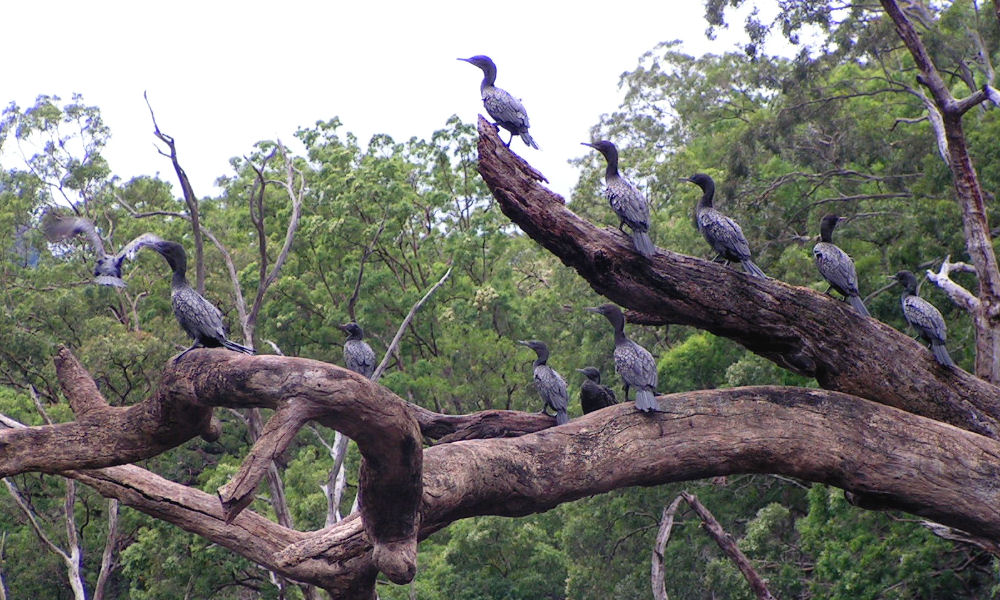
Shoalhaven River

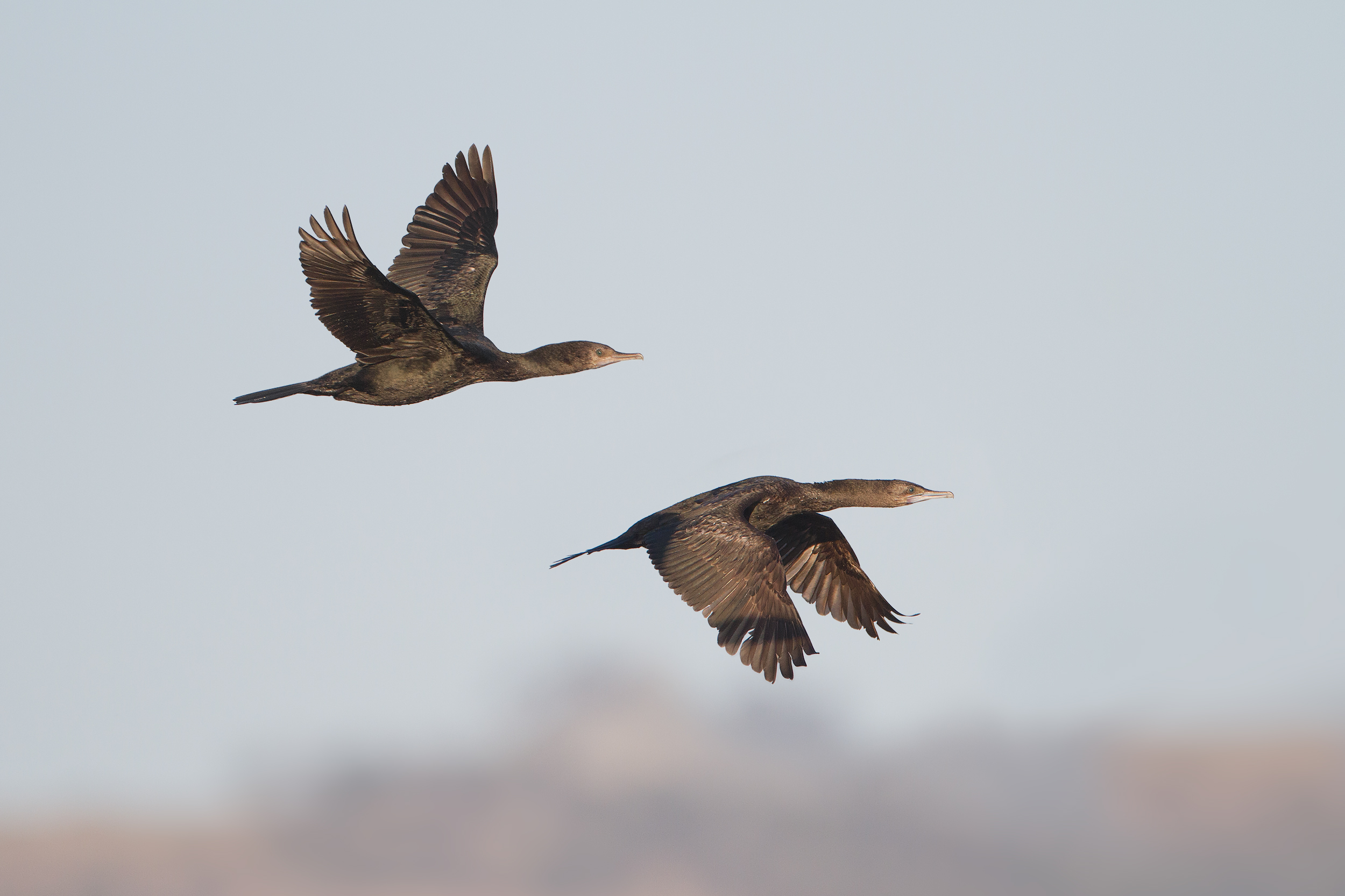
Pair in flight
