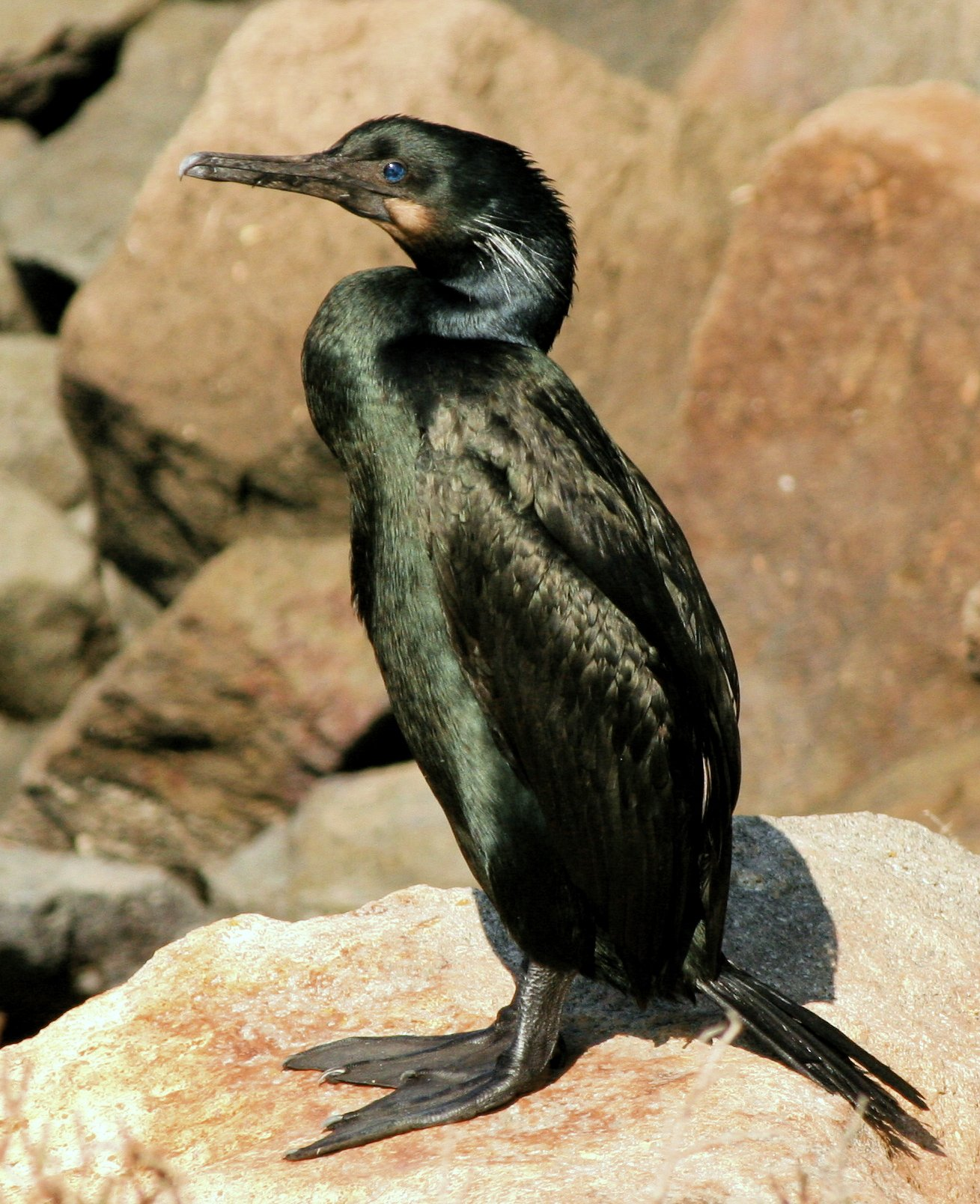

Conservation status
- Least Concern (IUCN 3.1)

Scientific classification
- Kingdom: Animalia
- Phylum: Chordata
- Class: Aves
- Order: Suliformes
- Family: Phalacrocoracidae
- Genus: Urile
- Species: U. penicillatus

Binomial name
- Urile penicillatus (Brandt, 1837)

Synonyms
- Phalacrocorax penicillatus

= Brandt's cormorant =

Species of bird

Brandt's cormorant (Urile penicillatus) is a strictly marine bird of the cormorant family of seabirds that inhabits the Pacific coast of North America. It ranges, in the summer, from Alaska to the Gulf of California, but the population north of Vancouver Island migrates south during the winter. Its specific name, penicillatus is Latin for a painter's brush (pencil of hairs), in reference to white plumes on its neck and back during the early breeding season. The common name honors the German naturalist Johann Friedrich von Brandt of the Academy of Sciences at St. Petersburg, who described the species from specimens collected on expeditions to the Pacific during the early 19th century.

== Taxonomy ==
It was formerly classified in the genus Phalacrocorax, but a 2014 study supported reclassifying it and several other Pacific cormorant species into the genus Urile. The IOU followed this classification in 2021.

== Description ==
The average size of a Brandt's cormorant is 4.6 lb (2.1 kg). It is about 34 in (86 cm) long and its wingspan is 4 ft (1.2 m). During the breeding season, adults have a blue throat patch.

== Distribution and habitat ==
Brandt's cormorants live on the Pacific coast of North America, in habitats such as bays, estuaries, and lagoons. This species nests on the ground or on rocky outcroppings. Año Nuevo Island is an important seabird breeding colony in the Monterey Bay National Marine Sanctuary, hosting Brandt's cormorants among other species of seabirds.

During the breeding season their range settles from Vancouver Island to the Baja California peninsula, solely relying on the food fertility of the California Current. In the non-breeding season, as the current diminishes, their range extends southwards, but also northwards to southern Alaska.

== Behavior ==
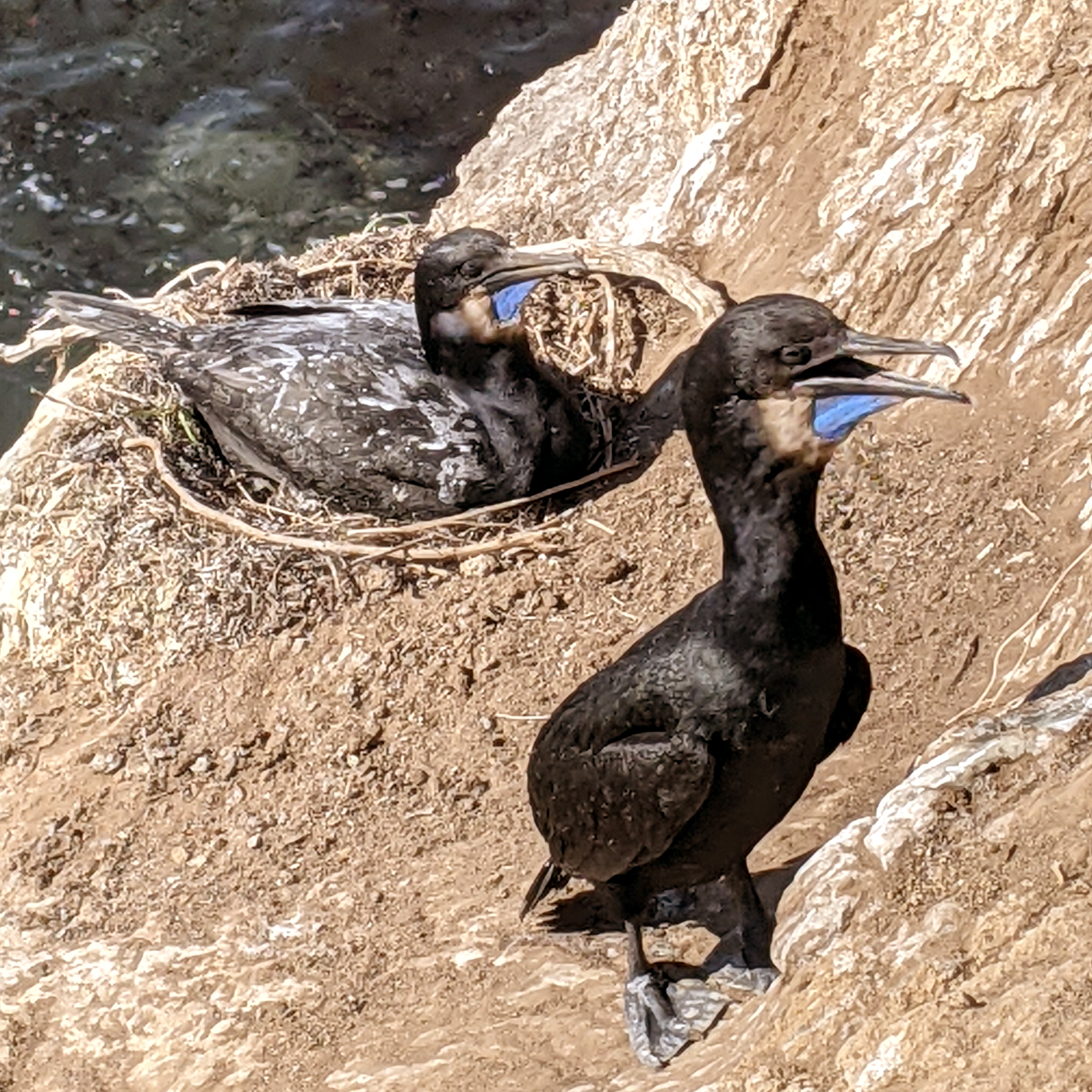
Two adults tend a nest. Both show blue throat patches characteristic of breeding plumage

They typically live in groups. They breed between March and August, and usually have four eggs. Young birds are cared for by both parents.

== Diet ==
Brandt's cormorants mostly eat fish such as herring and rockfish, but their diet can include other fish as well as shrimp and crabs. To hunt, they dive beneath the surface of the ocean to catch fish. They can dive over 200 feet deep. They can hunt either in groups or alone.

Brandt's cormorants feed either singly or in flocks, and are adaptable in prey choice and undersea habitat. It feeds on small fish from the surface to sea floor, obtaining them, like all cormorants, by pursuit diving using its feet for propulsion. Prey is often what is most common: in central California, rockfish from the genus Sebastes is the most commonly taken, but off British Columbia, it is Pacific herring. Brandt's cormorants have been observed foraging at depths of over 36.5 m (120 ft).
