= Pelagic goby =

Conservation status
- Least Concern (IUCN 3.1)

Scientific classification
- Kingdom: Animalia
- Phylum: Chordata
- Class: Actinopterygii
- Order: Gobiiformes
- Family: Gobiidae
- Genus: Sufflogobius; J. L. B. Smith, 1956
- Species: S. bibarbatus

Binomial name
- Sufflogobius bibarbatus (von Bonde, 1923)

Synonyms
- Gobius bibarbatus von Bonde, 1923; Nematogobius bibarbatus (von Bonde, 1923)

Species of fish

The pelagic goby (Sufflogobius bibarbatus), also known as the bearded goby, is a species of true goby from the family Gobiidae, native to the southeastern Atlantic Ocean. It is currently the only known member of its genus.

== Description ==
It reaches a maximum length of 17 centimeters (6.7 in). It has 7 dorsal spines and 12–13 dorsal soft rays. It has a single anal spine and 12–13 anal soft rays. Its fins are dusky to black in color.

== Range and habitat ==
This goby is demersal, inhabiting depths of 0–340 metres (0–1,115 ft) in subtropical waters ranging from 11–15 °C (52–59 °F) in the coastal waters of Namibia and South Africa.

The bearded goby is usually found offshore but was also recorded in shore pools. Juveniles are epipelagic, while adults migrate to deeper waters, and large adults are only recorded from demersal trawls.

The gobies can stay on the ocean floor for at least 10 to 12 hours at a time in an area of de-oxygenated "toxic sludge" rich in hydrogen sulfide H_{2}S where hardly anything lives except bacteria and nematodes. When settled on the bottom, they remain alert, showing rapid escape responses. They use the toxic mud as a refuge. Their population is growing despite the fact that they are now the main prey species in this unusual ecosystem.

== Feeding ==
In 2010 was observed to feed on a species of jellyfish which was understood to be its main predator. Jellies provide up to 1/3 of the fish's diet. It hides from mackerel amongst the jellies' stinger-covered tentacles when it rises from the seafloor for nighttime feeding.

== Predation ==
Fishes, penguins, Cape cormorants, crested terns and fur seals and jellies eat this fish.

This goby hides from predators within jelly tentacles when it rises to feed and reoxygenate its blood.

Although targeted by purse seines, it may also be caught incidentally in trawls.
