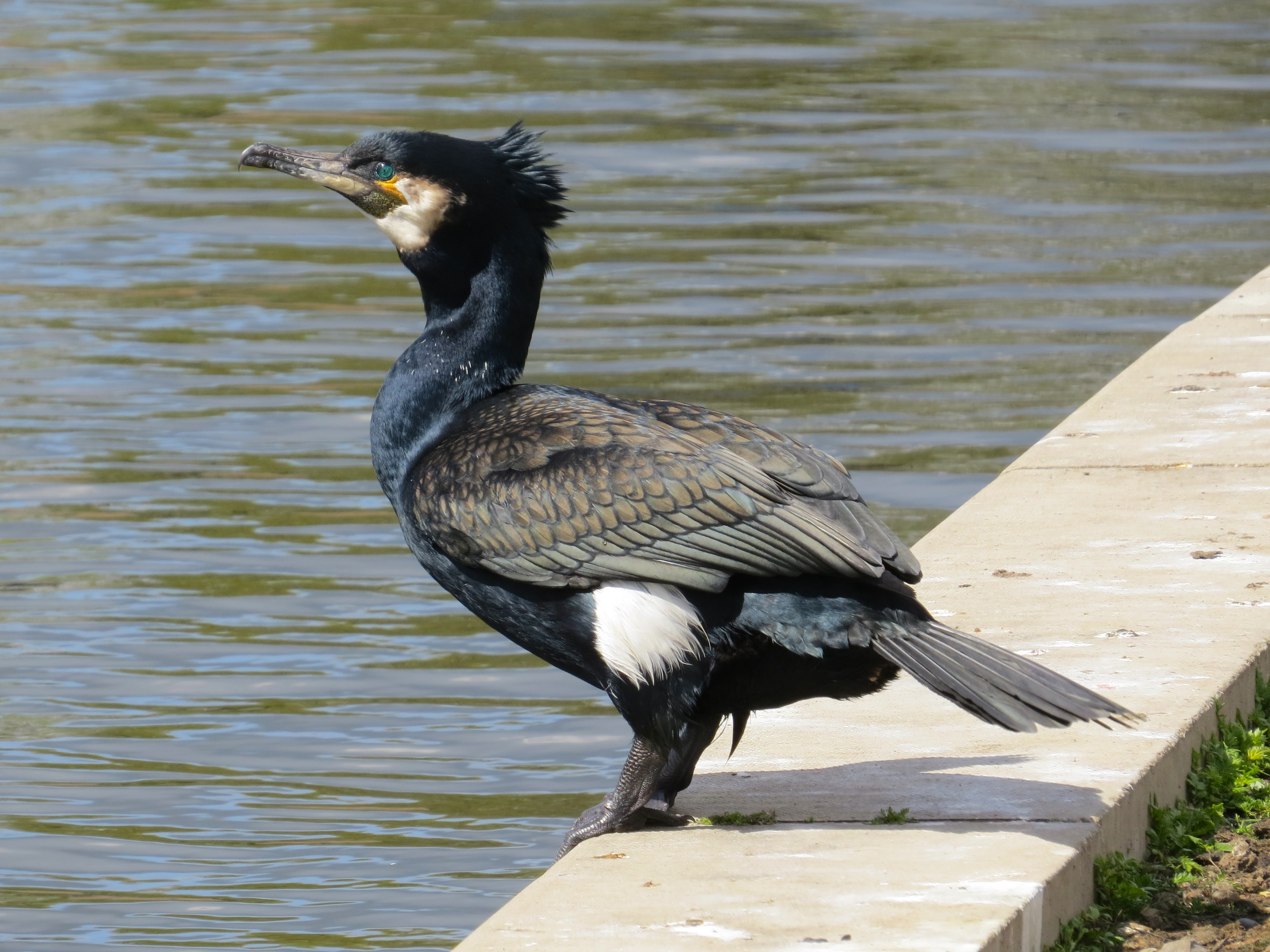
- Great cormorant (Phalacrocorax carbo)

Scientific classification
- Kingdom: Animalia
- Phylum: Chordata
- Class: Aves
- Order: Suliformes
- Family: Phalacrocoracidae
- Genus: Phalacrocorax; Brisson, 1760

Type species
- Pelecanus carbo Linnaeus, 1758

Species
- 12, see text

Synonyms
- Stictocarbo; Nanocorax (partim); Anocarbo

= Phalacrocorax =

Genus of birds

Phalacrocorax is a genus of fish-eating birds in the cormorant family Phalacrocoracidae. Members of this genus are sometimes informally known as the Old World cormorants, though their distribution is not confined to the Old World, nor are they the only cormorants in the Old World.

== Description ==
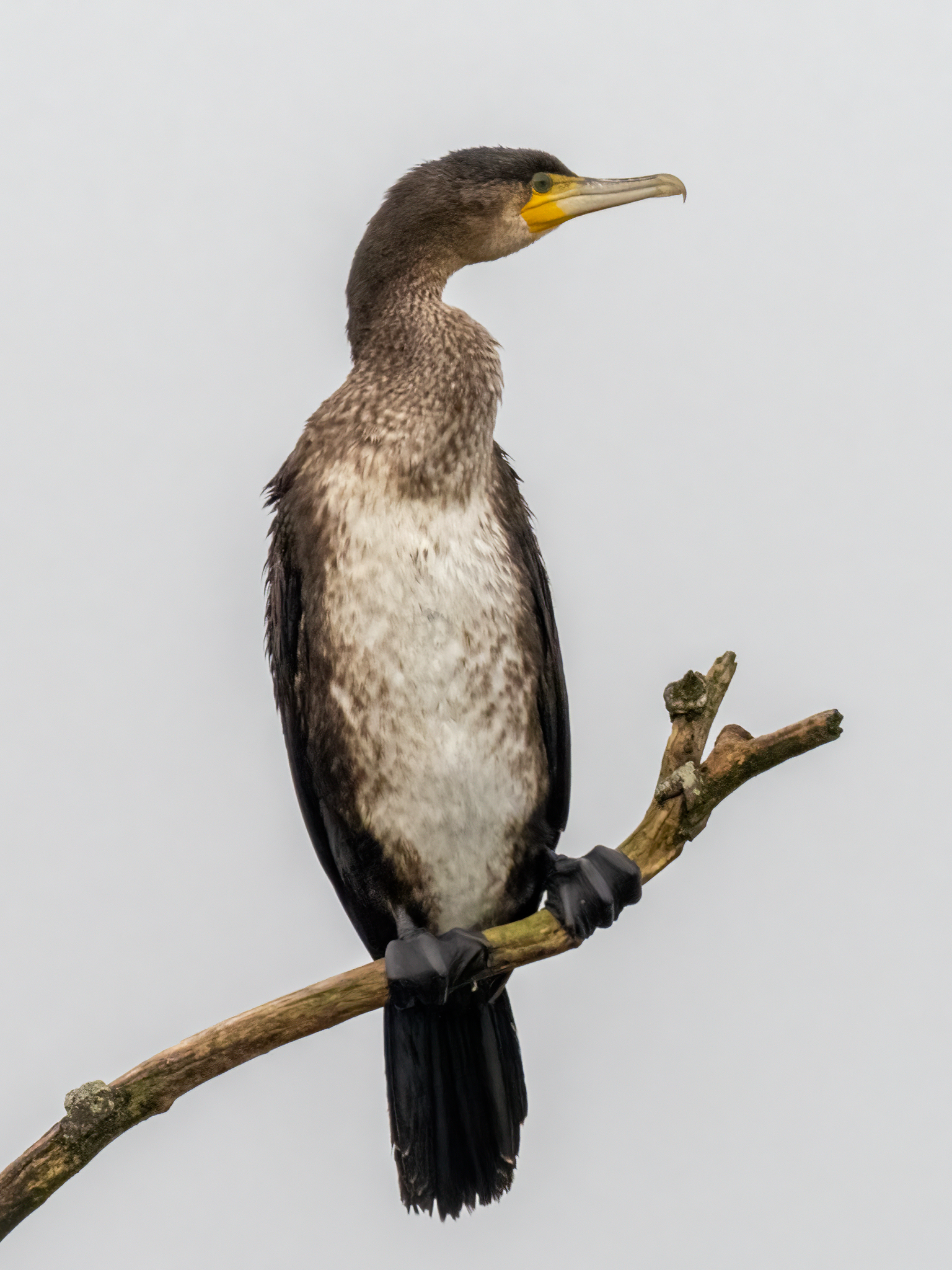
Juvenile Phalacrocorax carbo with extensive but diffuse white on the underparts. The other species show broadly similar juvenile plumage.

The species are medium-sized to large for cormorants, ranging from 55–100 centimetres (22–39 in) long and with wingspans from 95–160 centimetres (37–63 in), and from 0.52–3.6 kilograms (1.1–7.9 lb) weight; the smallest is little black cormorant P. sulcirostris, and the largest great cormorant P. carbo. The plumage is black, or pied with varying amounts of white. The black feathers are frequently iridescent, often green- to bronze-glossed on the wings and purple-glossed on the body and head, particularly in the breeding season; often duller, and/or with less white, in the winter. The eyes are an intense blue-green in most species, but dark in some, and with a yellow eye ring in bank cormorant P. neglectus. The feet are, as in all cormorants, totipalmate, with webs extending between all four toes; they are large, and used for underwater propulsion when fishing. Juveniles are duller, often brownish above, and often with ill-defined pale or whitish underparts, lacking the sharp demarcation between black and white plumage that adults show. All are closely tied to water for feeding; some (particularly Socotra cormorant P. nigrogularis and bank cormorant P. neglectus) are exclusively marine, others use both marine and freshwater habitats.

== Taxonomy ==
The genus Phalacrocorax was introduced by the French zoologist Mathurin Jacques Brisson in 1760 with the great cormorant (Phalacrocorax carbo) as the type species. Phalacrocorax is the Latin word for a cormorant.

=== Current taxonomy ===
A molecular phylogenetic study published in 2014 found that the genus Phalacrocorax contains 12 species. This taxonomy was adopted by the IUCN Red List and BirdLife International, and later by the IOC.

Genus Phalacrocorax – Brisson, 1760 – twelve species
Common name	Scientific name and subspecies	Range	Size and ecology	IUCN status and estimated population
Bank cormorant or Wahlberg's cormorant	Phalacrocorax neglectus (Wahlberg, 1855)	Namibia and the western seaboard of South Africa	Size: Habitat: Diet:	EN
Socotra cormorant	Phalacrocorax nigrogularis Ogilvie-Grant & Forbes, HO, 1899	Arabian Peninsula.	Size: Habitat: Diet:	VU
Pitt shag or Featherstone's shag	Phalacrocorax featherstoni Buller, 1873	Pitt Island.	Size: Habitat: Diet:	EN
Spotted shag	Phalacrocorax punctatus (Sparrman, 1786) Two subspecies: P. p. punctatus; P. p. oliveri	New Zealand.	Size: Habitat: Diet:	LC
Black-faced cormorant	Phalacrocorax fuscescens (Vieillot, 1817)	Western Australia, South Australia, Victoria and Tasmania	Size: Habitat: Diet:	LC
Australian pied cormorant or yellow-faced cormorant	Phalacrocorax varius (Gmelin, 1789) Two subspecies: P. v. hypoleucos; P. v. varius	Australasia, New Zealand	Size: Habitat: Diet:	LC
Little black cormorant	Phalacrocorax sulcirostris (Brandt, 1837)	Australia and northern New Zealand	Size: Habitat: Diet:	LC
Indian cormorant	Phalacrocorax fuscicollis (Stephens, 1826)	Indian Subcontinent west to Sind and east to Thailand and Cambodia.	Size: Habitat: Diet:	LC
Cape cormorant	Phalacrocorax capensis (Sparrman, 1788)	the Congo, and up the east coast of South Africa as far as Mozambique.	Size: Habitat: Diet:	EN
Japanese cormorant or Temminck's cormorant	Phalacrocorax capillatus (Temminck & Schlegel, 1850) Genetically embedded in P. carbo and possibly better treated as a subspecies of it	Taiwan, north through Korea and Japan, to the Russian Far East.	Size: Habitat: Diet:	LC
Great cormorant or black shag	Phalacrocorax carbo (Linnaeus, 1758) Six subspecies: P. c. carbo; P. c. sinensis; P. c. hanedai; P. c. maroccanus; P. c. lucidus; P. c. novaehollandiae	Throughout the Old World, and Australia, New Zealand and the Atlantic coast of North America.	Size: Habitat: Diet:	LC

=== Taxonomic history ===
Formerly, the genus Phalacrocorax usually included all members of the family Phalacrocoracidae, or with the exception of only the flightless cormorant in its own genus Nannopterum. A study in 1988 examining skeletal structure combined with some ecological aspects recommended dividing the family into multiple genera, but was not widely followed. Later research showed that Microcarbo was readily separable with its morphological distinctiveness and the old age of its split from the remaining cormorants; all other cormorants were retained in a still-broad Phalacrocorax.

A 2014 study found Phalacrocrax to be the sister genus to Urile, which are thought to have split from each other between 8.9–10.3 million years ago. The IOC checklist went a step further in accepting Leucocarbo as well as Microcarbo as distinct (while retaining the rest in Phalacrocorax), but this treatment rendered Phalacrocorax paraphyletic (with some members much more closely related to Leucocarbo than others). Nowadays, due to the age of the splits between different cormorant clades, most authorities, including the IOC checklist, now accept seven cormorant genera, Microcarbo, Poikilocarbo, Phalacrocorax, Urile, Gulosus, Nannopterum, and Leucocarbo.
