= List of cormorants =

The International Ornithological Congress (IOC) recognizes these 40 species of cormorants and shags which are distributed among seven genera. One species, spectacled cormorant (formerly called Pallas's cormorant), is extinct.

This list is presented according to the IOC taxonomic sequence and can also be sorted alphabetically by common name and binomial.

Common name	Binomial name	IOC sequence
Pygmy cormorant	Microcarbo pygmaeus	1
Reed cormorant	Microcarbo africanus	2
Crowned cormorant	Microcarbo coronatus	3
Little cormorant	Microcarbo niger	4
Little pied cormorant	Microcarbo melanoleucos	5
Red-legged cormorant	Poikilocarbo gaimardi	6
Brandt's cormorant	Urile penicillatus	7
Red-faced cormorant	Urile urile	8
Pelagic cormorant	Urile pelagicus	9
Spectacled cormorant	Urile perspicillatus	10
Bank cormorant	Phalacrocorax neglectus	11
Socotra cormorant	Phalacrocorax nigrogularis	12
Pitt shag	Phalacrocorax featherstoni	13
Spotted shag	Phalacrocorax punctatus	14
Black-faced cormorant	Phalacrocorax fuscescens	15
Australian pied cormorant	Phalacrocorax varius	16
Little black cormorant	Phalacrocorax sulcirostris	17
Indian cormorant	Phalacrocorax fuscicollis	18
Cape cormorant	Phalacrocorax capensis	19
Japanese cormorant	Phalacrocorax capillatus	20
Great cormorant	Phalacrocorax carbo	21
European shag	Gulosus aristotelis	22
Flightless cormorant	Nannopterum harrisi	23
Neotropic cormorant	Nannopterum brasilianum	24
Double-crested cormorant	Nannopterum auritum	25
Rock shag	Leucocarbo magellanicus	26
Guanay cormorant	Leucocarbo bougainvilliorum	27
Bounty shag	Leucocarbo ranfurlyi	28
New Zealand king shag	Leucocarbo carunculatus	29
Chatham Islands shag	Leucocarbo onslowi	30
Stewart Island shag	Leucocarbo chalconotus	31
Auckland shag	Leucocarbo colensoi	32
Campbell shag	Leucocarbo campbelli	33
Imperial shag	Leucocarbo atriceps	34
South Georgia shag	Leucocarbo georgianus	35
Crozet shag	Leucocarbo melanogenis	36
Antarctic shag	Leucocarbo bransfieldensis	37
Kerguelen shag	Leucocarbo verrucosus	38
Heard Island shag	Leucocarbo nivalis	39
Macquarie shag	Leucocarbo purpurascens	40
