= List of Suliformes by population =

This is a list of Suliformes species by global population. While numbers are estimates, they have been made by the experts in their fields. For more information on how these estimates were ascertained, see Wikipedia's articles on population biology and population ecology.

Suliformes include the following families: Sulidae (gannets and boobies), Fregatidae (frigatebirds), Phalacrocoracidae (cormorants), Anhingidae (darters), and the Plotopteridae (flightless seabirds of the North Pacific that went extinct in the Miocene).

The IOC World Bird List (version 15.1) recognizes 60 species of Suliformes, one of which is extinct. As of December 2025, IUCN/BirdLife International have assessed 54 of these species (excepting Cocos booby and Imperial shag complex splits), 44 of which have population estimates. This list follows IUCN classifications for species names. Where IUCN classifications differ from other ornithological authorities, alternative names are noted.

Some members included in Suliformes are extinct:

- Spectacled cormorant (Urile perspicillatus) - largest known cormorant species, extinct since 1850s.

== Species by global population ==
Common name	Binomial name	Population	Status	Trend	Notes	Image
Rough-faced shag (New Zealand king shag)	Phalacrocorax carunculatus	250-999	VU	Steady	Total population estimated to be 350-1,500 individuals.	
Chatham Islands shag	Leucocarbo onslowi	710	CR	▼		
Pitt Island shag (Pitt shag)	Phalacrocorax featherstoni	868	EN	▼		
Bounty Island shag (Bounty shag)	Leucocarbo ranfurlyi	874-975	VU	Steady		
Flightless cormorant	Nannopterum harrisi	2,080	VU	Steady	Value provided is for total population.	
Christmas Island frigatebird (Christmas frigatebird)	Fregata andrewsi	2,400-5,000	VU	▼	Best estimate for breeding population is 3,700 mature individuals.	
Auckland Islands shag (Auckland shag)	Leucocarbo colensoi	3,000	VU	Steady		
Stewart Island shag	Leucocarbo chalconotus	3,300-5,300	VU	▼	Numbers may be overestimated.	
Crowned cormorant	Microcarbo coronatus	4,324	LC	Steady		
Bank cormorant	Phalacrocorax neglectus	5,000	EN	▼		
Abbott's booby	Papasula abbotti	6,000	EN	Steady		
Campbell Island shag (Campbell shag)	Leucocarbo campbelli	8,000	VU	Steady	Estimate hasn't been updated since 1975. Value given is for total population, but may be more representative of number of mature individuals.	
Oriental darter	Anhinga melanogaster	10,000-99,999	LC	▲	No formal population estimate has been conducted, but "the population probably numbers at least in the tens of thousands."	
Black-faced cormorant	Phalacrocorax fuscescens	10,000-99,999	LC	?	Total population "probably numbers several 10,000s of birds."	
Ascension frigatebird	Fregata aquila	17,000-21,000	VU	Steady		
African darter	Anhinga rufa	17,000-84,400	LC	Steady		
Red-legged cormorant	Poikilocarbo gaimardi	19,400-20,300	NT	▼		
Nazca booby	Sula granti	20,000-49,999	LC	▼	Minimum estimate.	
Great pied cormorant (Australian pied cormorant)	Phalacrocorax varius	23,300-83,300	LC	?	Total population is estimated to be 35,000-125,000 individuals.	
Little black cormorant	Phalacrocorax sulcirostris	23,300-683,000	LC	?	Total population is estimated to be 34,999-1,024,999 individuals.	
Japanese cormorant	Phalacrocorax capillatus	25,000-100,000	LC	?	Values given are for total population.	
Indian cormorant	Phalacrocorax fuscicollis	30,000	LC	?	Value given is for total population.	
Anhinga	Anhinga anhinga	33,300-133,000	LC	?		
Little pied cormorant	Microcarbo melanoleucos	36,000-201,000	LC	?	Values given are for total population.	
Pygmy cormorant	Microcarbo pygmaeus	87,300-113,000	LC	▲		
Blue-footed booby	Sula nebouxii	90,000	LC	▼		
Lesser frigatebird	Fregata ariel	100,000-499,999	LC	▼	Values given are for total population.	
Great frigatebird	Fregata minor	120,000	LC	▼		
Magnificent frigatebird	Fregata magnificens	130,000	LC	▼		
Long-tailed cormorant (Reed cormorant)	Microcarbo africanus	134,000-802,000	LC	Steady	Total population is estimated to be 200,500-1,202,500 individuals.	
Little cormorant	Microcarbo niger	183,000-233,000	LC	?	Total population is estimated to be 275,000-350,000 individuals.	
Brown booby	Sula leucogaster	>200,000	LC	▼	Minimum estimate. Note that IOC taxonomy splits an additional species, the Cocos booby, from this species. IUCN/BirdLife International maintain both species within S. leucogaster.	
Red-faced cormorant	Urile urile	>200,000	LC	▼	Minimum estimate.	
Socotra cormorant	Phalacrocorax nigrogularis	220,000	VU	▼		
Brandt's cormorant	Urile penicillatus	230,000	LC	▼	Value provided is for total population.	
European shag	Gulosus aristotelis	230,000-240,000	LC	▼	Values provided are for total population.	
Cape cormorant	Phalacrocorax capensis	234,000	EN	Steady		
Cape gannet	Morus capensis	246,000	EN	▼	Mature population only (123,080 pairs).	
Peruvian booby	Sula variegata	1,200,000	LC	Steady	Values given are for total population.	
Red-footed booby	Sula sula	1,400,000	LC	▼	Minimum estimate.	
Great cormorant	Phalacrocorax carbo	1,400,000-2,100,000	LC	▲	Values given are for total population.	
Northern gannet	Morus bassanus	1,500,000-1,800,000	LC	▲		
Neotropical cormorant (Neotropic cormorant)	Nannopterum brasilianum	2,000,000	LC	▲	Values given are for total population.	
Guanay cormorant	Leucocarbo bougainvilliorum	2,500,000 – 4,999,999	NT	▼	Values given are for total population.	

== Species without population estimates ==
Common name	Binomial name	Population	Status	Trend	Notes	Image
Australasian darter	Anhinga novaehollandiae	unknown	LC	Steady		
Imperial shag	Leucocarbo atriceps	unknown	LC	?	Note that IOC taxonomy splits five additional species, the South Georgia shag, Crozet shag, Antarctic shag, Heard Island shag, and Macquarie shag from this species. IUCN/BirdLife International maintain all species within L. atriceps.	
Rock shag (Magellanic cormorant)	Leucocarbo magellanicus	unknown	LC	?		
Kerguelen Islands shag (Kerguelen shag)	Leucocarbo verrucosus	unknown	LC	?		
Australasian gannet	Morus serrator	unknown	LC	▲		
Double-crested cormorant	Nannopterum auritum	unknown	LC	▲		
Masked booby	Sula dactylatra	unknown	LC	▼		
Spotted shag	Phalacrocorax punctatus	unknown	LC	?		
Pelagic cormorant	Urile pelagicus	unknown	LC	▼	Several national population estimates exist, but there is not enough data to form an estimate for global population.	

== See also ==
- Lists of birds by population
- Lists of organisms by population
