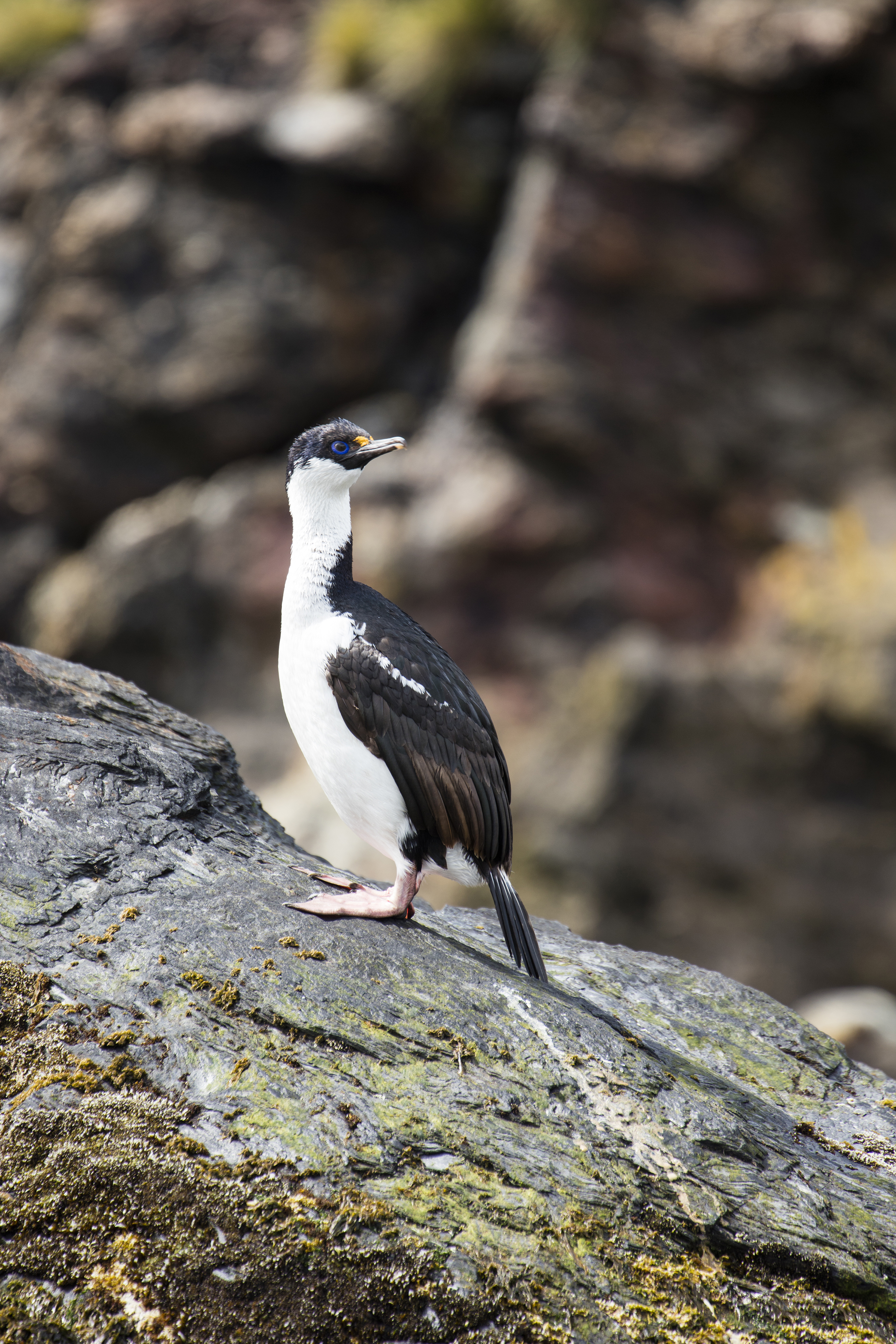
- South Georgia shag Phalacrocorax georgianus

Scientific classification
- Kingdom: Animalia
- Phylum: Chordata
- Class: Aves
- Order: Suliformes
- Family: Phalacrocoracidae
- Genus: Leucocarbo; Bonaparte, 1856

Type species
- Carbo bougainvillii (guanay cormorant) Lesson, 1837

Species
- See text

Synonyms
- Phalacrocorax (in part); Euleucocarbo Voisin, 1973; Nesocarbo Voisin, 1973; Notocarbo Siegel-Causey, 1988

= Blue-eyed shag =

Blue-eyed shags

Genus of birds

Leucocarbo is a genus of birds in the cormorant and shag family Phalacrocoracidae. Several species within the genus are collectively known as blue-eyed shags. This is a group of closely related cormorant taxa. Many have a blue, purple or red ring around the eye (not a blue iris); other shared features are white underparts (at least in some individuals) and pink feet.

They are found around the colder parts of the Southern Hemisphere, especially near southern South America, Antarctica, and New Zealand. Many are endemic to remote islands. Determining which types are species and which are subspecies of what larger species is problematic; various recent authorities have recognized from 8 to 14 species and have placed them in a variety of genera. The common names are even more confusing, "like myriad footprints criss-crossing in the snow and about as easy to disentangle." Only one common name is given for most species here.

== Taxonomy ==
The genus Leucocarbo was introduced in 1856 by the French naturalist Charles Lucien Bonaparte. He did not specify a type species but this was designated as the guanay cormorant by William Ogilvie-Grant in 1898. The name Leucocarbo combines the Ancient Greek leukos meaning "white" with the genus name Carbo introduced by Bernard Germain de Lacépède in 1799.

A molecular phylogenetic study published in 2014 found that Leucocarbo is sister to the American cormorants in the genus Nannopterum; the genera split between 6.7 - 8.0 million years ago.

The cladogram below showing the relationships between the species in the genus is based on a molecular phylogenetic study by Nicolas Rawlence and collaborators that was published in 2022.

- Leucocarbo
  - Rock shag – Leucocarbo magellanicus
  - - Guanay cormorant – Leucocarbo bougainvillii
    - - Imperial shag – Leucocarbo atriceps
      - - Bounty shag – Leucocarbo ranfurlyi
        - - New Zealand king shag – Leucocarbo carunculatus
          - - Chatham shag – Leucocarbo onslowi
            - - Stewart Island shag – Leucocarbo chalconotus
              - - Auckland shag – Leucocarbo colensoi
                - Campbell shag – Leucocarbo campbelli

The genus contains 15 species:

| Image | Scientific name | Common name | Distribution |
|---|---|---|---|
| | Leucocarbo magellanicus | Rock shag or Magellanic cormorant | The coast of Argentina, Uruguay and southern Chile. |
| | Leucocarbo bougainvillii | Guanay cormorant | The western coast of South America (Extirpated from Argentina). |
| | Leucocarbo ranfurlyi | Bounty shag | Bounty Islands. |
| | Leucocarbo carunculatus | New Zealand king shag, rough-faced shag or kawau | New Zealand. |
| | Leucocarbo onslowi | Chatham shag | Chatham Islands. |
| | Leucocarbo chalconotus | Stewart Island shag | Eastern coast of New Zealand. |
| | Leucocarbo colensoi | Auckland shag | Auckland Islands. |
| | Leucocarbo campbelli | Campbell shag | Campbell Island. |
| | Leucocarbo atriceps | Imperial shag or blue-eyed shag | Southern Chile and Argentina. |
| | Leucocarbo georgianus | South Georgia shag | South Georgia and the Shag Rocks. |
| | Leucocarbo melanogenis | Crozet shag | Crozet Island, Prince Edward Islands and Marion Island. |
| | Leucocarbo bransfieldensis | Antarctic shag | The Antarctic Peninsula, South Shetland Islands and Elephant Island. |
| | Leucocarbo verrucosus | Kerguelen shag | Kerguelen Islands. |
| | Leucocarbo nivalis | Heard Island shag | Heard and McDonald Islands. |
| | Leucocarbo purpurascens | Macquarie shag | Macquarie Island. |
