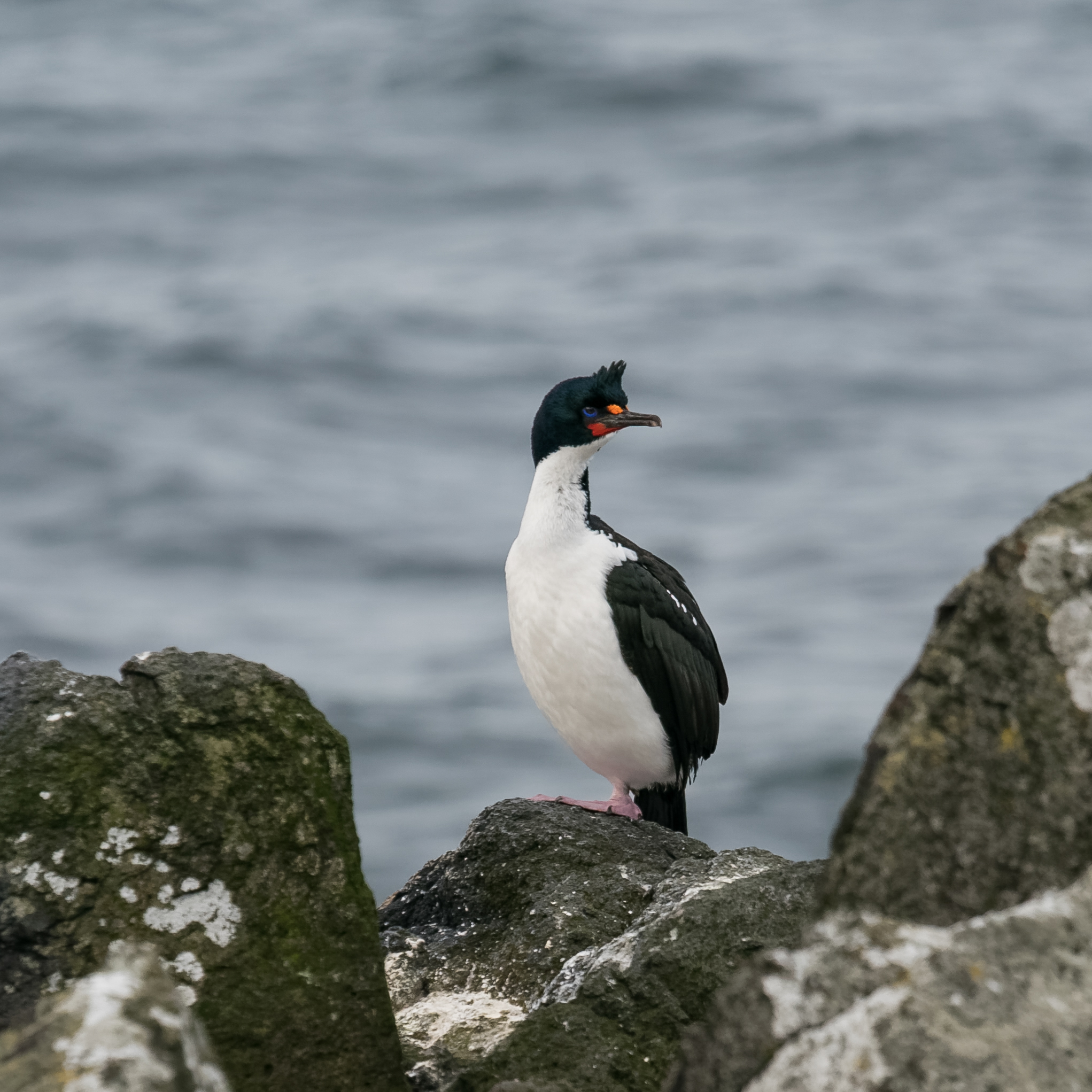

Conservation status
- Critically Endangered (IUCN 3.1)

Scientific classification
- Kingdom: Animalia
- Phylum: Chordata
- Class: Aves
- Order: Suliformes
- Family: Phalacrocoracidae
- Genus: Leucocarbo
- Species: L. onslowi

Binomial name
- Leucocarbo onslowi (Forbes, 1893)

Synonyms
- Phalacrocorax onslowi

= Chatham Islands shag =

Species of bird

The Chatham Islands shag (Leucocarbo onslowi), also known as the Chatham shag, is a species of bird in the cormorant and shag family, Phalacrocoracidae. It is endemic to the Chatham Islands of New Zealand. For a long time the species was placed in the genus Phalacrocorax; today it is mostly placed with the other blue-eyed shags of New Zealand and Antarctica in the genus Leucocarbo. Its closest relative is the Otago shag of South Island.

This is a large, pied shag with a long crest. It is highly coastal, rarely foraging far from shore, although sometimes feeds in the large and brackish Te Whanga Lagoon. It forages for fish and cephalopods and roosts on rocky shores. The species is colonial, breeding in small colonies around the Chatham Islands. Little is known about its breeding behaviour. The species is threatened by introduced predators, disturbance at its breeding colonies and habitat loss.

== Taxonomy ==
- - - New Zealand king shag
    - †Kohatu shag
  - - - Otago shag
      - Chatham Islands shag
    - Foveaux shag

Phylogeny of the Blue-eyed shags of North, South and the Chatham Islands, showing the position of the Chatham Islands shag, based on Rawlence et al, 2017

Henry Forbes described the Chatham Islands shag as Phalacrocorax onslowi in 1893, although it had been mentioned at the Royal Society Te Apārangi in 1871 by William Travers (New Zealand politician), sharing field notes from his son Henry Travers (naturalist). The specific name commemorates William Onslow, 4th Earl of Onslow, who was the Governor of New Zealand between 1889 and 1892.

The question of which genus to place the species in has, like the general question of the taxonomy of the cormorants and shags on the whole, been a long-standing mystery. It was long retained in Phalacrocorax along with the rest of the family when the family was treated as monogeneric. It was also placed in the genus Euleucocarbo along with the other "blue-eyed shags" found in New Zealand. The species has sometimes been considered a subspecies of an enlarged New Zealand king shag species (Leucocarbo carunculatus). Most recently a 2014 study of the mitochondrial and nuclear DNA of the family placed it within the New Zealand blue-eyed shags and the other Antarctic blue-eyed shags in the genus Leucocarbo. This arrangement has also been adopted by the International Ornithologists' Union. The same study found that its closest relative was the species formerly known as Stewart shag. Since 2016, the Stewart shag is now treated as two species, the Otago and Foveaux shags. The same study that split these two species also found that the Chatham Islands shag is closely related to the Otago shag and that this pair are in turn a sister clade to the Foveaux shag. These three species are in turn related to the New Zealand king shag and an extinct Leucocarbo species, the Kohatu shag, from the far north of New Zealand.

"Chatham Islands shag" has been designated as the official common name for the species by the IOC. The species is also known as the "Chatham Island shag".

== Description ==
An adult Chatham Islands shag is 63 cm (25 in) in length and weighs around 1,790–2,400 g (63–85 oz). It is a large pied shag with a white throat, breast, belly and patches on the scapulars of the wings, and black or black-brown elsewhere. When breeding the head and hind-neck have a blue metallic sheen, the wings and mantle have a greenish sheen and the rest of the black areas have a purplish-blue sheen. The head has a prominent crest and there are white filoplumes on the neck. Adults have a red gular sac and orange-red caruncles on the face and the gape of the mouth. In spite of the common name of the genus the iris of the eye is brown, and the eye has a violet eye-ring. The bill is dark grey, with a bright red mouth, and the legs and feet are dull pink. Non-breeding birds look similar to breeding birds but are duller, have no crest or filoplumes, and duller bare parts. The caruncles are yellow, the eye-ring blue, the mouth orange and the bill is light-grey.

== Distribution and habitat ==
The Chatham Islands shag is, as its name suggests, endemic to the Chatham Islands of New Zealand.

The species is endemic to the Chatham Islands, an archipelago around 700 km (430 mi) to the east of New Zealand. In the Chathams it is an inshore species, rarely going more than a few kilometres away from shore, and it is more commonly found in sheltered water such as bays and inlets. It also forages in the large brackish Te Whanga Lagoon. It breeds in colonies on coastal areas and around Te Whanga Lagoon, either on flat areas, slopes or wide cliff ledges. There are currently thirteen colonies of this species, found on the main Chatham Island as well as Pitt Island, Star Keys, Rabbit Island and North East Reef. These colonies are located close to the high-tide mark and can have as many as 300 nests in them. It roosts on rocks close to shore or at sea, although it may have different roosting sites for day and night. The species is non-migratory and has never been recorded away from the Chatham Islands, although the species does feed and roost on islands in the Chathams away from their breeding colonies, for example Mangere.

== Behaviour ==
=== Diet and feeding ===
Like all cormorants, the Chatham Islands shag is a pursuit-diver, propelling itself underwater with its feet and returning to the surface to consume small prey caught in its bill. The specific diet of the Chatham Islands shag is poorly known, but is dominated by fish, including opalfish, flatfish and bullies, as well as cephalopods such as octopuses, squid and cuttlefish. It generally feeds alone, but will form small feeding flocks at times.

=== Breeding ===
Little is known about the breeding biology. Males attract a mate with an advertising display in which it stands with its tail cocked up and throws its neck and head back towards its tail, up to 13 times, while making a gargling noise. Mated pairs recognise each other at the nest with gaping and head-lowering displays. During these the male makes a barking noise, but the female is almost silent, making only a soft puffing noise.

Breeding is seasonal, and the timing of laying can vary from colony to colony. Most Chatham Islands shags lay between October and December, but the colonies on Te Whanga Lagoon breed three months earlier than other colonies. The nest is made of iceplant, grasses and other plants. Small nesting territories are defended from others of the species, and birds nesting in the centre of the colony have to run the gauntlet of biting to reach their nests as they pass other territories. Two to four eggs are laid; the eggs measure 59 to 63 mm (2.3–2.5 in) × 37 to 40 mm (1.5–1.6 in) and are matt pale blue with a chalky covering. The incubation time is not known but is thought to be around 30 days.

== Conservation ==
The Chatham Islands shag is threatened by a range of human activities and threats. The species is sensitive to disturbance at its breeding colonies, as nests are trampled by stampeding adults and nests are opportunistically raided by silver gulls after the eggs are unattended. At worst, entire colonies have been abandoned due to disturbance by people or stock. Colonies on the main islands are also vulnerable to introduced predators such as weka, feral cats and possums. It is considered critically endangered by the IUCN.
