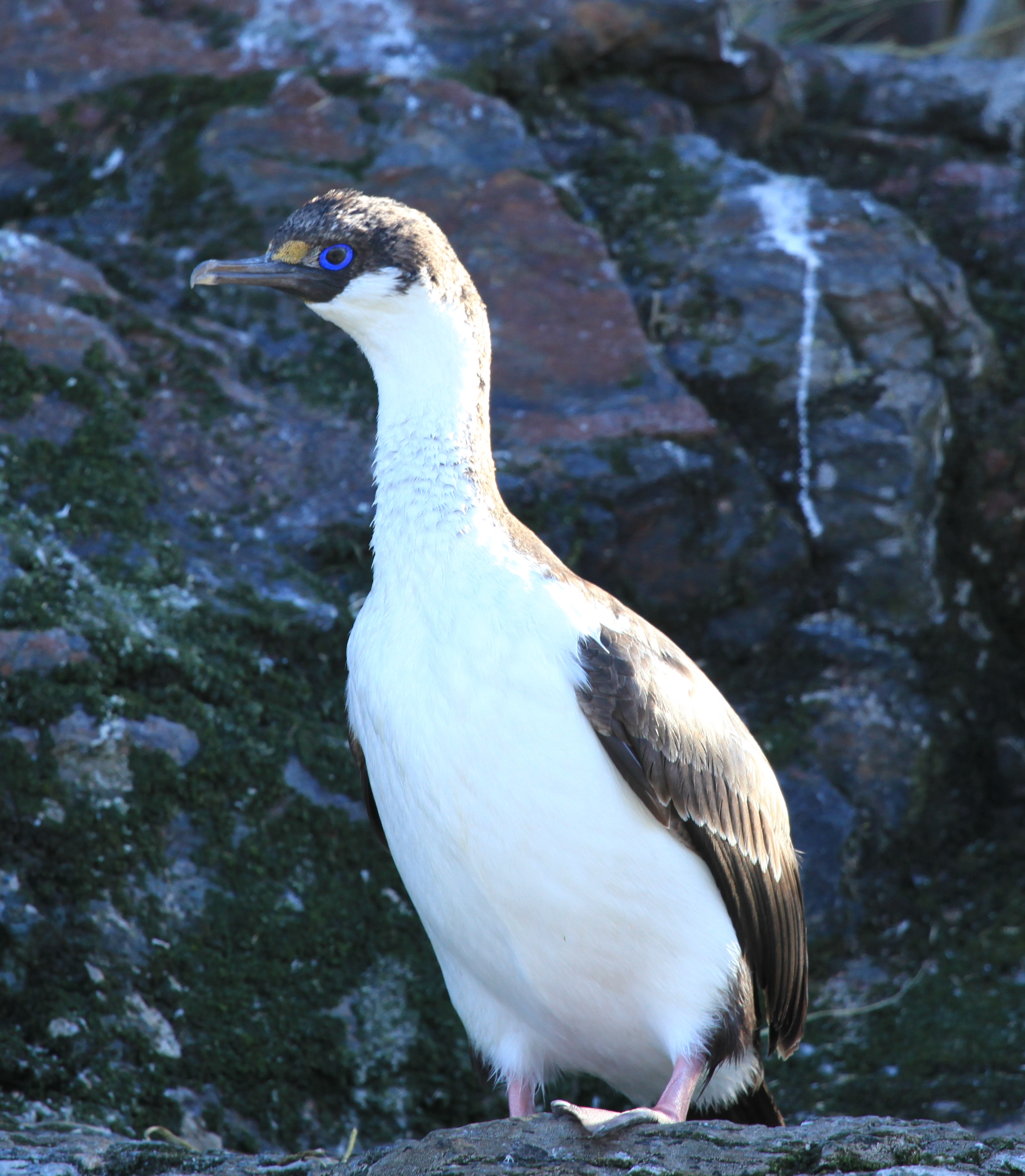
- At Cooper Bay, South Georgia

Scientific classification
- Kingdom: Animalia
- Phylum: Chordata
- Class: Aves
- Order: Suliformes
- Family: Phalacrocoracidae
- Genus: Leucocarbo
- Species: L. georgianus

Binomial name
- Leucocarbo georgianus (Lönnberg, 1906)
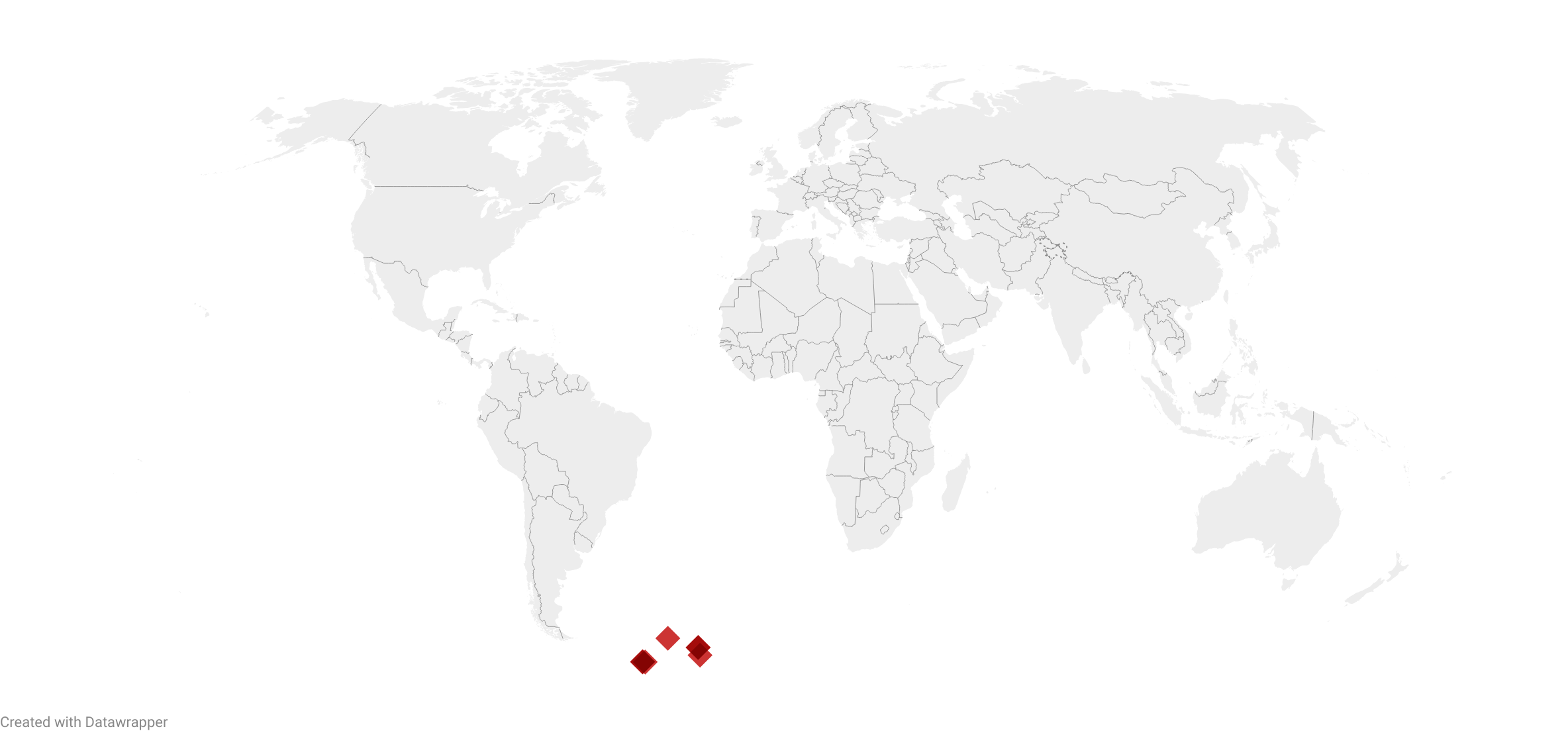
- Global range

Synonyms
- Phalacrocorax georgianus; Phalacrocorax atriceps georgianus

= South Georgia shag =

Species of bird

The South Georgia shag (Leucocarbo georgianus), also known as the South Georgia cormorant, is a marine cormorant native to South Georgia and a few other subantarctic islands in the South Atlantic Ocean.

Its lifespan is approximately 11 years.

== Description ==
The South Georgia shag has similar shape to a blue-eyed shag, but slightly bigger in size. Body length of a South Georgia shag is around 72–75 cm (28–30 in), with a wingspan of 54–60.8 cm (21.3–23.9 in). Males usually has a longer wingspan and tail length than female shag. South Georgia shag can reach 2.5–2.9 kg (5.5–6.4 lb).

The South Georgia shag has a strong, long beak, with grooves on both sides of the upper beak and a hook at the end of the beak for pecking at fish. A throat pouch at the base of the lower beak. It has small nostrils, which are completely hidden in the adult. The neck is slender. Two wings are of moderate length and lack the fifth secondary flight feather. Tail is rounded and stiffly straight, with 12–14 tail feathers. Cannot fly if the feathers are wet.

== Diet ==
It feeds primarily on demersal-benthic fish, as well as molluscs and polychaetes.

== Breeding ==
The breeding season occurs in October to December. The female lays 2–3 greyish or bluish eggs during the breeding period, which will be incubated by both parents for 28–31 days. Chicks continuously brood for 12–15 days and leave the nest at two months and fledge at around 65 days.

== Taxonomy ==
The South Georgia shag is one of the blue-eyed shags (genus Leucocarbo), although some authors have placed it in the genus Phalacrocorax. It has formerly been considered a subspecies of the imperial shag (L. atriceps), but it is now usually treated as a full species. It is usually considered to be restricted to South Georgia and Shag Rocks, with populations in the South Sandwich Islands and South Orkney Islands now referred to as a distinct species; the Antarctic shag (P. bransfieldensis).
