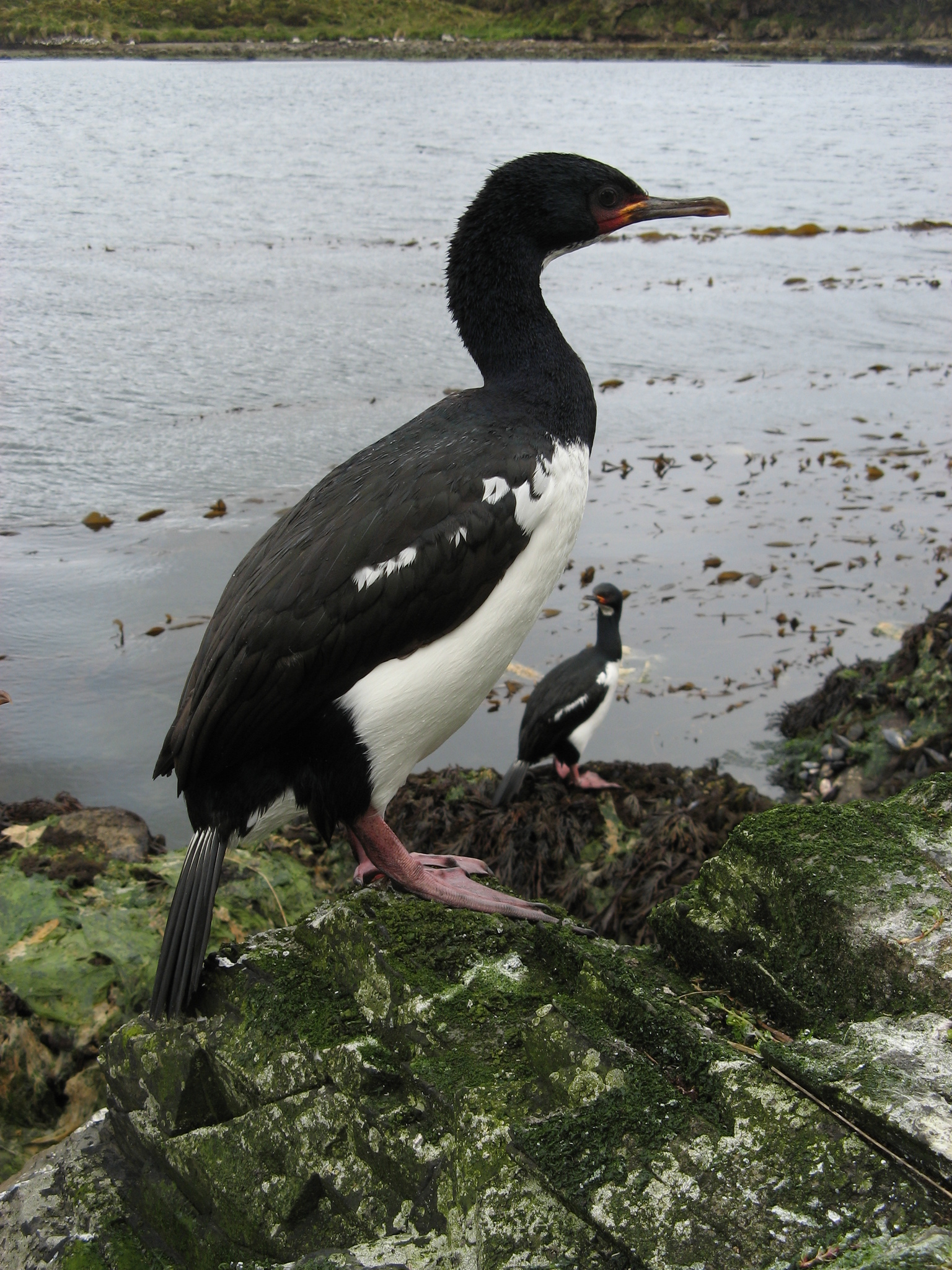
- on Campbell Island

Conservation status
- Vulnerable (IUCN 3.1)

Scientific classification
- Kingdom: Animalia
- Phylum: Chordata
- Class: Aves
- Order: Suliformes
- Family: Phalacrocoracidae
- Genus: Leucocarbo
- Species: L. campbelli

Binomial name
- Leucocarbo campbelli (Filhol, 1878)
- Native range

Synonyms
- Phalacrocorax campbelli

= Campbell shag =

Species of bird

The Campbell shag (Leucocarbo campbelli), also known as the Campbell Island shag, is a species of bird in the family Phalacrocoracidae. It is endemic to Campbell Island, one of the New Zealand outlying islands. Its natural habitats are open seas and rocky shores. It is a medium-sized bird, around 63 cm in length, with a wingspan of 105 cm, weighing between 1.6 – 2 kg. They only breed on Campbell Island]and forage within 10 km of the island. Its unique, looped head and elongated beak allow to easily feed on shellfish and marine invertebrates. This is done through foraging dive cycles of high speed and efficiency.

Some taxonomic authorities, including the International Ornithologists' Union, place this species in the genus Leucocarbo. Others place it in the genus Phalacrocorax.

== Taxonomy ==
Since L. campbelli evolved on Campbell Island and can only be found there, it is named for this region, 700 km south of New Zealand. The closest relative of the Campbell Island shag is the Auckland Island shag, which, similarly, is endemic to New Zealand and only lives in the Auckland Islands. They are both part of the Leucocarbo genus, also known as the blue-eyed shags, and are grouped together with four other New Zealand shag species to form the "pink-footed shag" group. The blue-eyed shags are named for their blue eye rings and lids, but five of the Leucocarbo species have eye rings and lids that are not blue. Furthermore, there are shag and cormorant species outside of this genus that have blue eye rings.

=== Evolutionary history ===
Blue eyed shag species dispersed from South America during the Pliocene or Early Pleistocene due to cycles of glaciation. Many made their way to New Zealand and speciation occurred due to the geographic isolation on the various islands in the area.

Biologists have long differed in their phylogenetic organisation of cormorants and shags. The species have been grouped together by bone structure, behaviour, and, more recently, by genetic analysis. A 2000 study on cormorant and shag phylogeny found that foot colour might be an indicator of a close genetic relationship in these birds.

== Description ==
The Campbell Island shag is a marine bird with black and white plumage and pink feet. They have a white chin, underparts and wing patches, with a black neck, throat and head. Their black feathers have a metallic greenish blue sheen. In breeding season, adult birds have a head crest, a yellow line above the bill's gape, and facial skin and throat pouch that can range from purple to orange. Juveniles and non-breeding adults have browner plumage instead of all black, as well as duller skin and throat pouches. Nestlings are born naked with black skin. Campbell Island shags have dark brown irises and purplish eye rings. Their bills are greyish brown, and pinkish orange at the tip with a yellow patch at the base.

== Habitat and distribution ==
The Campbell Island shag can only be found on the Campbell Islands and is the only shag present. They can usually be found in enclosed areas like harbours and rocky beaches, but have been known to rest on coastal landforms after foraging in the sea. They tend to stay within 10 km of the main island and remain in shallower waters. A 1975 census counted 1300 nests on the Island, with an estimated 2000 breeding pairs and 8000 total individuals. Different estimates have considered this an over- or underestimation.

== Behaviour ==
=== Reproduction ===
Campbell Island shags only breed on Campbell Island and surrounding coastal landforms. Their breeding season lasts from November to February, in enclosed spaces near the water, like caves, alcoves, covered ledges, and beneath overhanging rocks, where they build flat bowls of twigs as nests. They nest in colonies during their breeding season, with up to 150 pairs and 2 light blue eggs per pair.

As of 2000, the New Zealand Department of Conservation reported that "the timing of breeding, laying dates, descriptions of eggs and nestlings, incubation period, incubation shifts, chick growth rates and nestling period, post fledgling dependence period etc. are all unknown and need study".

Campbell Island shags perform elaborate courtship dances with penguin-walking, horizontal standing, posing with the rump in the air, swinging their heads, crest-lowering, bouncing and vocalising. Once mated, pairs greet each other by shaking their bills back and forth.

=== Diet and foraging ===
Campbell Island shags forage in flocks of 30 to 100 individuals and fly with their heads below their bodies. They have a specific hunting technique of fanning out over the water, dipping their heads and wings in the water, and then all jumping in the air at the same time to dive and catch their prey. They spend a considerable amount of time underwater, swimming far and surfacing in a scattered pattern. According to a 2015 study, cormorant and shag foraging behaviour seems to depend on light availability. The researchers attached data loggers to the birds to determine how deep they were going for food, and found that, in darker conditions like early morning, the birds dive in shallower waters than they do in bright conditions. This leads them to believe that the cormorant and shag family does use their sight when foraging even though they appear to have poor vision underwater.

Though their diet has not been defined, we know that they consume small shoaling fish and marine invertebrates. Other birds with similar diets, like Cape petrels, Antarctic terns and red-billed gulls, sometimes join the shags' foraging flocks.

=== Predators ===
Skuas are known to occasionally take young shags and eggs, but there are no longer any introduced predators of Campbell Island Shags. In 2003, the island was officially declared "rat-free" after 200 years of introduced Norway rats causing a decline in the seabird population, and two years of poison pellets sent to control the pests. The rats arrived from sealing and whaling boats, and were considered the densest population of rats in the world before their eradication. That being said, the rats were not considered a threat to Campbell Island shag breeding success. Similarly, feral cats were not considered a threat because they could not access their nesting sites. In the 1980s, it was also assumed that all feral cats on the island had died out. As of now, there are no known predators that could lead to the extinction of the species.

=== Vocalizations ===
There is little information on their vocalisations, other than that, when they leave the breeding colonies, they are silent. It is known that male and female Campbell Island shags have different courtship behaviour, including male shags barking during displays, but this has not been thoroughly described. The New Zealand Department of Conservation recommended in the year 2000 that all the pink-footed shags be studied using modern DNA techniques and trait comparisons, including vocalisations.

=== Wing drying ===
Like other shags and cormorants, Campbell Island shags spread their wings in the sun or wind after spending time in the water. They are some of the only aquatic birds that have this habit. Though some have suggested this behaviour is due to their skeletal structure and compensates for bad balance, this is unlikely to be the case. Cormorants and shags have a different feather structure than other aquatic birds, making them less water-repellent. This deficient waterproofing has been used as evidence that their wing-spreading is a way for the birds to dry off.

== Relationship to humans ==
Since Campbell Island is uninhabited, there has been no noted impact from the Campbell Island shags onto any culture. The only effect humans could potentially have on the animals is climate change.

== Conservation and management ==
A report on seabird breeding in the same region as Campbell Island for the Ornithological Society of New Zealand stated that seabirds are among the most threatened birds and this will worsen due to climate change and pollution. Because of warming seas, foraging and breeding will become more difficult. However, thanks to their vulnerabilities, species like shags in New Zealand could be used as a way for scientists to monitor these changes.

Some risks that other seabirds face around the world are not worries for Campbell Island shags. For example, visitors and tourism are not considered a threat. Moreover, because fishing is illegal within the species' range, bycatch is not a risk.

The New Zealand Department of Conservation recommends that pest quarantine measures are taken on Campbell Island and a quick emergency response is prepared for any new introductions. They also recommend that a regular census is established to evaluate the breeding population.
