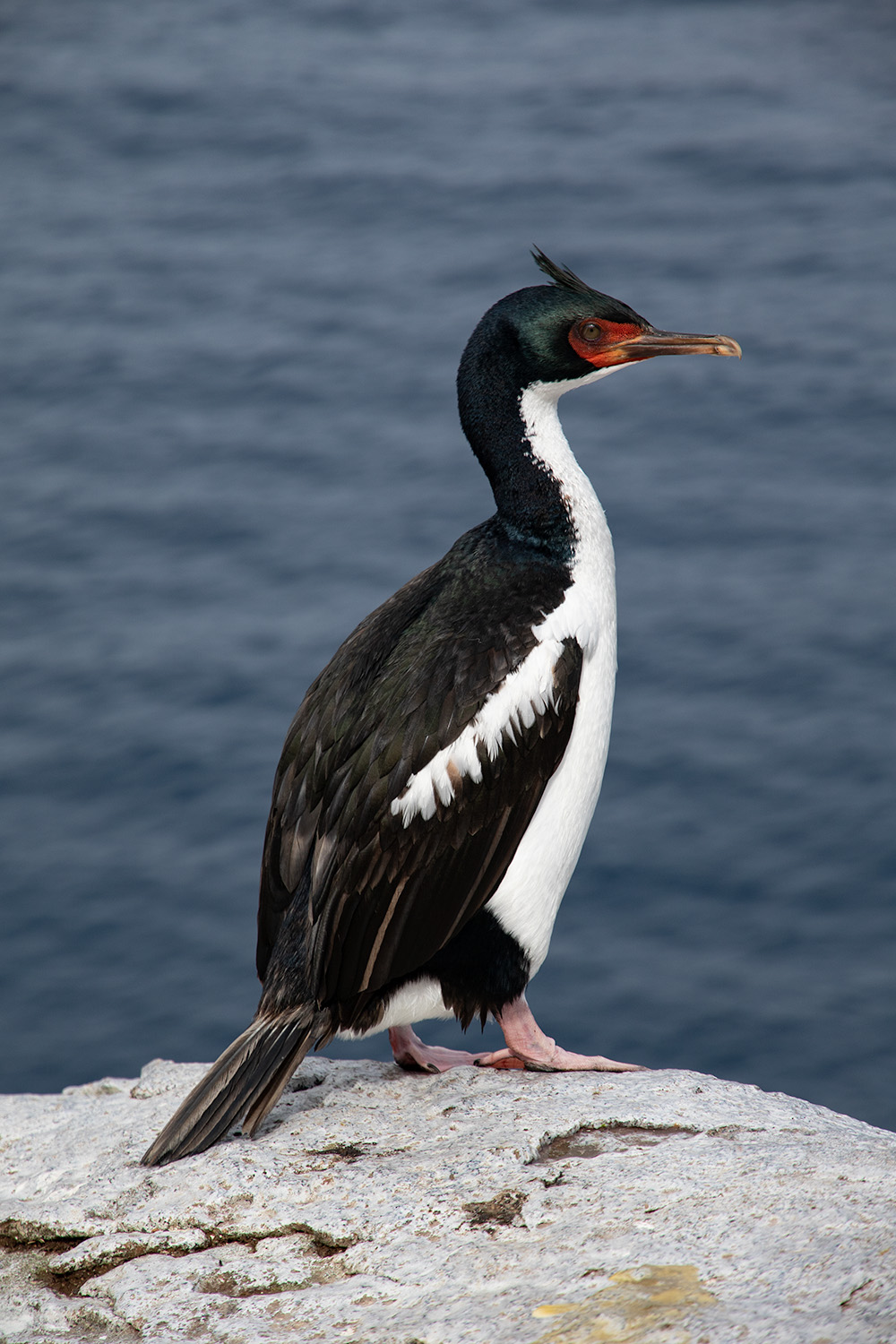
- on Proclamation Island, Bounty Islands.

Conservation status
- Vulnerable (IUCN 3.1)

Scientific classification
- Kingdom: Animalia
- Phylum: Chordata
- Class: Aves
- Order: Suliformes
- Family: Phalacrocoracidae
- Genus: Leucocarbo
- Species: L. ranfurlyi

Binomial name
- Leucocarbo ranfurlyi (Ogilvie-Grant, 1901)
- Native range

Synonyms
- Phalacrocorax ranfurlyi

= Bounty shag =

Species of bird

The Bounty shag (Leucocarbo ranfurlyi), also known as the Bounty Island shag, is a species of cormorant of the family Phalacrocoracidae. They are found only on the tiny and remote Subantarctic Bounty Islands, 670 km (420 mi) southeast of New Zealand. Its natural habitats are open seas and rocky shores. In 2022, a full unmanned aerial vehicle survey of the Bounty archipelago found a total of 573 breeding pairs and estimates the population to consist of approximately 1,733 birds. These recent estimates are consistent with the only other comparable study from 1978 and suggest that the species' population has remained stable over the past 45 years.

Some taxonomic authorities, including the International Ornithologists' Union, place this species in the genus Leucocarbo. Others place it in the genus Phalacrocorax.

They construct nests on cliff ledges using brown seaweed, and breed during October, with chicks hatching from late November to early December.

== Description ==
Size; 71 cm (28 in). Large, black-and-white cormorant. Black head, hind neck, lower back, rump, uppertail-coverts, all with metallic blue sheen. White underparts. Pink feet. White patches on wings appear as bar when folded. Caruncles absent. Voice: Male makes call during displays only.

IUCN classifies this species as Vulnerable because its very small population and breeding range renders it susceptible to stochastic events and human impacts. However, some data indicates that its population is presently stable. The Bounty Islands are a nature reserve and are free of introduced predators. In 1998, they were declared part of a UNESCO World Heritage Site. The islands are uninhabited and are seldom visited, so human interference is minimal.
