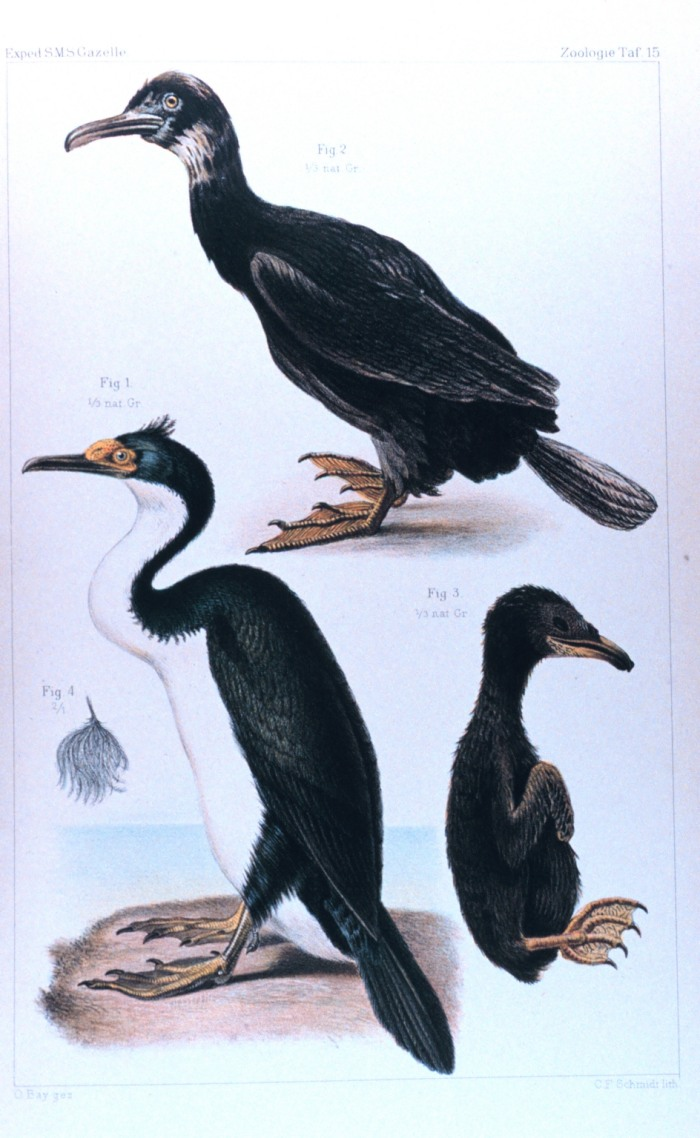
- Immature (top), adult (left), and chick

Conservation status
- Least Concern (IUCN 3.1)

Scientific classification
- Kingdom: Animalia
- Phylum: Chordata
- Class: Aves
- Order: Suliformes
- Family: Phalacrocoracidae
- Genus: Leucocarbo
- Species: L. verrucosus

Binomial name
- Leucocarbo verrucosus (Cabanis, 1875)

Synonyms
- Phalacrocorax verrucosus

= Kerguelen shag =

Species of bird

The Kerguelen shag (Leucocarbo verrucosus) is a species of cormorant endemic to the Kerguelen Islands in the southern Indian Ocean, one of the most isolated places on Earth. Many authorities consider it a subspecies of the imperial shag.

== Range and habitat ==
This species nests on the coast of Grande Terre (the main island of the archipelago), on offshore islands, and on islands in the Golfe du Morbihan. It forages at sea throughout the archipelago, usually within 6 km (3.7 mi) of shore and especially in bays and inlets, though immatures have been seen rarely as far as 80 km (50 mi). Reports from Heard Island and western Australia may be of ship-assisted birds.

In the austral summer it feeds among kelp, sometimes at the bottom.

== Description ==
The Kerguelen shag is 65 cm (25.5 in) long with a wingspan of 110 cm (43.5 in), making it the smallest blue-eyed shag. The adult's upperparts, tail, and thighs are metallic greenish black; the underbody to the throat is white; and the wing linings are brown. Some individuals have white patches on the back and wings. The head and the back of the neck are deep blue or purple, except that a black cap reaches below the eye to the chin and ear coverts. The face and throat pouch are dark brown, ornamented with yellow-orange tubercles. The bill is horn-colored or brown; the eyes are hazel. The legs and feet vary from dark brown to dark-blotched bright pink. Breeding adults have a little black erectile crest on the forehead, yellow or orange caruncles (large warts) above the base of the bill, and a bright blue ring around the eye. After the breeding season, the plumage fades, the eye-ring becomes lead-blue, and the caruncles become smaller and duller-colored.

Juveniles are dark brown with varying amounts of white underneath and brown iris, bill, and feet. They have no caruncles, and their eye-rings are lead-blue. They acquire adult plumage gradually.

Unlike many cormorants, this species does not spread its wings when it is perched.

== Feeding ==
Kerguelen shags presumably eat mostly fish and such invertebrates as echinoderms, crustaceans, and polychaete worms. In summer they mostly forage alone, but from May to October they form linear flocks of several hundred, diving and surfacing sequentially down the line.

== Reproduction ==
This species breeds in colonies, usually of 3 to 30 pairs but occasionally up to 400. Colonies may be near those of southern rockhopper penguins. There is a period of nest-building and displaying in late March and early April—an unusual time for a subantarctic cormorant. Advertising males display by throwing the head back till the nape touches the tail. Nests are cones of seaweed, twigs, and grass held together with mud and guano, up to 1 meter tall and 33 cm across, with a cup averaging 20 cm across and 8 cm deep. Nests that survive may be reused, perhaps not by the same pair. Breeding activity starts as early as September, but laying usually starts at some point from late October to late November and lasts till mid January; the times vary considerably among colonies. The clutch comprises two to four eggs, about 6.2 cm long and 3.9 cm wide. The second egg is laid 2 or 3 days after the first. Both parents incubate for an average of 29 days. Both protect the chicks from predation by skuas, gulls, and sheathbills, which nevertheless take some chicks. Chicks hatch black with a pink throat and develop blackish-brown down with greyish-white tufts. Other aspects of reproductive behavior and success are unknown.

The population was about 6,000 to 7,000 pairs in 1984–1987. Interactions with human beings and introduced mammals do not appear to be damaging the population.

== Classification ==
This species has been placed in genera Halieus, Hypoleucos, Notocarbo, and Leucocarbo. Others place it in the genus Phalacrocorax. It has been considered conspecific with some other blue-eyed shags under the name imperial shag. Here it is considered a separate species following the Handbook of the Birds of the World and other authorities

It has been suggested that Heard shags may visit the Kerguelens and that Kerguelen shags with white wing or back patches are the result of hybridization.

== Etymology ==
The epithet verrucosus means "full of warts", referring to the facial ornaments.
