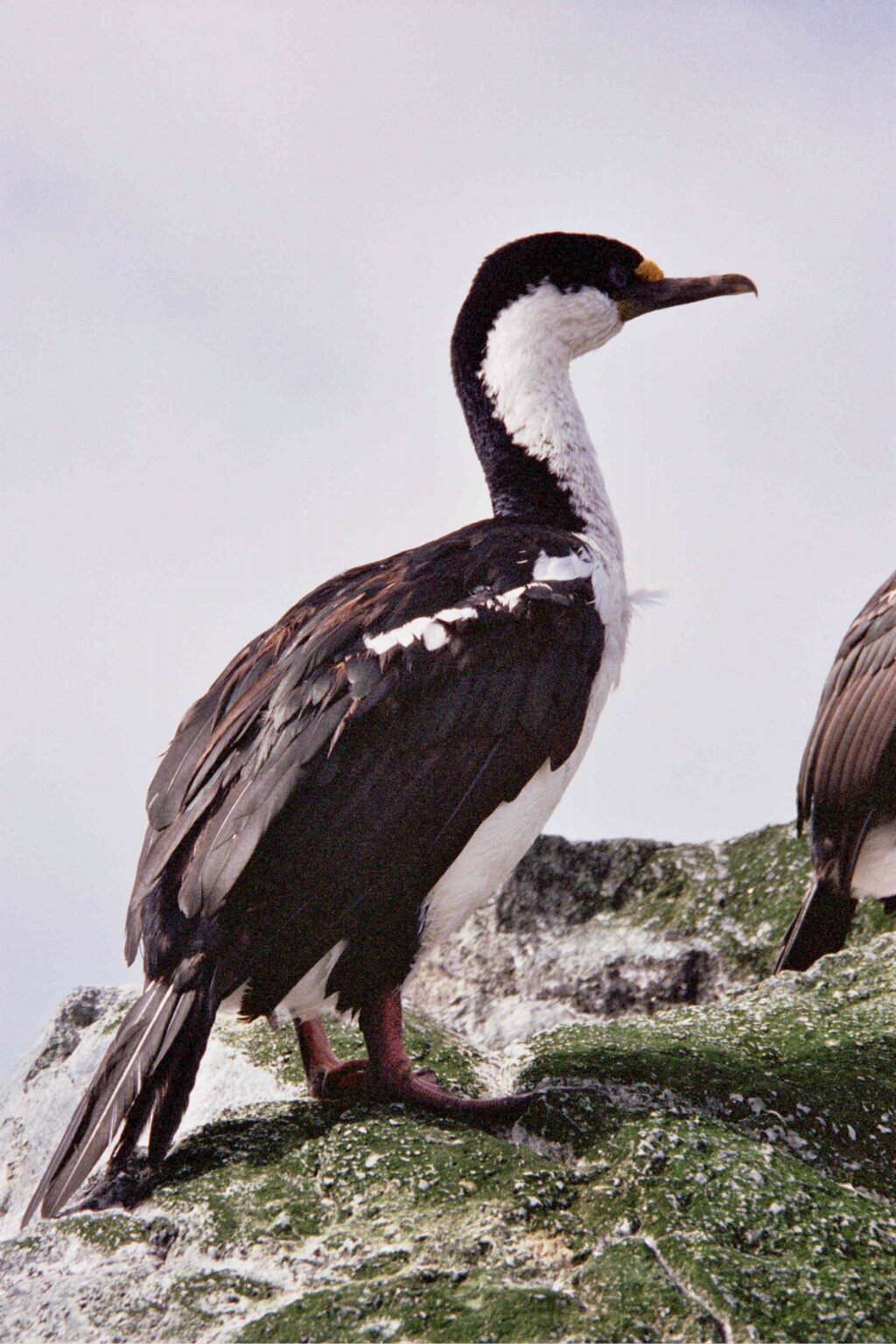

Scientific classification
- Kingdom: Animalia
- Phylum: Chordata
- Class: Aves
- Order: Suliformes
- Family: Phalacrocoracidae
- Genus: Leucocarbo
- Species: L. purpurascens

Binomial name
- Leucocarbo purpurascens (Brandt, JF, 1837)

Synonyms
- Leucocarbo atriceps purpurascens; Phalacrocorax purpurascens; Notocarbo purpurascens

= Macquarie shag =

Species of cormorant

The Macquarie shag (Leucocarbo purpurascens), Macquarie Island shag or Macquarie Island cormorant, is a marine cormorant native to Macquarie Island in the Southern Ocean, about halfway between Australia and Antarctica.

== Taxonomy ==
The Macquarie shag is one of the blue-eyed shags, sometimes placed in the genera Leucocarbo or Notocarbo. Others place it in the genus Phalacrocorax. It is now usually considered to be a full species.

== Distribution and habitat ==
The Macquarie shag is restricted to subantarctic Macquarie Island and the nearby Bishop and Clerk Islets, part of the Macquarie group, 33 km to the south. Apart from breeding and roosting, its habitat is marine.

== Description ==
The Macquarie shag has largely black upperparts and white underparts. The upper cheeks and ear-coverts are black; there are white bars on the wings, a black, recurved crest over the forehead, and pink feet. A breeding adult has a pair of orange caruncles above the base of the bill in front of the eyes, orange-brown facial skin at the base of the lower mandible, as well as blue eye-rings. It is about 75 cm in length, with a wingspan of 110 cm and a weight of 2.5–3.5 kg.

== Behaviour ==
Macquarie shags are gregarious, roosting in groups of from a few birds up to several hundred.

=== Breeding ===
The birds are present all year round at Macquarie Island, where they breed annually in small to large colonies on bare rocky shores and stacks. Nest-building takes place from June. Nests are truncated cones, 20–30 cm in height, built of vegetation, guano and mud. The clutch of two or three eggs is laid between mid-September and January, mainly in late September and early November, with most eggs hatching by late December. Most chicks are independent of their parents by mid-February.

=== Feeding ===
The birds forage locally in shallow coastal waters, with the diet consisting primarily of benthic fish. Flocks may feed together.

== Status and conservation ==
The Macquarie shag population was estimated in 2000 to comprise about 760 breeding pairs, including 100 pairs at the Bishop and Clerk Islets. A later (October 2003) survey found 472 nesting pairs in eleven colonies on Macquarie Island itself, indicating a 30% decline.

The taxon is listed as Vulnerable under Australia's Environment Protection and Biodiversity Conservation Act 1999, because the population is small, localised and subject to fluctuations in breeding success due to weather conditions and food availability. Other threats include predation of nestlings by Subantarctic skuas and black rats.
