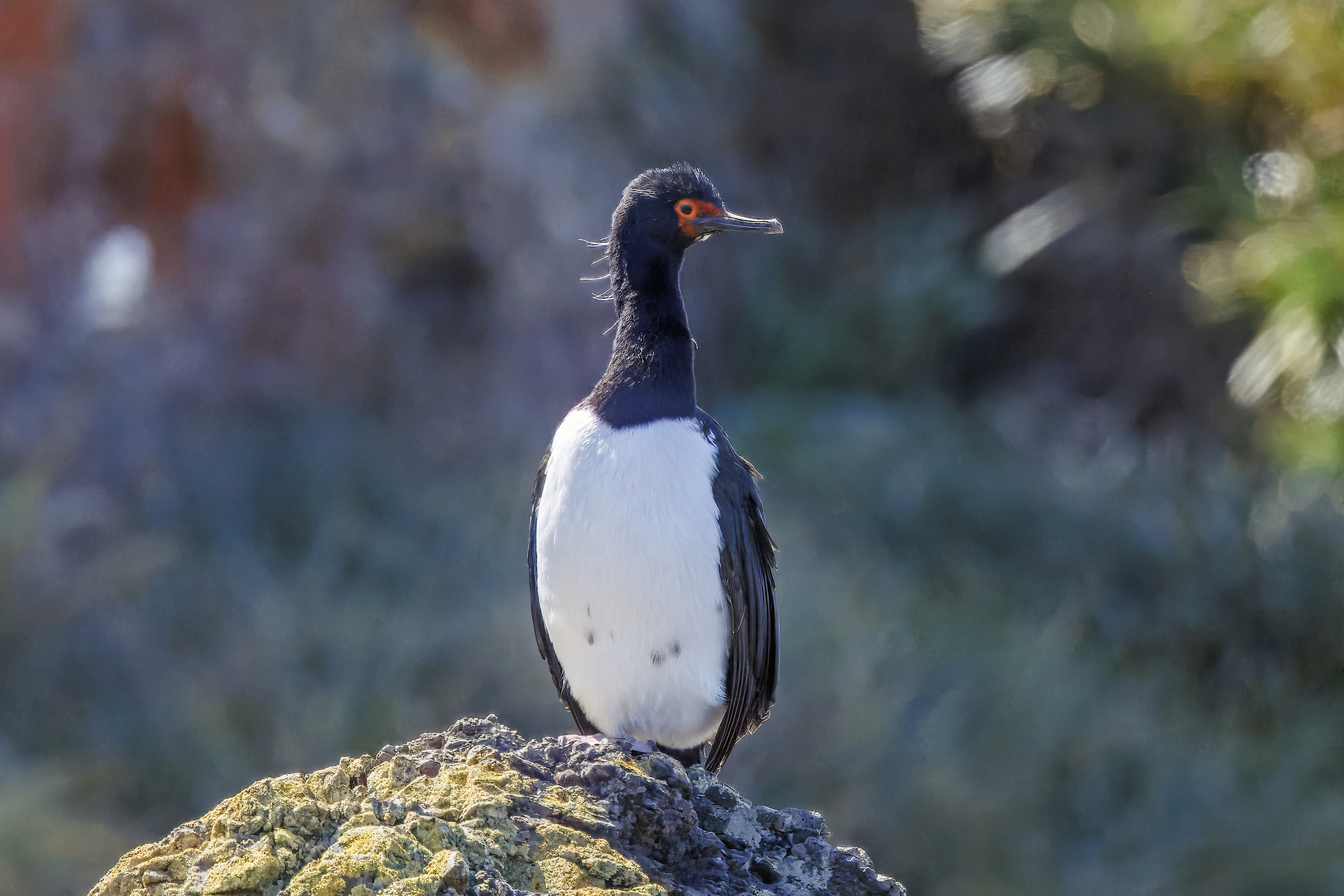

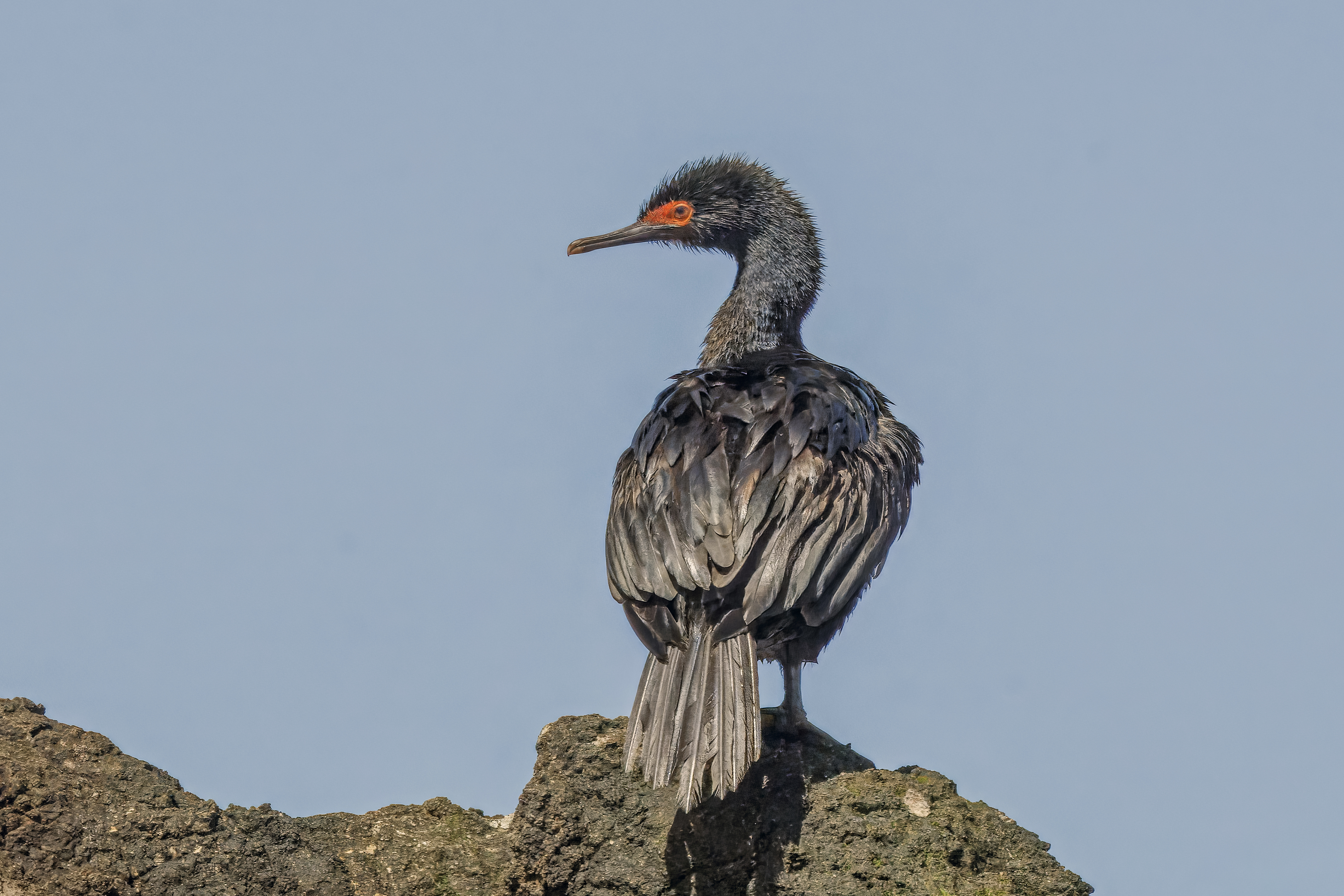
- Puñihuil, Ancud, Chiloé Island, Chile

Conservation status
- Least Concern (IUCN 3.1)

Scientific classification
- Kingdom: Animalia
- Phylum: Chordata
- Class: Aves
- Order: Suliformes
- Family: Phalacrocoracidae
- Genus: Leucocarbo
- Species: L. magellanicus

Binomial name
- Leucocarbo magellanicus (Gmelin, 1789)
- Nonbreeding Year-round

Synonyms
- Phalacrocorax magellanicus; Notocarbo magellanicus

= Rock shag =

Species of bird

The rock shag (Leucocarbo magellanicus), also known as the Magellanic cormorant, is a marine cormorant found around the southernmost coasts of South America. Its breeding range is from around Valdivia, Chile, south to Cape Horn and Tierra del Fuego, and north to Punta Tombo in Argentina. In winter it is seen further north, with individuals reaching as far as Santiago, Chile on the west coast and Uruguay on the east. The birds also breed around the coasts of the Falkland Islands.

== Taxonomy ==
The rock shag was formally described in 1789 by the German naturalist Johann Friedrich Gmelin in his revised and expanded edition of Carl Linnaeus's Systema Naturae. He placed it in the genus Pelecanus and coined the binomial name Pelecanus magellanicus. Gmelin based his description on the "Magellanic shag" that had been described in 1785 by the English ornithologist John Latham in his book A General Synopsis of Birds. Latham had in turn based his description on a specimen in the Leverian Museum and the account made by Georg Forster of his visit to Tierra del Fuego in December 1774 during James Cook's second voyage to the Pacific. The rock shag was formerly placed in the genus Phalacrocorax but based on the results of a molecular genetic study of the cormorants published in 2014, the species was moved to the genus Leucocarbo. The genus had been introduced in 1856 by the French naturalist Charles Lucien Bonaparte. The genus name combines the Ancient Greek leukos meaning "white" with the name Carbo introduced by Bernard Germain de Lacépède in 1799. The species is monotypic: no subspecies are recognised.

== Description ==
At a distance, the rock shag is a black and white bird, with head, neck and upperparts black and chest and underparts white. Closer up, the black areas vary from metallic blue to oily green, and are flecked with white in places. The legs and feet are a pink, fleshy colour, and the bare flesh around the beak and eyes is brick red. In breeding condition, there is a blackish though not very prominent crest on the forehead, and a distinctive white ear patch. There is even less sexual dimorphism than in most cormorant species, but males are 5%-10% larger on most size measurements.

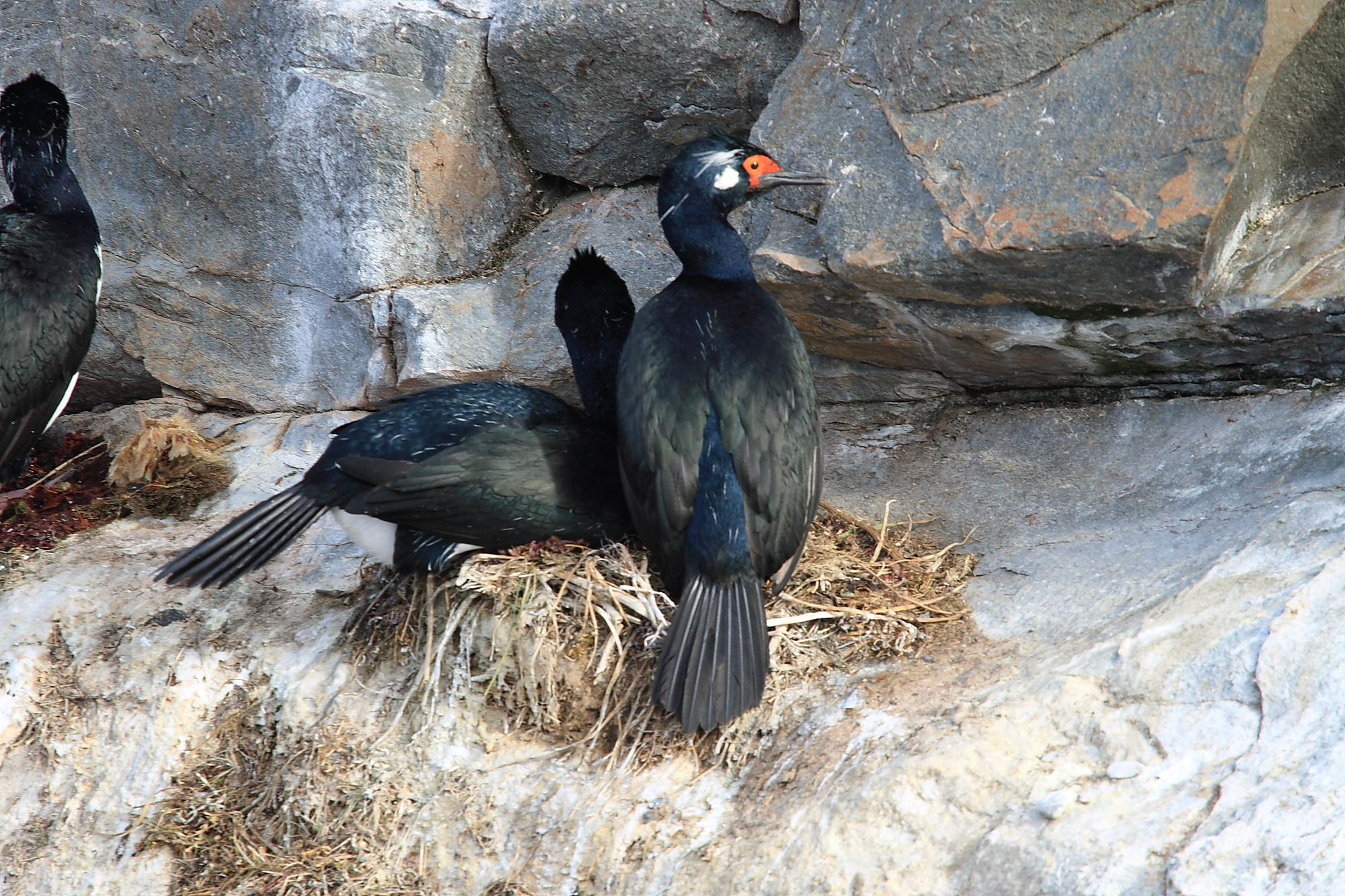
nesting; Beagle Channel, Tierra del Fuego, Argentina

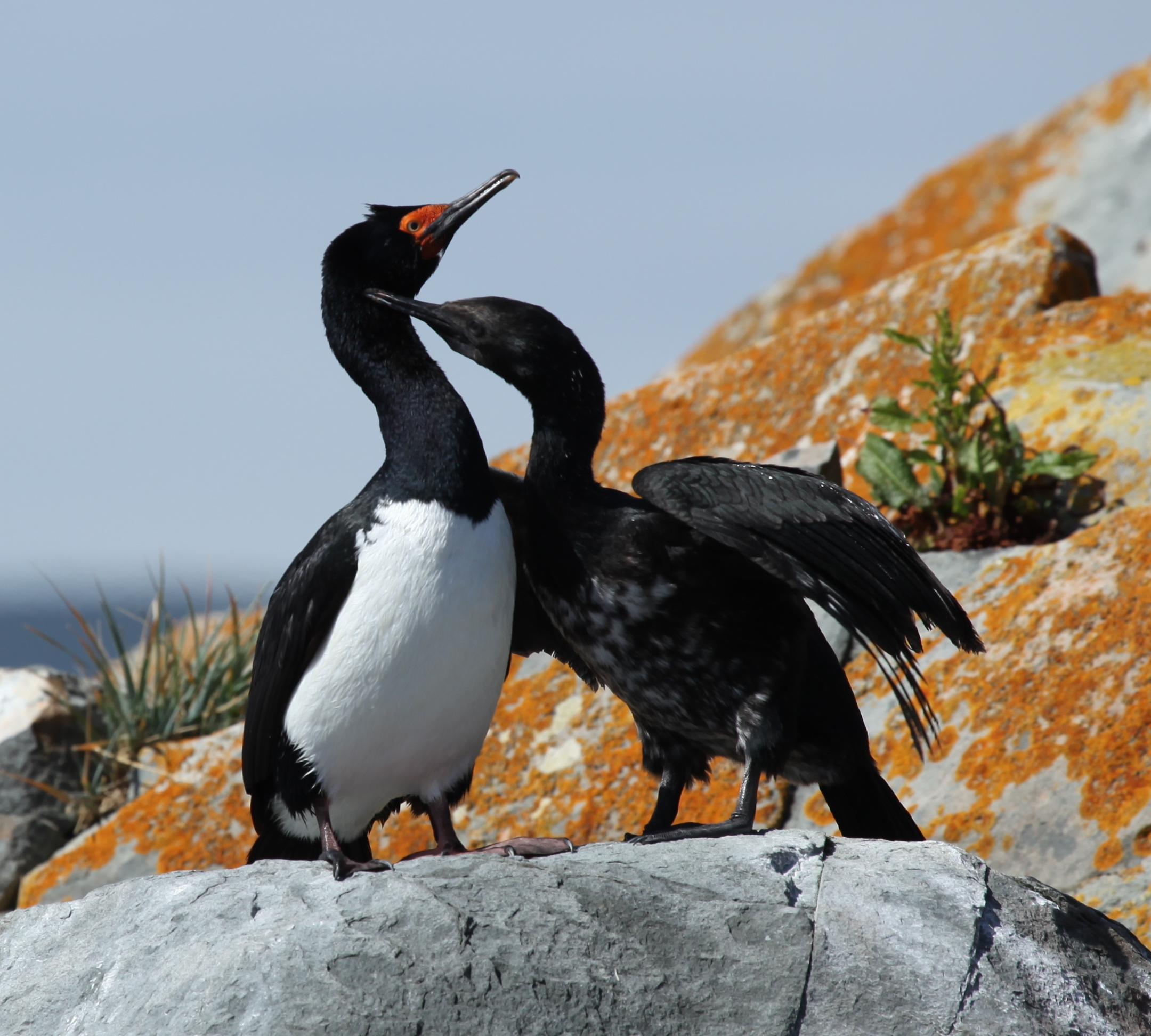
adult (left) with juvenile

== Behaviour and ecology ==
=== Food and feeding ===
Like all cormorants, the rock shag feeds by diving for underwater prey. It feeds close to shore, often diving at the edge of kelp beds and apparently finding small fish (predominantly cod icefishes, Patagonotothen species) sheltering among the weed. Studies with depth gauges suggest that it is a fairly shallow diver, typically going about 5 m below the surface with few individuals diving deeper than 10 m, although its prey mainly comes from the sea floor. Dive times are typically around 30 seconds. Its breeding range overlaps markedly with that of the imperial shag Leucocarbo atriceps, but the two species' foraging ranges are different since the imperial shag tends to dive in deeper water, further out from shore.

=== Breeding ===
The rock shag usually nests on ledges on steep, bare, rocky cliffs. It normally lays three eggs, though nests of from two to five eggs have been seen. Nesting colonies range in size from five pairs to nearly 400.
