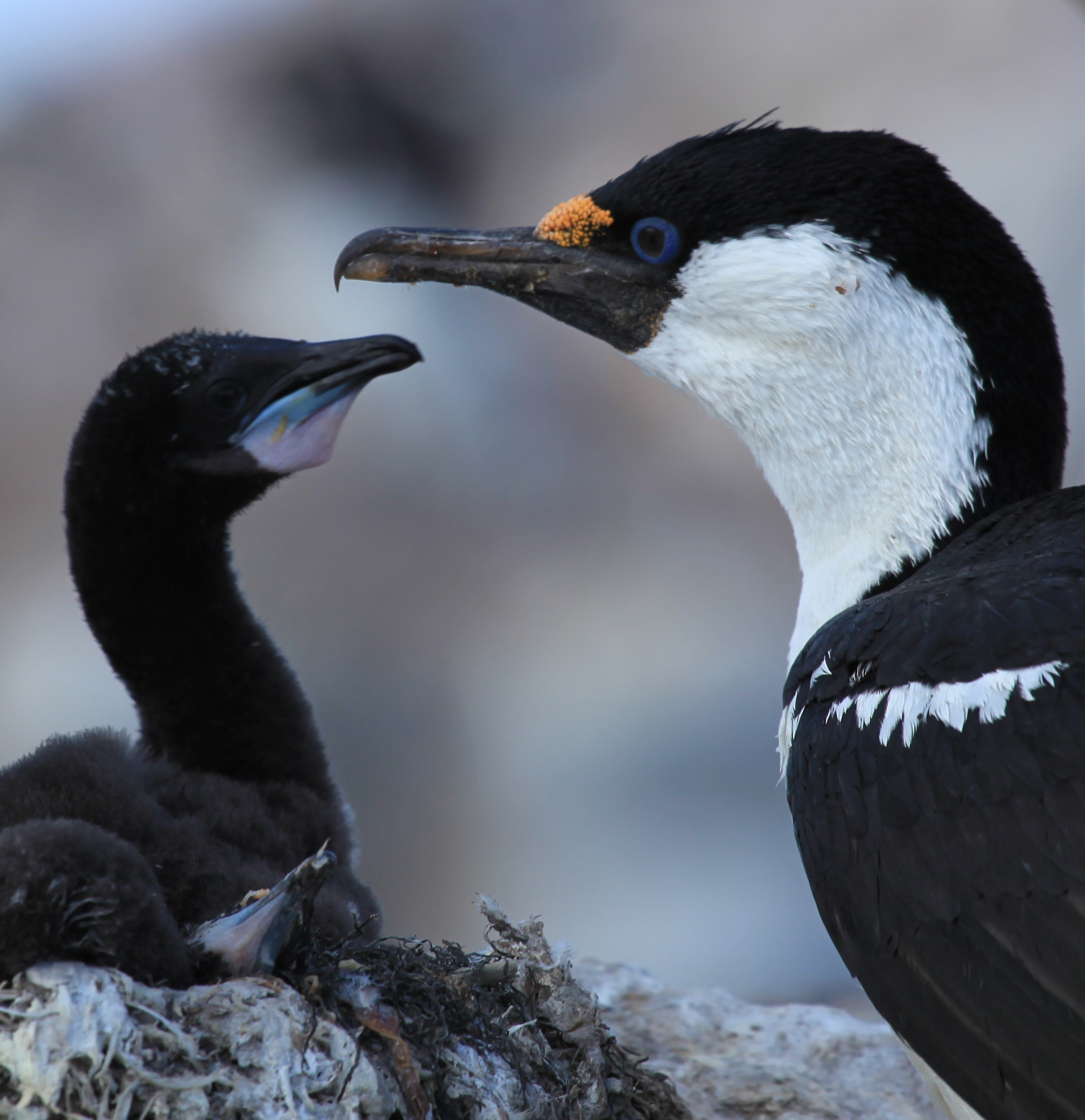

Scientific classification
- Kingdom: Animalia
- Phylum: Chordata
- Class: Aves
- Order: Suliformes
- Family: Phalacrocoracidae
- Genus: Leucocarbo
- Species: L. bransfieldensis

Binomial name
- Leucocarbo bransfieldensis (Murphy, 1936)

Synonyms
- Phalacrocorax atriceps bransfieldensis; Phalacrocorax bransfieldensis

= Antarctic shag =

Species of bird

The Antarctic shag (Leucocarbo bransfieldensis), sometimes referred to as the imperial cormorant, king cormorant, imperial shag, blue-eyed shag or Antarctic cormorant, is the only species of the cormorant family found in the Antarctic. It is sometimes considered conspecific with the Imperial shag (Leucocarbo atriceps).

== Description ==
The adult Antarctic shag is about 75–77 cm tall, has a wingspan of 124 cm, and weighs 1.5-3.5 kg. When looking at individuals within this species, the most defining characteristic is the warty yellow caruncle found on the forehead. Additionally, the blue "eye", which is actually blue skin surrounding the eye, is a distinct trait that stands out. The head, wings, and outside of the thighs are black. While the underparts and central back are white. White is also found on the wing bars that line the upper wing. The bill is dark ranging from brown to yellow. As the bill hooks, the lower mandible becomes lighter. The species has naked pink webbed feet and large black claws. The wings of this species are extremely strong and are powerful in flight with continuous wingbeats disrupted by some gliding. It is estimated that flight speed can reach 50 km per hour.

Juveniles are duller and browner than adults. They don't usually have the warty caruncle or white patch on their back.

Males and female look very similar but can be distinguished by size. Males are larger than females in size and are also larger-billed.

== Taxonomy ==
The Antarctic shag is part of the order Suliformes and the family Phalacrocoracidae, which includes all cormorants and shags. Still, there are some taxonomic issues regarding the species. The Antarctic shag is usually placed in genus Phalacrocorax or Leucocarbo. This species is one of the blue-eyed shags, however its position within the group is debated. Some scientists lump the Antarctic shag with other species, such as the imperial shag. However, the IOC World Bird List and the Clements Checklist consider the Antarctic shag to be its own species.

== Habitat and distribution ==
Currently, the Antarctic shag is found on the Antarctic Peninsula, South Shetland Islands, and Elephant Island.

The Antarctic shag is described as a marine species staying near the shores of coastal regions and some islands. Additionally, colonies are usually found near packed ice. During the breeding season, breeding colonies are found on cliffs, rocky slopes, outcrops and sometimes even flat coasts or islets.

This species is sedentary and doesn't migrate. However, a single Antarctic shag was found dead in Bahia, Brazil in 2002; it had previously been ringed in the South Shetland Islands. Colonies may move short distances to find waters that aren't frozen in order to feed. This short move most likely occurs during winter months when ice starts to spread and cover the ocean where the birds feed.

=== Population status ===
The current population of the Antarctic shag is stable, with an estimated 20,000 individuals worldwide. Currently there is no particular threat that could hurt the community or population size.

It is very hard to estimate the population of species in isolated areas, such as the Antarctic. Still, recent studies using Unmanned Aerial Vehicles (UAV) have allowed scientists to estimate Antarctic shag populations by taking images of colonies. Since this data is based on images, more can also be learned about topography, habitat selection and nesting. In the future, this might allow scientists to more precisely estimate population size.

In 2018, a study found that 3.5% of the global Antarctic shag population breeds in Ryder Bay. The study also calls for greater protections of the area.

== Behavior ==
=== Reproduction ===
Antarctic shags are monogamous and only mate with one partner each nesting season. Still, partners may change between seasons. Males attract breeding partners with a greeting display.

Typically, colonies breed on low rocky cliffs near the water. This species usually forms smaller colonies of 20–40 pairs, but larger colonies of up to 800 pairs have been observed.

Both genders build a nest from feathers, seaweed, and ocean debris. Materials are then connected with excreta, which is waste material, such as feces and urine. Shag mating pairs often steal nesting material from other couples. The final nest shape looks like a cone with the tip cut off, similar to a volcano. Nests are sometimes reused between years as many individuals return to the same breeding site.

Antarctic shags lay their eggs between October and December. The female lays 2 or 3 eggs on average; but up to 5 eggs have been observed. Both parents help incubate the eggs for 28–31 days. Chicks hatch without a protective down making them vulnerable to the Antarctic conditions. Due to this lack of protection, parents must keep their chicks warm for the first few weeks. The naked chicks are fed by their parents for about 3 weeks with the male partner providing most of the food. After about 3 weeks, the chicks start to fledge. By age 4, the offspring will have reached sexual maturity. The Antarctic shag has an estimated life expectancy of 15–20 years in the wild.

Breeding success can be directly affected by food availability and diving conditions.

=== Diet ===
The most common way to study the Antarctic shag's diet is by analyzing its pellets. Their pellets are often composed of bones, fur and feathers.

Antarctic shags usually forage alone or in small groups. Most of the Antarctic shag's diet is composed of fish, but can also include crustaceans, octopuses, snails, worms, slugs and other invertebrates. The fish diet is mostly composed of humphead notothen (Gobionotothen gibberifrons), gaudy notothen (Lepidonotothen nudifrons), bullhead notothen (Notothenia coriiceps), and Antarctic spiny plunderfish (Harpagifer antarcticus). Typically, the females consume more invertebrates while the males consume more fish. This difference in diet is most likely due to the difference in size of each gender.

=== Role in the food web ===
Antarctic shags are rarely prey for other species. There have been a few documented cases, including leopard seals and brown skuas killing Antarctic shags. However, other bird species prey on their eggs and chicks as well.

Unlike other birds, the Antarctic shag consumes demersal fish. In fact, this species can reach extreme depths when diving for their food. Since demersal fish are found on the ocean floor, these fish feed on other benthic species. Thus, the Antarctic shag links the benthic and pelagic zones of the food web. Despite linking these two areas of the ocean, the Antarctic shag has a limited population. Therefore, the amount of demersal species consumed doesn't impact the entire ecosystem.

=== Diving ===
On average, the Antarctic shag dives 25 meters to feed on fish. Their maximum dive depth is around 60 meters. The number of dives and depth of each dive is related to foraging conditions. They most likely ingest smaller fish and invertebrates while underwater. In contrast, larger fish, 15 cm or longer, are brought to land to eat.

Shags can't predict how much time is required to dive and capture prey. Once underwater, the bird looks for prey, and reacts based on the situation. If a fish is found but the shag doesn't have enough oxygen, it will come back up to the surface, take in the largest amount of air possible, and dive again to capture the prey. This shows that the Antarctic shag changes its diving strategy based on the situation.

Many birds can't fly with wet feathers and diving in the water can cause feathers to become waterlogged (fully saturated). Often, you see waterbirds standing with their wings spread to dry off their feathers after diving. Antarctic shags are unique in this respect and due to their dense inner plumage, this species doesn't need to dry off via wing-spreading like other diving bird species. These dense feathers close to the skin also prevent icy waters from hitting the skin. Additionally, birds having to spread their wings to dry could have further reduced their body temperature in an already extremely harsh climate. Therefore, both the cold water and cold air could have caused this species to develop over time.

=== Vocalization ===
Shags are known to be quiet but often vocalize at breeding sites or when vulnerable. When threatened, the male makes a "aaark" call while the female will make a hissing call. In contrast, during breeding, males makes a "honk" call.
