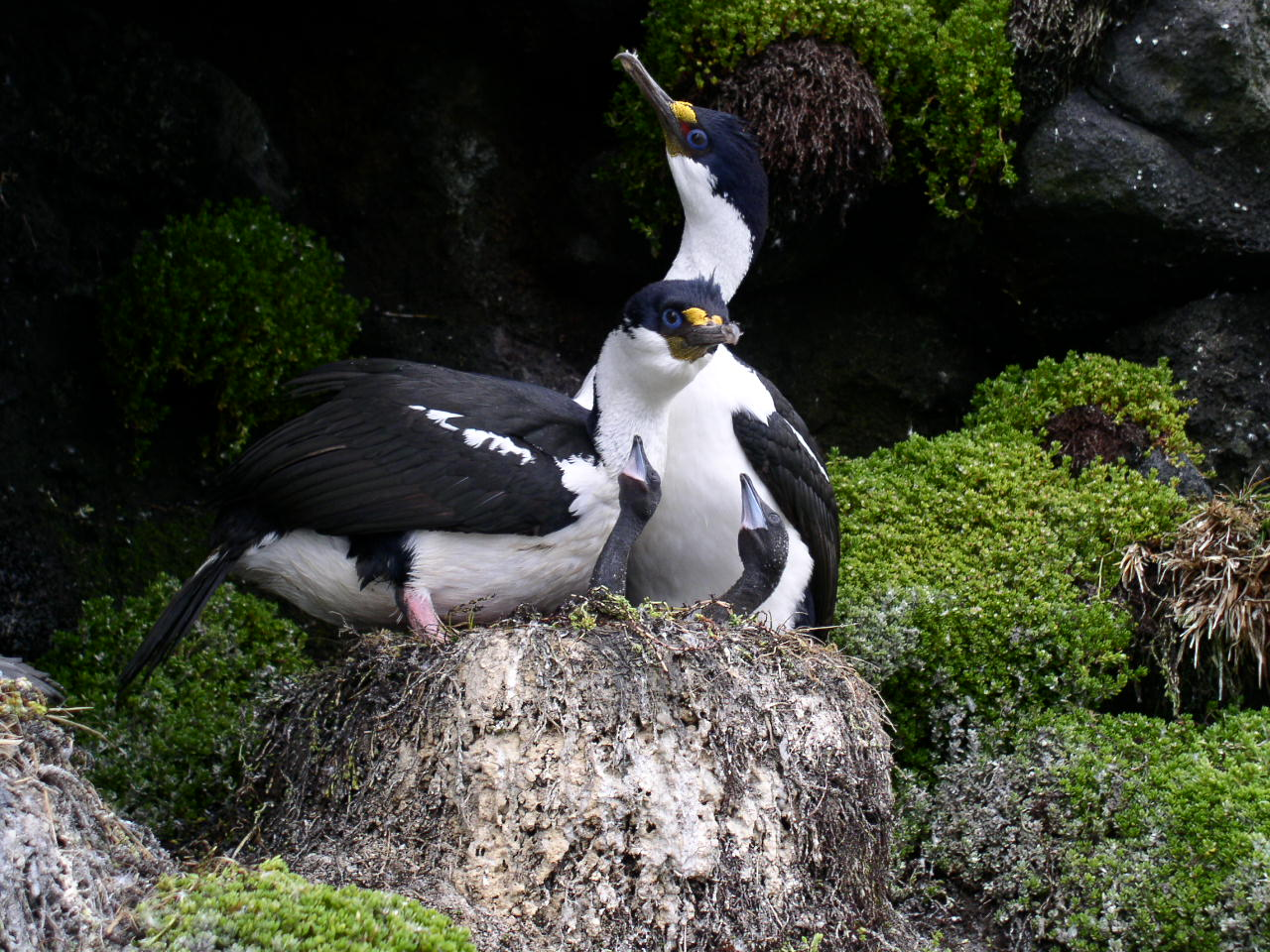

Scientific classification
- Domain: Eukaryota
- Kingdom: Animalia
- Phylum: Chordata
- Class: Aves
- Order: Suliformes
- Family: Phalacrocoracidae
- Genus: Leucocarbo
- Species: L. melanogenis

Binomial name
- Leucocarbo melanogenis (Blyth, 1860)

Synonyms
- Leucocarbo atriceps melanogenis; Phalacrocorax melanogenis

= Crozet shag =

Species of bird

The Crozet shag (Leucocarbo melanogenis), also known as the South Georgia cormorant, is a marine cormorant native to the Crozet, Prince Edward and Marion islands in the South Atlantic Ocean.

== Characteristics ==
The Crozet shag is a member of the blue-eyed shags group. It has slightly different plumage from other members of its group and occupies a highly specific range, which is why it is recognized as its own species. The breeding plumage of the Crozet shag features black upperparts with green to bluish sheen on the upper wing-coverts. The head, face and neck are black with a slight white coloration below the ears. They possess an average wingspan of 125 cm (49 in) and body length of 70 cm (28 in) with the males of the species being slightly larger overall.

== Taxonomy and distribution ==
The bird was first described by Edward Blythe in 1860. The name comes from the Crozet Islands, which falls within the habitat of the bird.

The Crozet shag is normally included as a member of the blue-eyed shags. Mitochondrial DNA analysis has shown that the distinction between shags and cormorants, which was used to sort the Crozet shag as a member of the genera Leucocarbo, is not clearly defined. Therefore, the shag is currently conservatively listed as a member of the genus Phalacrocorax, a combination of shags and cormorants into a single genus. It is often treated as a full species, despite limited study into the differences between the genera.

== Habitat ==
The Crozet shag is an island faring bird that is located primarily in the southern Atlantic and Indian Oceans in the region of sub-Antarctica. Common sightings of the Crozet shag occur on and around Prince Edward Island, Marion Island, and its native Crozet Island. These islands provide the shags with cliff tops and headlands from which to breed effectively and avoid strong coastal winds that have potential to disrupt and destroy potential nests. The Crozet shag is also able to maintain a wide-ranging diet of squid, octopus, molluscs, crustaceans and fish as a result of its heavily aquatic environment.

== Behavior ==
The Crozet shag forages for food during the daytime in the benthic zone of the ocean. Female members of the species have been recorded as diving to a shallower depth than males, who can reach depths of about 50 m (160 ft) below the surface. This example of sexual dimorphism has been theorized to be because female shags will go after smaller prey than males. To make up for this, females are recorded as diving on average an hour more per day than their male counterparts.

Crozet shags are a diving bird in the cold polar waters, but they have little blubber and wettable feathers compared to penguins. Their dives are therefore much shorter, usually around one or two minutes. Crozet shags use a lot of energy for these dives because they are easily impacted by the cold ocean waters.
