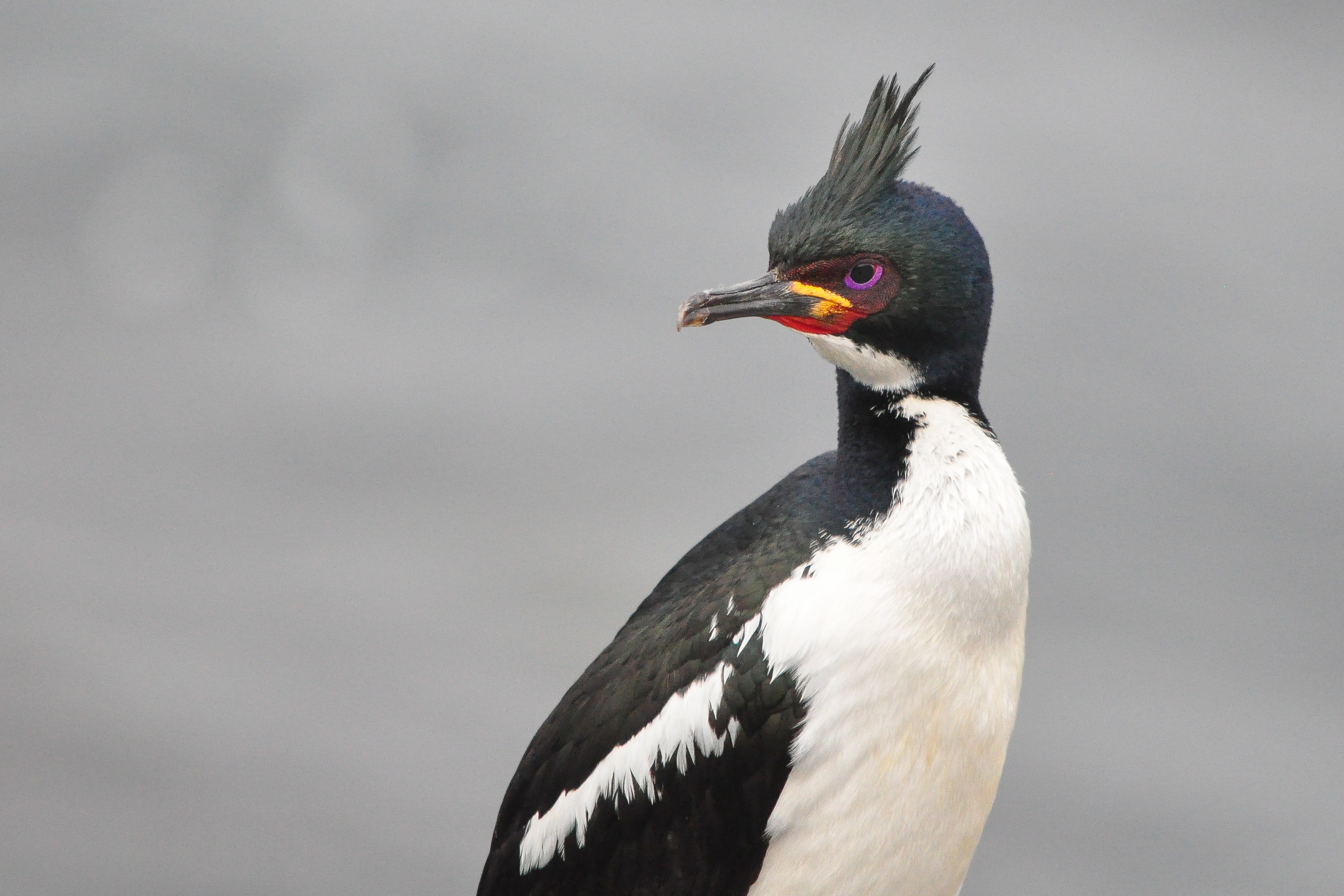

Conservation status
- Vulnerable (IUCN 3.1)

Scientific classification
- Kingdom: Animalia
- Phylum: Chordata
- Class: Aves
- Order: Suliformes
- Family: Phalacrocoracidae
- Genus: Leucocarbo
- Species: L. colensoi

Binomial name
- Leucocarbo colensoi (Buller, 1888)
- Native range

Synonyms
- Phalacrocorax colensoi

= Auckland shag =

Species of bird

The Auckland shag or Auckland Islands shag (Leucocarbo colensoi) is a species of cormorant from New Zealand. The species is endemic to the Auckland Islands archipelago. It is a sedentary bird that primarily eats various crustaceans and fish. In recent years, roughly 1,000 pairs have been recorded. The Auckland shag is a colonial nester, building sizeable nests of, among other items, grass, twigs and seaweed. The Auckland shag lays three pale blue-green eggs in November–February. The incubation period is 26–32 days.

The Auckland shag is considered Vulnerable by the IUCN due to its small population size and restricted global range.

Some taxonomic authorities, including the International Ornithologists' Union, place this species in the genus Leucocarbo. Others place it in the genus Phalacrocorax.

The specific epithet of this bird commemorates the naturalist William Colenso.
