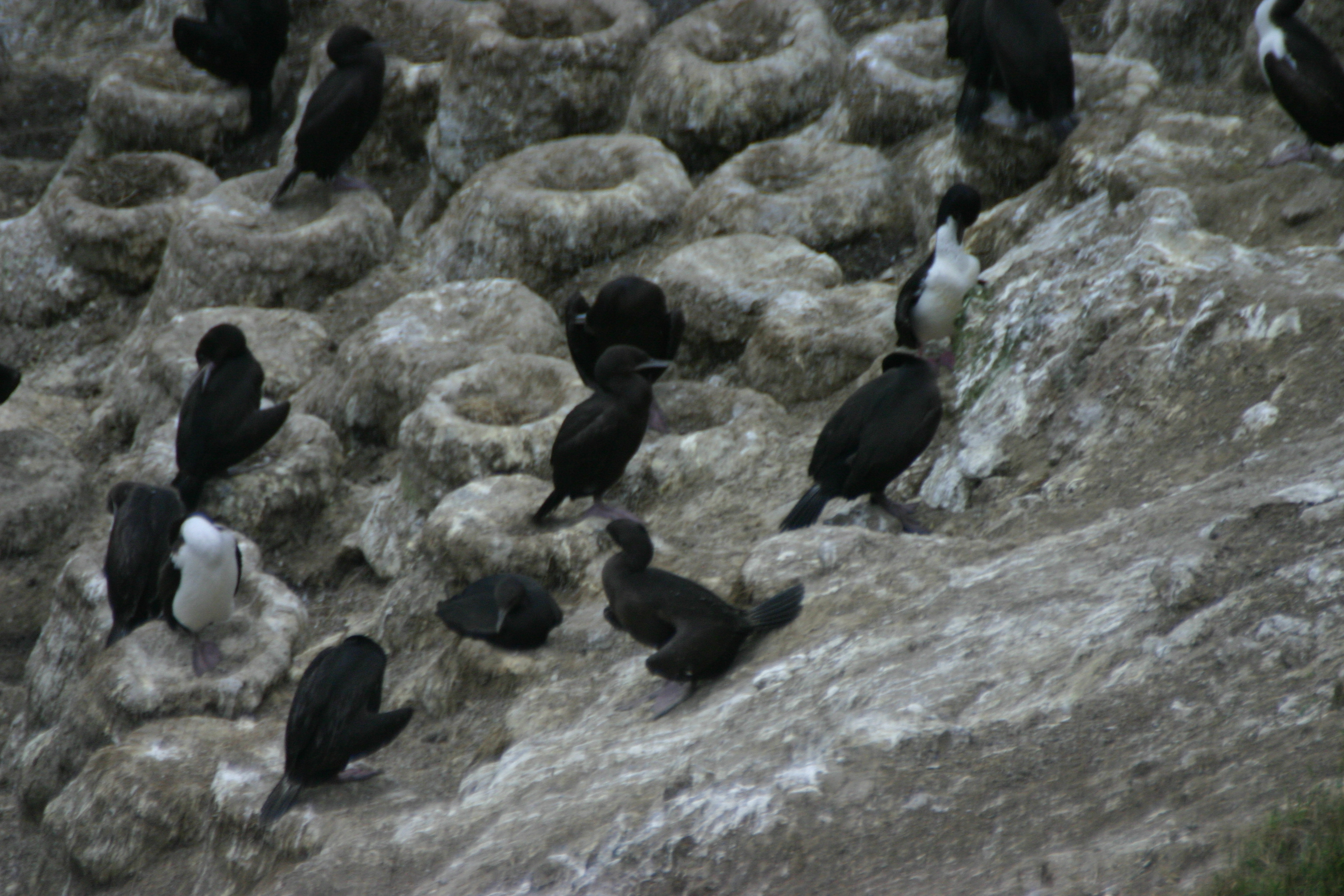

Conservation status
- Vulnerable (IUCN 3.1)

Scientific classification
- Kingdom: Animalia
- Phylum: Chordata
- Class: Aves
- Order: Suliformes
- Family: Phalacrocoracidae
- Genus: Leucocarbo
- Species: L. chalconotus

Binomial name
- Leucocarbo chalconotus (Gray, 1845)

Synonyms
- Phalacrocorax chalconotus

= Stewart Island shag =

Species of bird

The Stewart Island shag (Leucocarbo chalconotus; Māori: matapo) is a species of shag found on New Zealand's South Island and Stewart Island. The Stewart Island shag has sometimes been split into two species, the Foveaux shag and the Otago shag.

== Taxonomy ==
The Stewart Island shag was formally described and illustrated in 1845 by the English zoologist George Gray based on a specimen collected by Percy Earl in the Otago region of New Zealand's South Island. Gray placed the new species in the genus Gracalus and coined the binomial name Gracalus chalconotus. The specific epithet is from Ancient Greek χαλκονωτος/khalkonōtos meaning "bronze-backed". The Stewart Island shag is now one of the 15 shags placed in the genus Leucocarbo, which was introduced in 1856 by the French naturalist Charles Lucien Bonaparte.

Two subspecies are recognised:

- L. c. chalconotus (Gray, GR, 1845) – east South Island (New Zealand)
- L. c. stewarti (Ogilvie-Grant, 1898) – south South Island and Stewart Island (New Zealand)

The Stewart Island shag has sometimes been split into two species with the subspecies L. c. chalconotus known as the Otago shag and the subspecies L. c. stewarti known as the Foveaux shag. The species was split based on a molecular phylogenetic study published in 2016 but were then re-lumped when a later study by some of the same ornithologists found that the two species were separated by only a shallow genetic divergence.

== Description ==
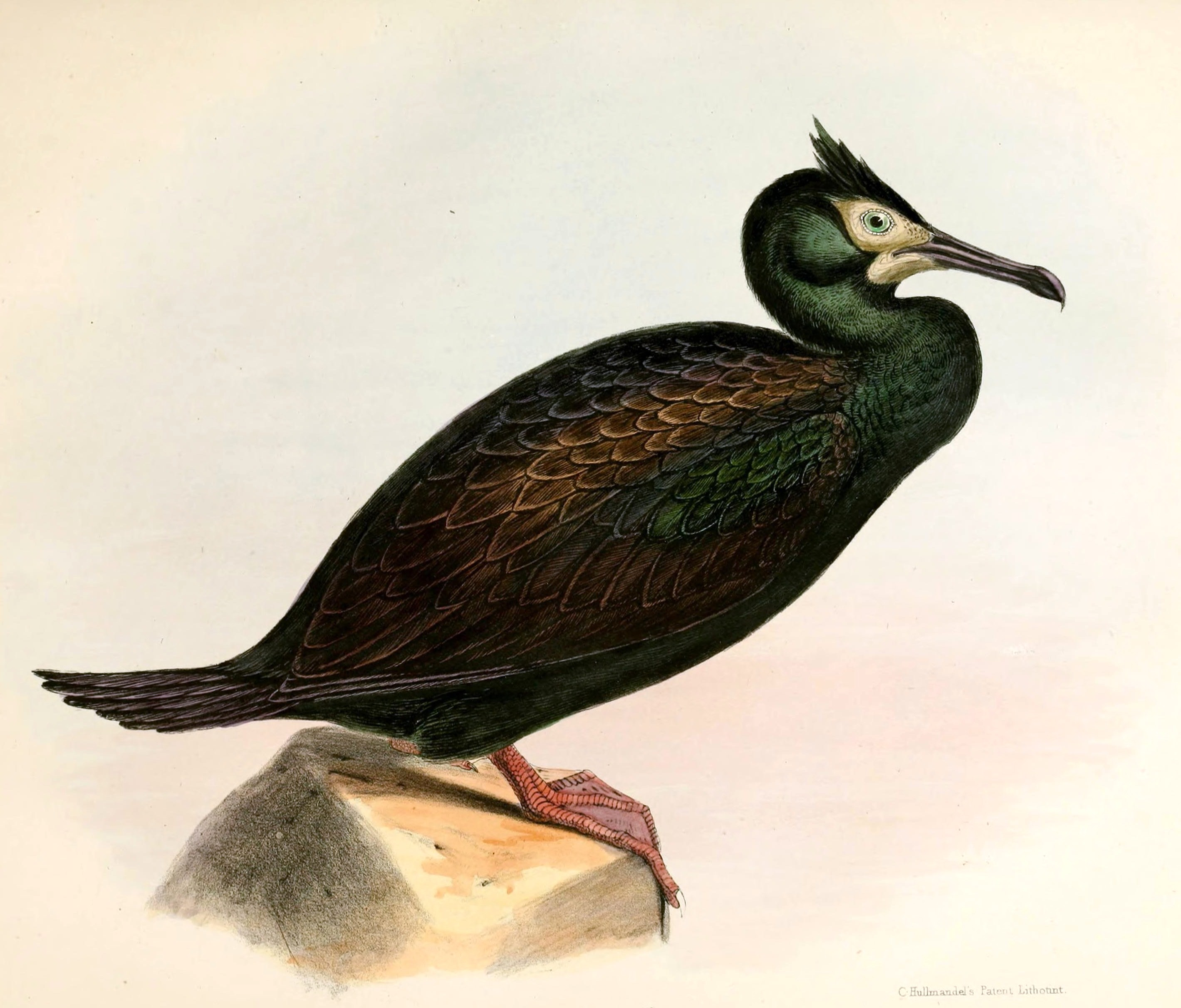
An 1845 lithograph by Charles Hullmandel of the bronze phase

The species is dimorphic, with two plumages. Roughly one quarter of the individuals are pied, with dark and white feathers, and the rest, known as bronze shags, are dark all over. Both morphs breed together. These large, chunky birds are about 70 cm long and weigh about 2–3 kg.

Stewart Island shags vary in their facial ornamentation in the breeding season. Roughly half of breeding individuals have dark orange papillae on their face, while the other half have small bright orange caruncles above the base of the bill instead. Gular pouch colour in the breeding season also varies, from bright orange to dark orange to purple.

== Distribution and conservation ==
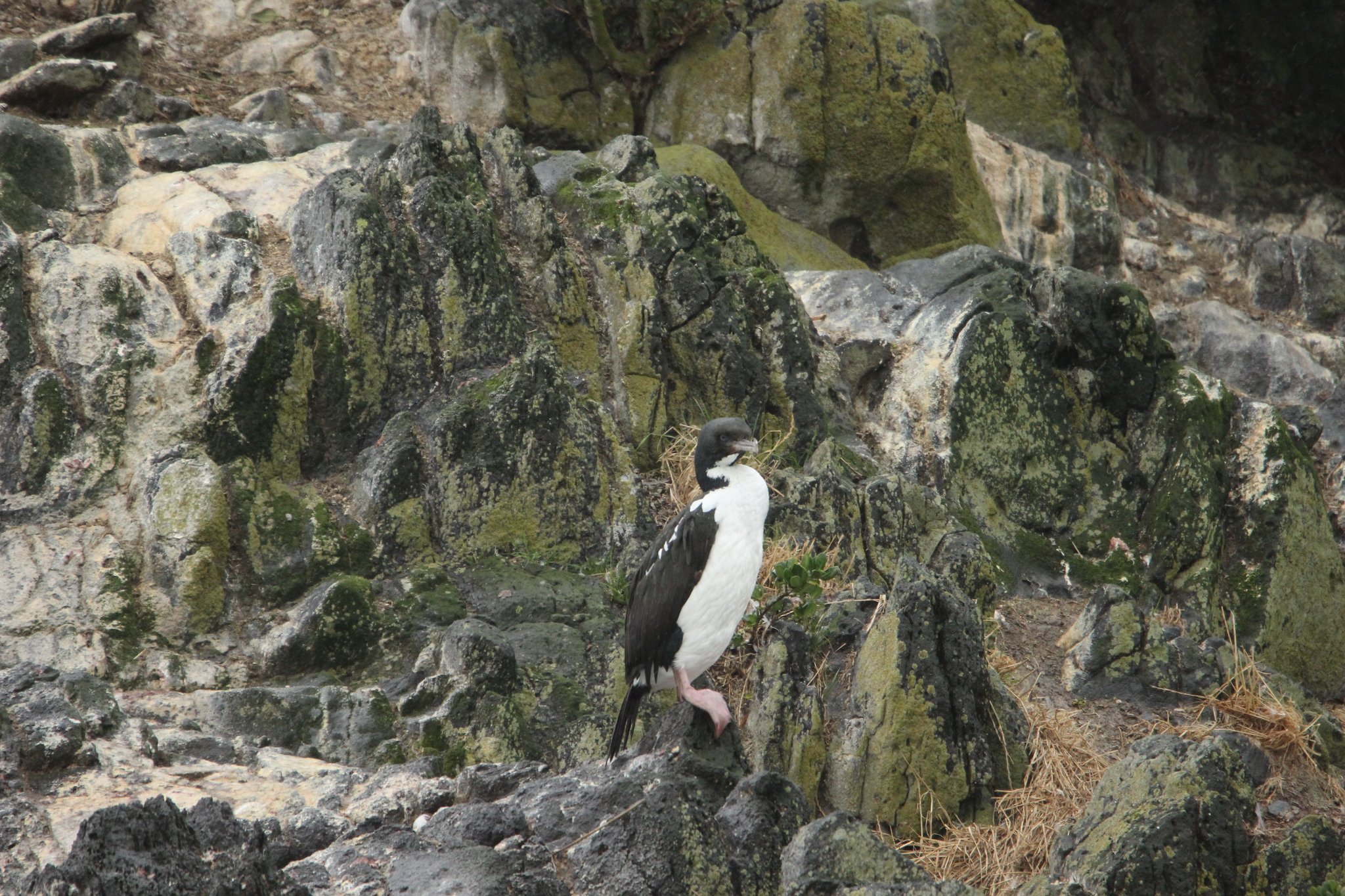
An Otago shag in Otago

Archaeological evidence shows that Stewart Island shags were formerly found along the entire east coast of the South Island up to Marlborough, but when humans arrived the population was devastated, reduced by 99 percent within 100 years with a corresponding loss of genetic diversity. It became restricted to the rocky offshore islets off the Otago Peninsula, and has scarcely recovered since that time. There are less than 2500 Otago shags remaining, but they can be seen at Otago Harbour, as far north as Oamaru, and as far south as the Catlins. Restricted to a small area, and having little or no genetic variation, they require conservation efforts tailored to these extinction risk factors; this could include reintroduction to part of their former range.

Stewart Island shags breed colonially from May to September, making raised cup nests out of organic material and guano on islands and sea cliffs. Colonies are large enough to be strikingly visible, and are used year after year. One notable colony is on the northern shore of Taiaroa Head, at the mouth of the Otago Harbour. They feed in coastal waters less than 30 m deep and are rarely if ever seen inland or far out to sea.
