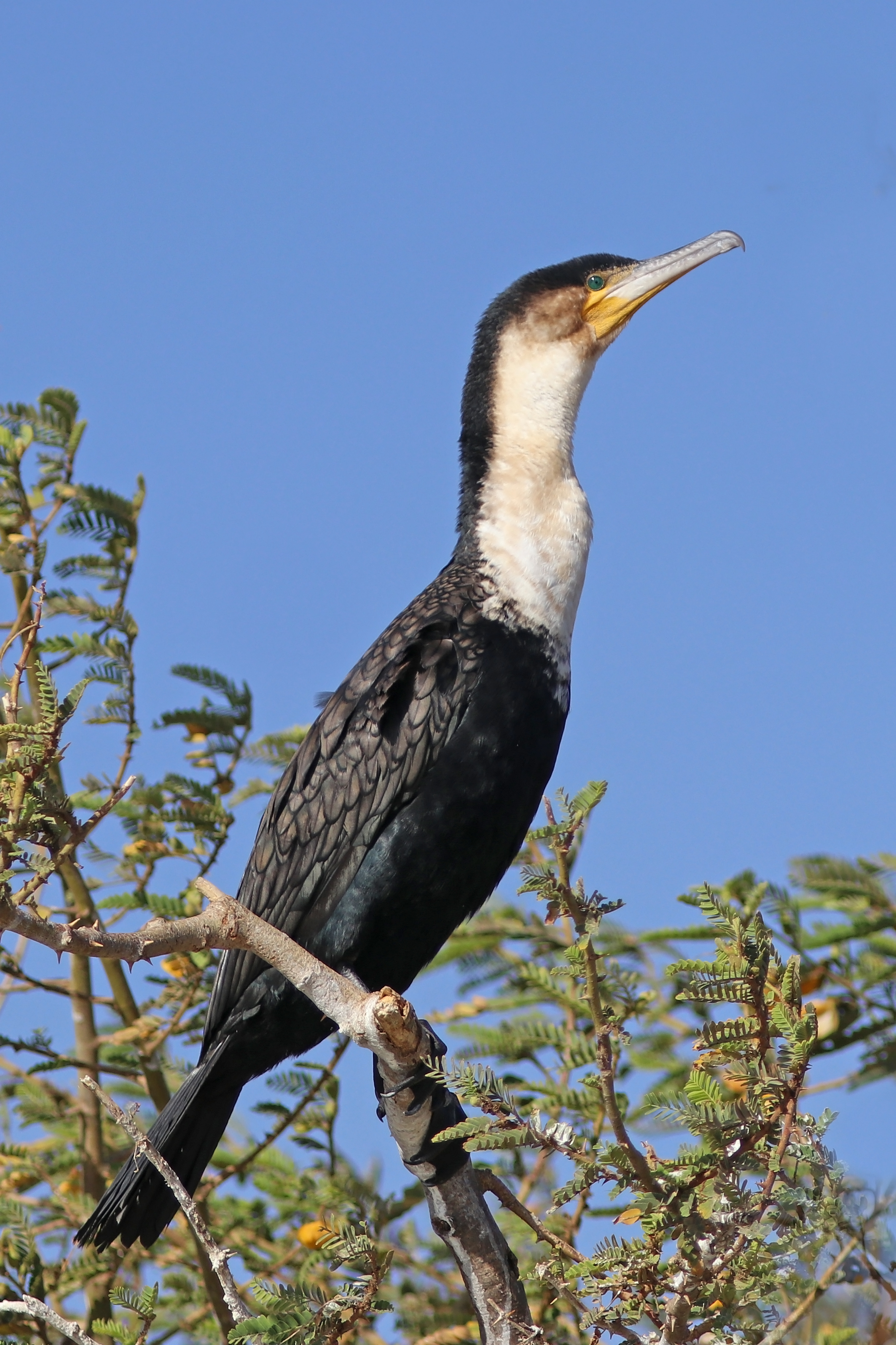
- Lake Ziway, Ethiopia

Scientific classification
- Kingdom: Animalia
- Phylum: Chordata
- Class: Aves
- Order: Suliformes
- Family: Phalacrocoracidae
- Genus: Phalacrocorax
- Species: P. carbo
- Subspecies: P. c. lucidus

Trinomial name
- Phalacrocorax carbo lucidus (Lichtenstein, MHC, 1823)
- Range, excluding isolated northern and western populations breeding range non-breeding range

Synonyms
- Phalacrocorax carbo lucidus

= White-breasted cormorant =

Subspecies of bird

The white-breasted cormorant (Phalacrocorax carbo lucidus) is a subspecies of the widely distributed great cormorant, formerly often considered to be a separate species. Its distinguishing features include a white breast and a preference for freshwater habitats among its subpopulations. The species should not be confused with the smaller and morphologically distinct endemic South Australian black-faced cormorant, which occasionally shares the common name "white-breasted cormorant".

== Taxonomy ==
Phalacrocorax carbo lucidus is a subspecies of the great cormorant and a member of the cormorant family Phalacrocoracidae. Its taxonomic status was formerly uncertain but genetic evidence has shown that it is embedded within P. carbo. A black-necked form originally classified as Phalacrocorax patricki or Phalacrocorax carbo patricki is now regarded as synonymous with P. c. lucidus.

== Description ==
As its name suggests, the 80-to-100 cm-long (31-to-39 in) white-breasted cormorant has a white neck and breast when adult, and the white area tends to increase as the bird becomes more mature, though juveniles have more extensive pale mottling down to the belly. In other respects it is a large cormorant generally resembling the great cormorant.

== Distribution ==
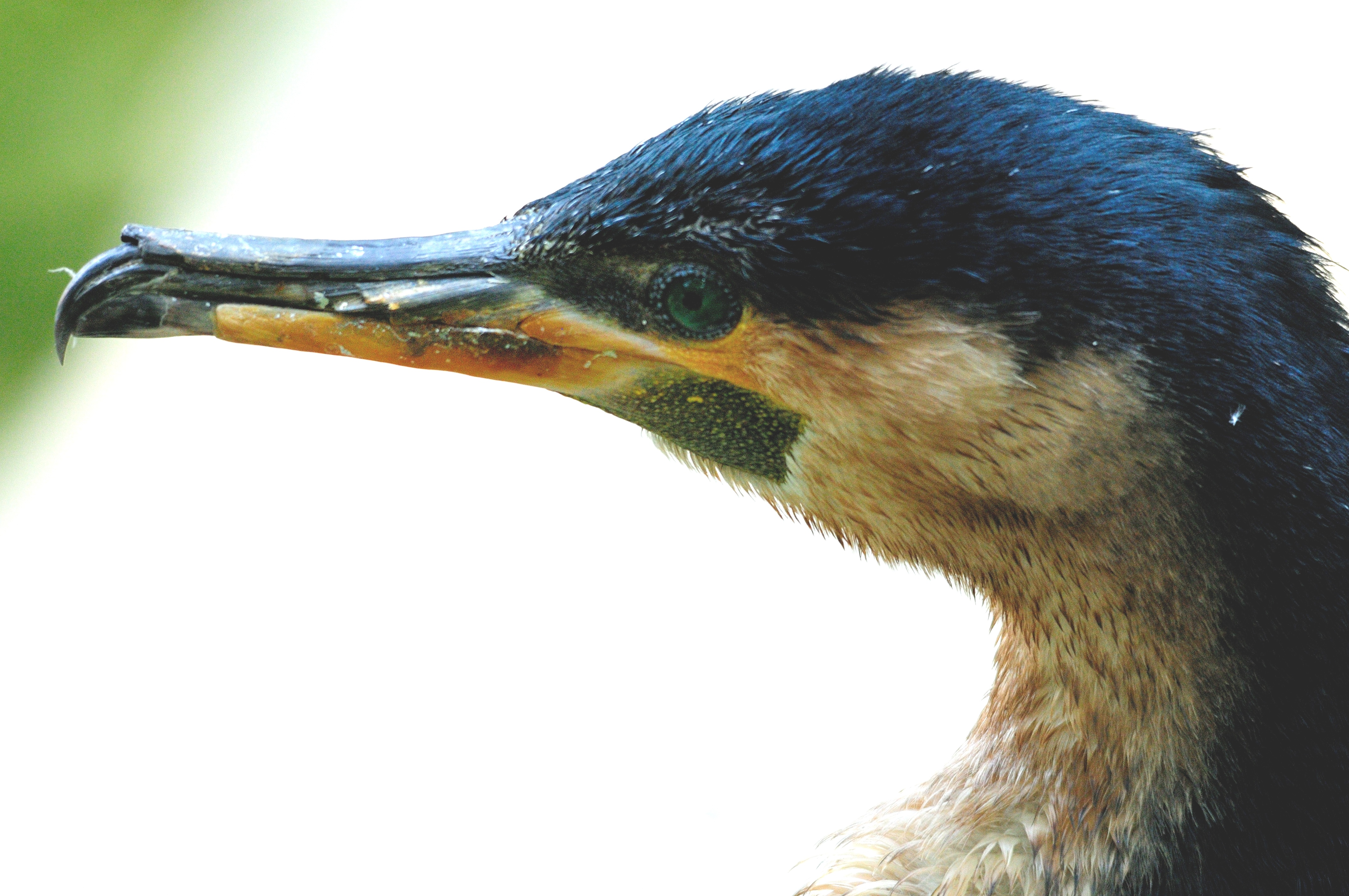
Dark gular skin is evident when breeding starts

The white-breasted cormorant is the only form of great cormorant found in Sub-Saharan Africa, the only form that has strictly freshwater populations, and the only form with a white breast and throat. It does however intergrade with the great cormorant subspecies P. carbo maroccanus in western Africa, which is distinguished only with difficulty by its reduced white on the breast. The West African population predominantly inhabits the Sahelian Upwelling Marine Ecoregion, stretching from Morocco to Guinea along the Atlantic coast, and its breeding grounds extend from the Cape Verde Islands to the coastline. In 2006, it was estimated that this population comprised approximately 35,000 individuals, according to data from Wetlands International. The species has important nesting sites in Djoudj National Park in Senegal. It also interbreeds freely with dark-breasted forms in central Africa.

It can be found from Angola to the Cape of Good Hope and northwards on the east coast to Mozambique and occurs around the entire Southern African coastline, but it is not clear whether the coastal populations are separate from the inland populations. On the African mainland it occurs more frequently in eastern and southern parts, rather than in the drier western regions, where it usually is found only on perennial rivers and dams. On inland waters it commonly occurs together with the reed cormorant and the African darter, but it is ecologically separated from these species by its fishing habits and the size and nature of its prey. There are also inland populations in Nigeria and around Lake Chad, and in eastern and southern Africa from Sudan southwards. It can be found around the Red Sea, where it is sometimes referred to as the Red Sea white-breasted cormorant.

== Diet ==
White-breasted cormorants are opportunistic feeders in fish-rich marine environments.

A 2012 study on West African populations revealed significant dietary variations across different sites, with a few dominant fish species in each location. The majority of prey fish were coastal species, some capable of entering brackish and fresh waters. Predominantly, the consumed fish were benthic or bentho-pelagic, ranging from 10 to 20 cm in size. These findings indicate the species' capacity to adapt to fluctuations in fish availability across environments.

== Gallery ==
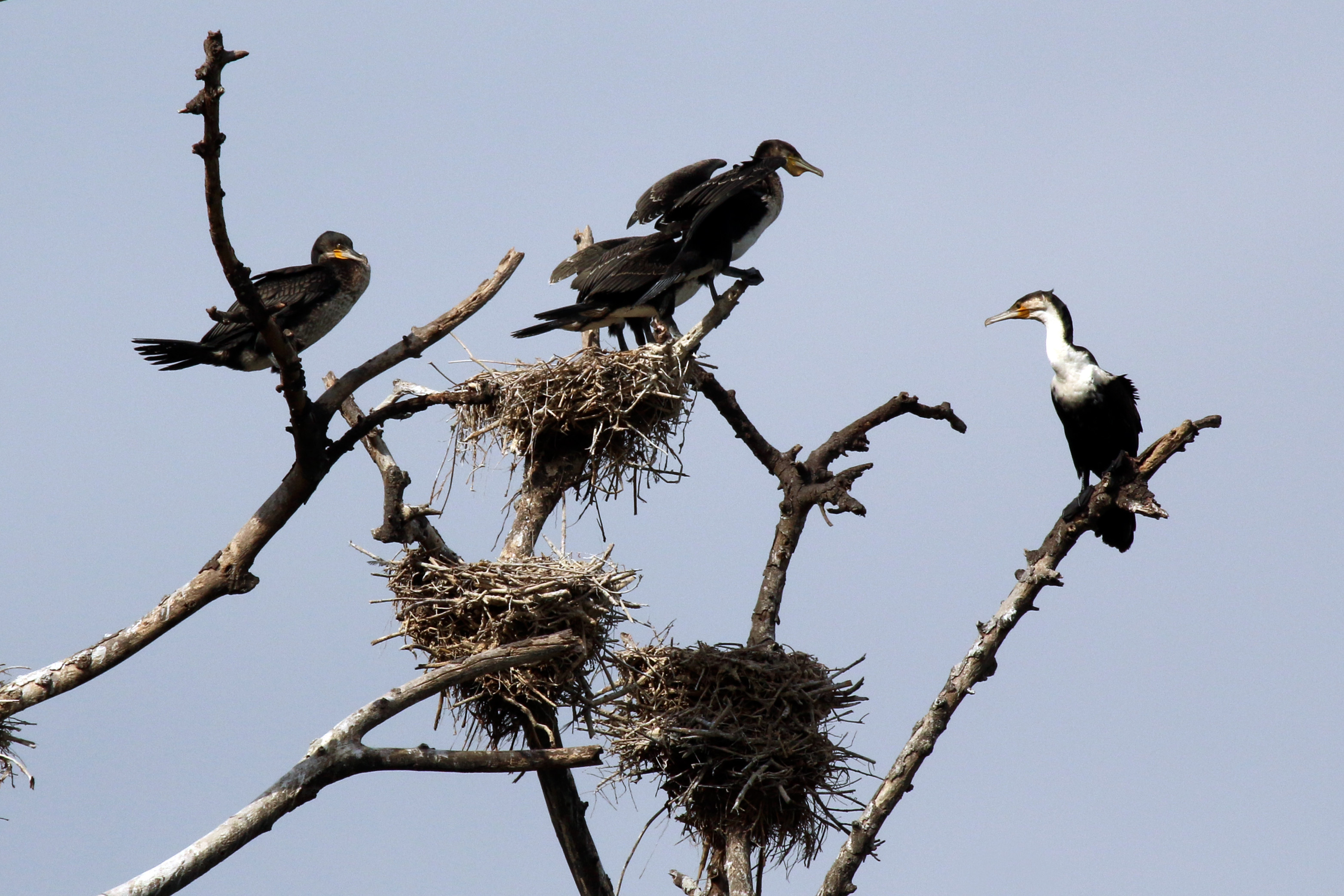
A nesting colony in iSimangaliso Wetland Park, South Africa

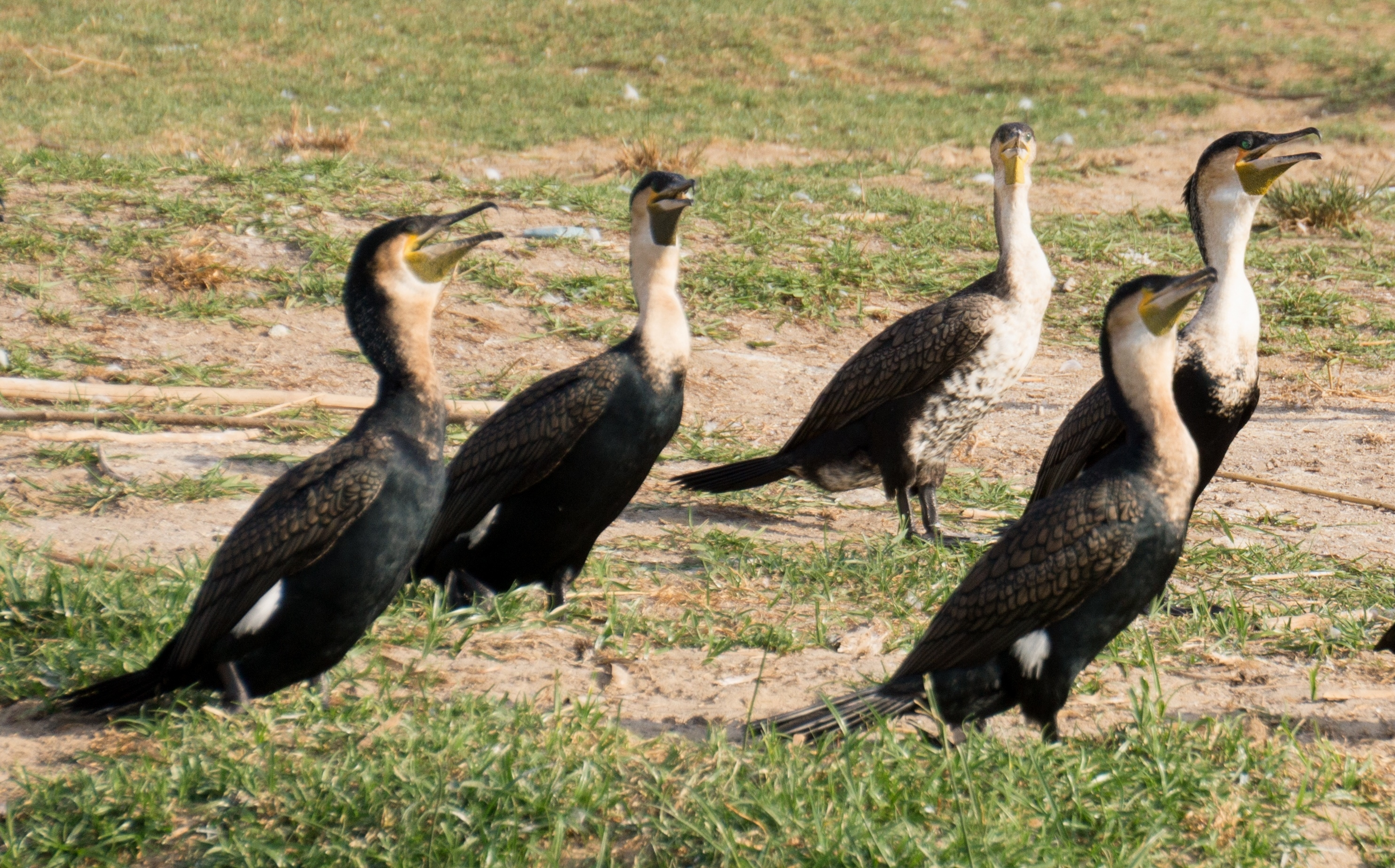
Breeding adults, distinguishable by their white flank spots, and a juvenile (centre), with more extensive mottled pale belly but no flank spot, at Lake Edward, Uganda

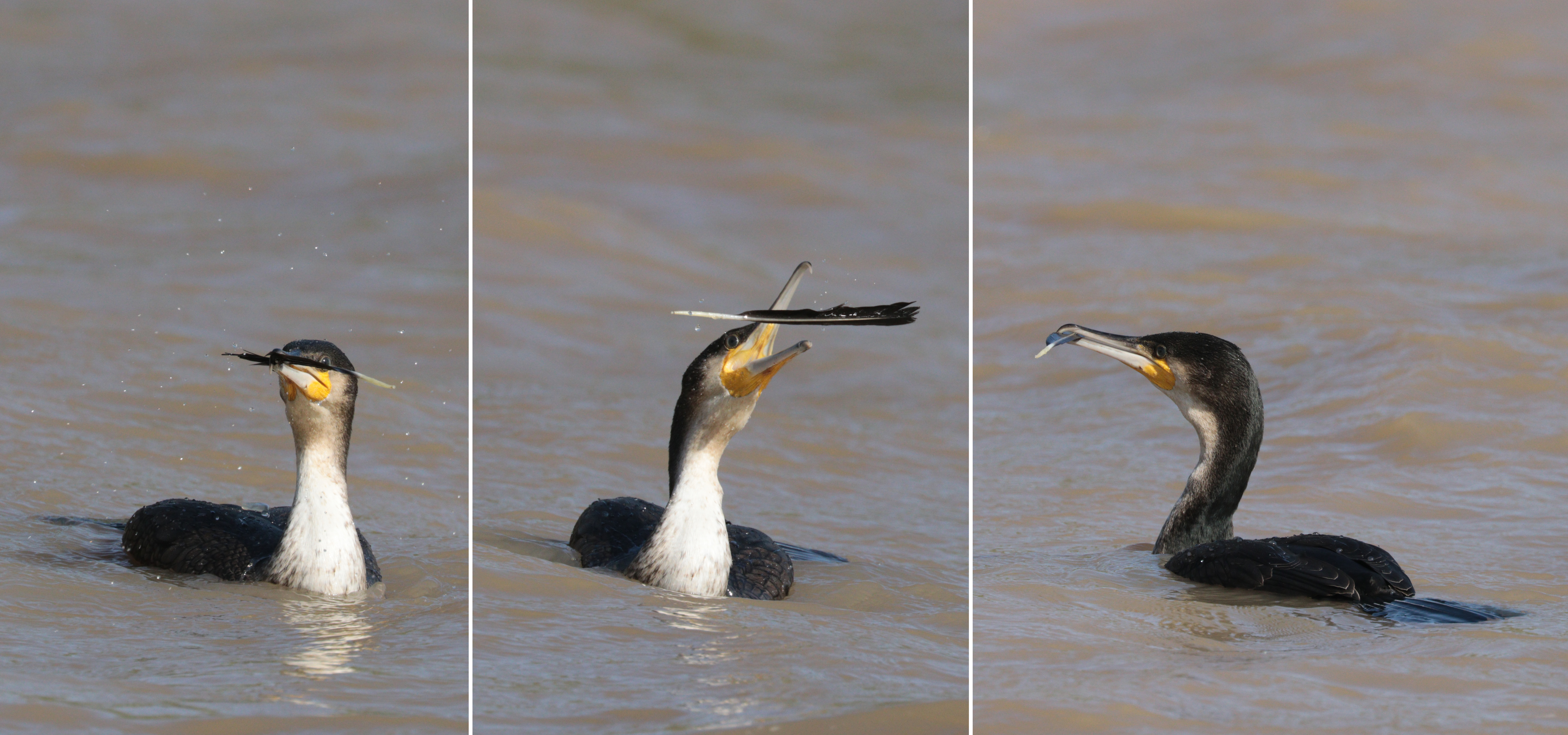
playing with feather, Ethiopia

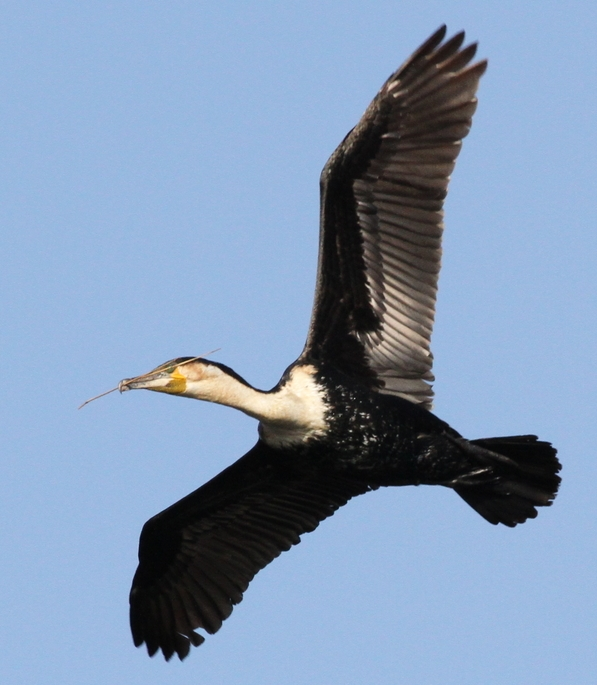
In flight, carrying nesting material
