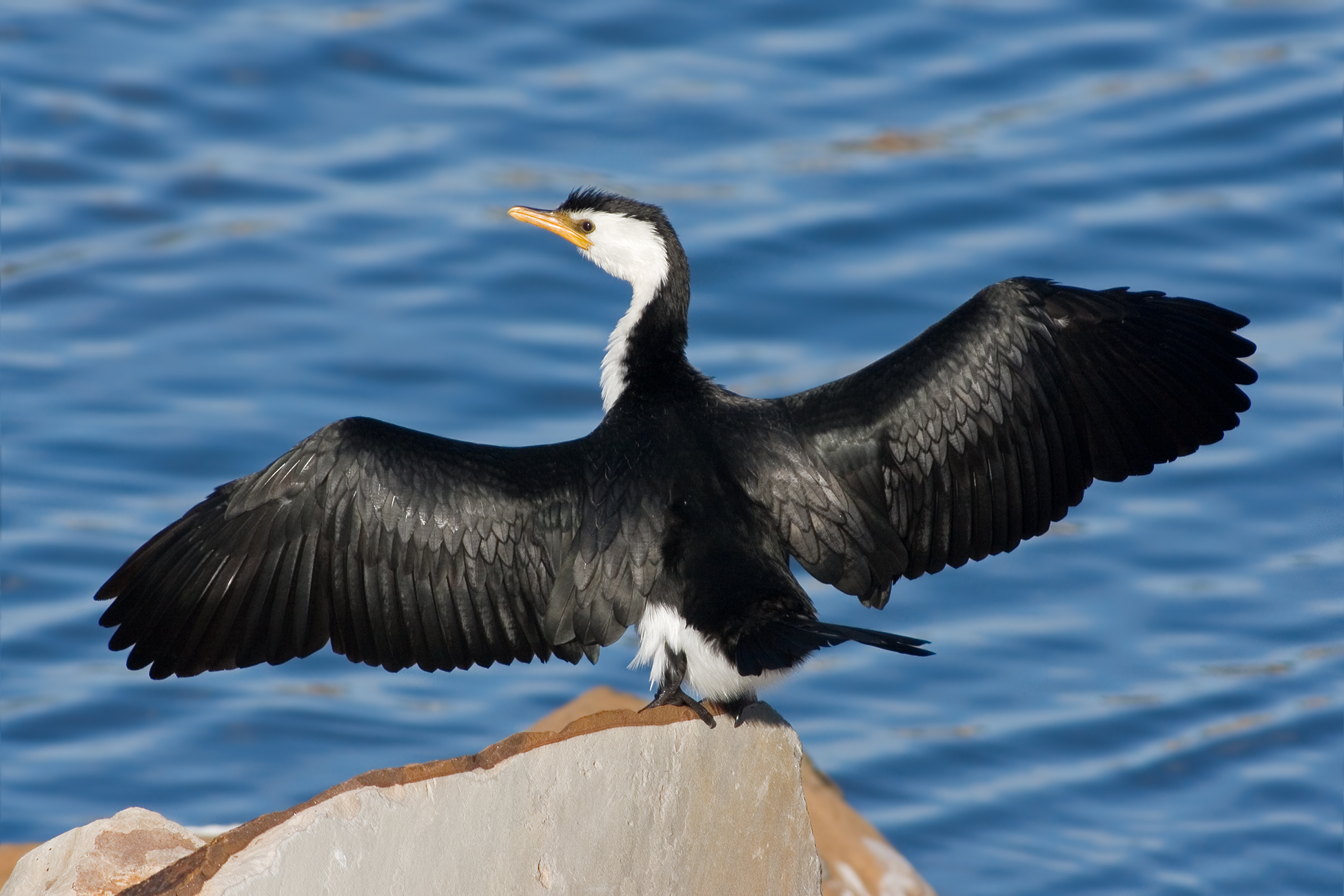
- Little pied cormorant Microcarbo melanoleucos

Scientific classification
- Kingdom: Animalia
- Phylum: Chordata
- Class: Aves
- Order: Suliformes
- Family: Phalacrocoracidae; Reichenbach, 1850

Type genus
- Phalacrocorax

Genera
- Microcarbo; Poikilocarbo; Urile; Phalacrocorax; Gulosus; Nannopterum; Leucocarbo

Synonyms
- List: Australocorax Lambrecht, 1931; Compsohalieus B. Brewer & Ridgway, 1884; Cormoranus Baillon, 1834; Dilophalieus Coues, 1903; Ecmeles Gistel, 1848; Euleucocarbo Voisin, 1973; Halietor Heine, 1860; Hydrocorax Vieillot, 1819 (non Brisson, 1760: preoccupied); Hypoleucus Reichenbach, 1852; Miocorax Lambrecht, 1933; Nesocarbo Voisin, 1973; Notocarbo Siegel-Causey, 1988; Pallasicarbo Coues, 1903; Paracorax Lambrecht, 1933; Pliocarbo Tugarinov, 1940; Stictocarbo Bonaparte, 1855; Viguacarbo Coues, 1903; Anatocarbo; Nanocorax (see text)

= Cormorant =

Cormorants and shags Temporal range: 24–0 Ma Late Oligocene – present

Family of aquatic birds

Phalacrocoracidae is a family of approximately 40 species of aquatic birds found worldwide and commonly known as cormorants and shags. Several different classifications of the family have been proposed, but in 2021 the International Ornithologists' Union (IOU) adopted a consensus taxonomy of seven genera. The common names "cormorant" and "shag" have been assigned to different species in the family somewhat haphazardly.

Cormorants and shags are medium-to-large birds, with body weight in the range of 0.35–5 kilograms (0.77–11.02 lb) and wing span of 60–100 centimetres (24–39 in). The majority of species have dark feathers. The bill is long, thin and hooked. Their feet have webbing between all four toes. All species are fish-eaters, catching the prey by diving from the surface. They are excellent divers, and under water they propel themselves with their feet with help from their wings; some cormorant species have been found to dive as deep as 45 metres (150 ft). Cormorants and shags have relatively short wings due to their need for economical movement underwater, and consequently have among the highest flight costs of any flying bird.

Cormorant colonies nest around seacoasts, in trees, islets or cliffs. They are coastal rather than oceanic birds. Some species have colonised inland waters. Species may be found in all areas of the world except for the central Pacific islands.

Cormorants may descend from a freshwater ancestor in south Asia whose offspring adapted in time to new environments and spread across the Eurasian landmass and the world.

== Names ==
"Cormorant" is a contraction probably derived from Latin corvus marinus, "sea raven"; in the early 19th century, the similarly derived spelling "corvorant" was sometimes used. Indeed, "sea raven" or analogous terms were the usual terms for cormorants in Germanic languages until after the Middle Ages. The French explorer André Thévet commented in 1558: "the beak [is] similar to that of a cormorant or other corvid", which demonstrates that the mistaken belief that the birds were related to ravens lasted at least to the 16th century.

No consistent distinction exists between cormorants and shags. The names "cormorant" and "shag" were originally the common names of the two species of the family found in Great Britain and Ireland – Phalacrocorax carbo (now referred to by ornithologists as the great cormorant) and Gulosus aristotelis (the European shag). "Shag" refers to the bird's crest, which is conspicuous in the European shag, but less so in the great cormorant. As other species were encountered by English-speaking sailors and explorers elsewhere in the world, some were called cormorants and some shags, sometimes depending on whether they had crests or not. Sometimes the same species is called a cormorant in one part of the world and a shag in another; for example, all species in the family which occur in New Zealand are known locally as shags, including four non-endemic species known as cormorant elsewhere in their range. In 1976, Gerard Frederick van Tets proposed to divide the family into two genera and attach the name "cormorant" to one and "shag" to the other, but this nomenclature has not been widely adopted.

== Description ==
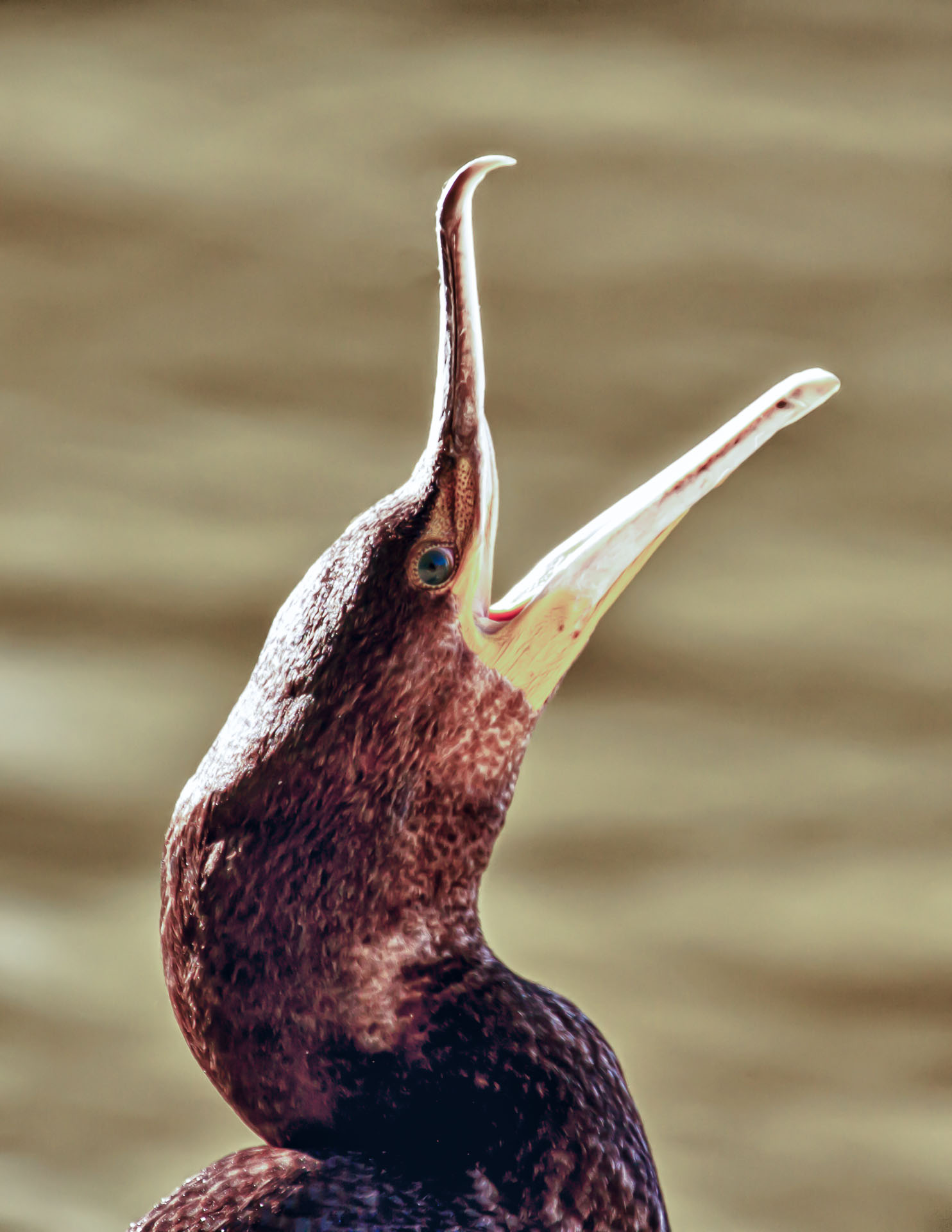
Great cormorant with hooked bill

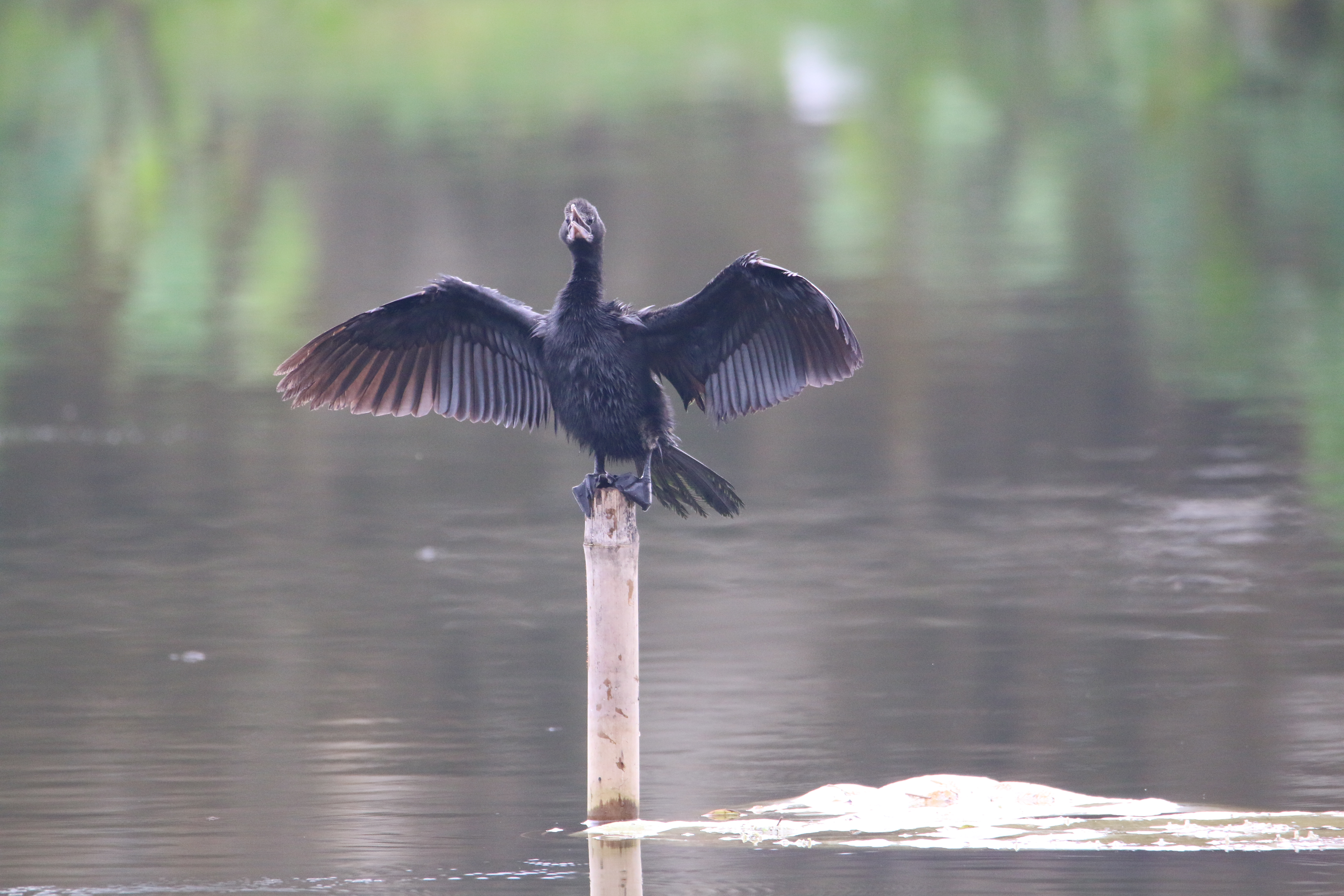
Little cormorant with wings spread

Cormorants and shags are medium-to-large seabirds. They range in size from the pygmy cormorant (Microcarbo pygmaeus), at as little as 45 cm (18 in) and 340 g (12 oz), to the flightless cormorant (Nannopterum harrisi), at a maximum size 100 cm (39 in) and 5 kg (11 lb). The recently extinct spectacled cormorant (Urile perspicillatus) was rather larger, at an average size of 6.3 kg (14 lb). Nearly all the Northern Hemisphere species have mainly dark plumage, but many Southern Hemisphere species are black and white, and a few (e.g. the spotted shag of New Zealand) are quite colourful. Many species have areas of coloured skin on the face (the lores and the gular skin) which can be bright blue, orange, red or yellow, typically becoming more brightly coloured in the breeding season. The bill is long, thin, and sharply hooked. Their feet have webbing between all four toes, as in their relatives.

== Habitat ==
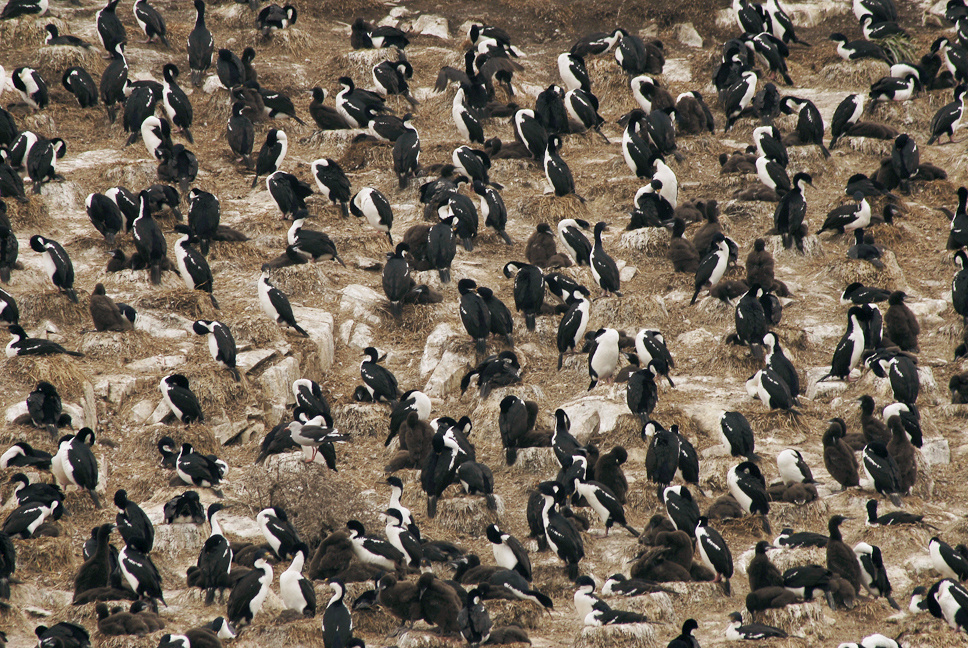
Imperial shags in Beagle Channel

Habitat varies from species to species: some are restricted to seacoasts, while others occur in both coastal and inland waters to varying degrees. They range around the world, except for the central Pacific islands.

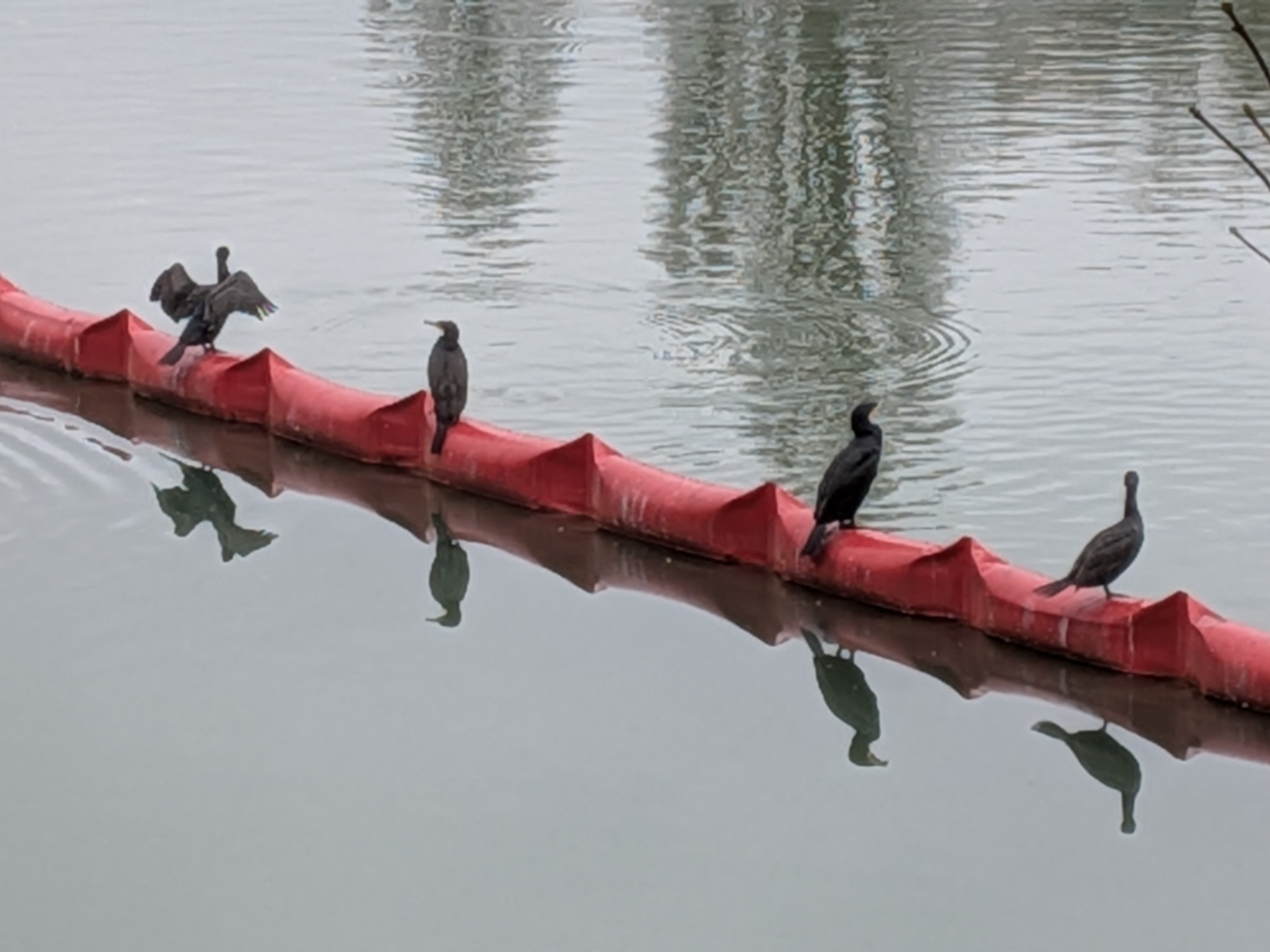
Cormorants in the harbour of Joinville-le-Pont (Val de Marne - France).

== Behaviour ==
All cormorants and shags are fish-eaters, dining on small eels, fish, and even water snakes. They dive from the surface, though many species make a characteristic half-jump as they dive, presumably to give themselves a more streamlined entry into the water. Under water they propel themselves with their feet, though some also propel themselves with their wings (see the picture, commentary, and existing reference video). Imperial shags fitted with miniaturized video recorders have been filmed diving to depths of as much as 80 metres (260 ft) to forage on the sea floor.

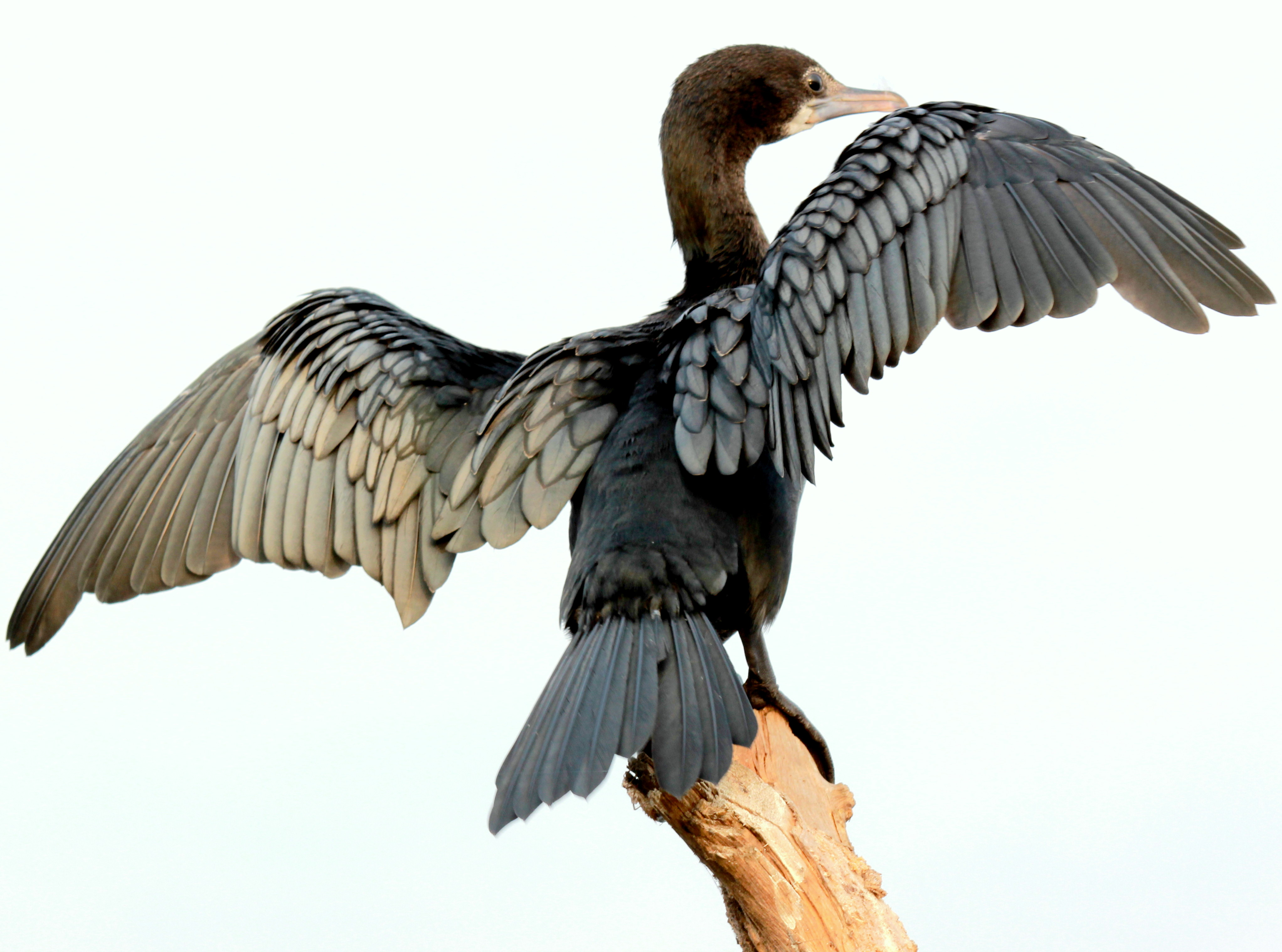
Wing-drying behaviour in a little cormorant

After fishing, cormorants go ashore, and are frequently seen holding their wings out in the sun. All cormorants have preen gland secretions that are used ostensibly to keep the feathers waterproof. Some sources state that cormorants have waterproof feathers while others say that they have water-permeable feathers. Still others suggest that the outer plumage absorbs water but does not permit it to penetrate the layer of air next to the skin. The wing drying action is seen even in the flightless cormorant but not in the Antarctic shags or red-legged cormorants. Alternate functions suggested for the spread-wing posture include that it aids thermoregulation or digestion, balances the bird, or indicates presence of fish. A detailed study of the great cormorant concluded there is little doubt that it serves to dry the plumage.

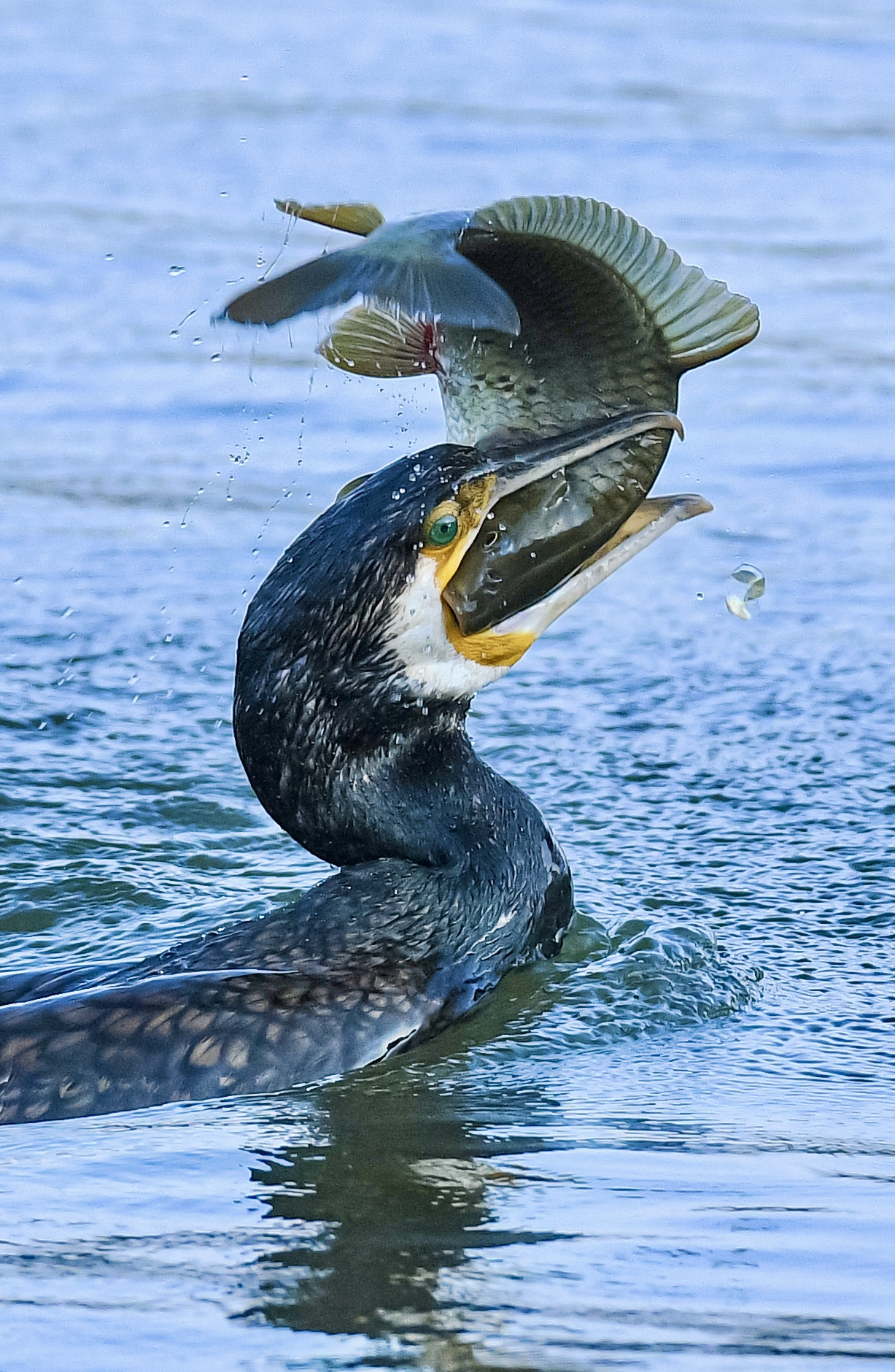
A Cormorant eating a fish at Taudaha Lake

Cormorants are colonial nesters, using trees, rocky islets, or cliffs. The eggs are a chalky-blue colour. There is usually one brood a year. Parents regurgitate food to feed their young.

== Taxonomy ==
The genus Phalacrocorax, from which the family name Phalacrocoracidae is derived, is Latinised from Ancient Greek φαλακρός phalakros "bald" and κόραξ korax "raven". This is thought to refer to the ornamental white head plumes prominent in Mediterranean birds of this species, or the creamy white patch on the cheeks of adult great cormorants, but is certainly not a unifying characteristic of cormorants.

The cormorant family was traditionally placed within the Pelecaniformes or, in the Sibley–Ahlquist taxonomy of the 1990s, the expanded Ciconiiformes. Pelecaniformes in the traditional sense—all waterbird groups with totipalmate foot webbing—are not a monophyletic group, even after the removal of the distantly-related tropicbirds. Their relationships and delimitation – apart from being part of a "higher waterfowl" clade which is similar but not identical to Sibley and Ahlquist's "pan-Ciconiiformes" – remain mostly unresolved. Notwithstanding, all evidence agrees that the cormorants and shags are closer to the darters and Sulidae (gannets and boobies), and perhaps the pelicans or even penguins, than to all other living birds.

In recent years, three preferred treatments of the cormorant family have emerged: either to leave all living cormorants in a single genus, Phalacrocorax, or to split off a few species such as the imperial shag complex (in Leucocarbo) and perhaps the flightless cormorant. Alternatively, the genus may be disassembled altogether and in the most extreme case be reduced to the great, white-breasted and Japanese cormorants. In 2014, a landmark study proposed a 7 genera treatment, which was adopted by the IUCN Red List and BirdLife International, and later by the IOC in 2021, standardizing it.

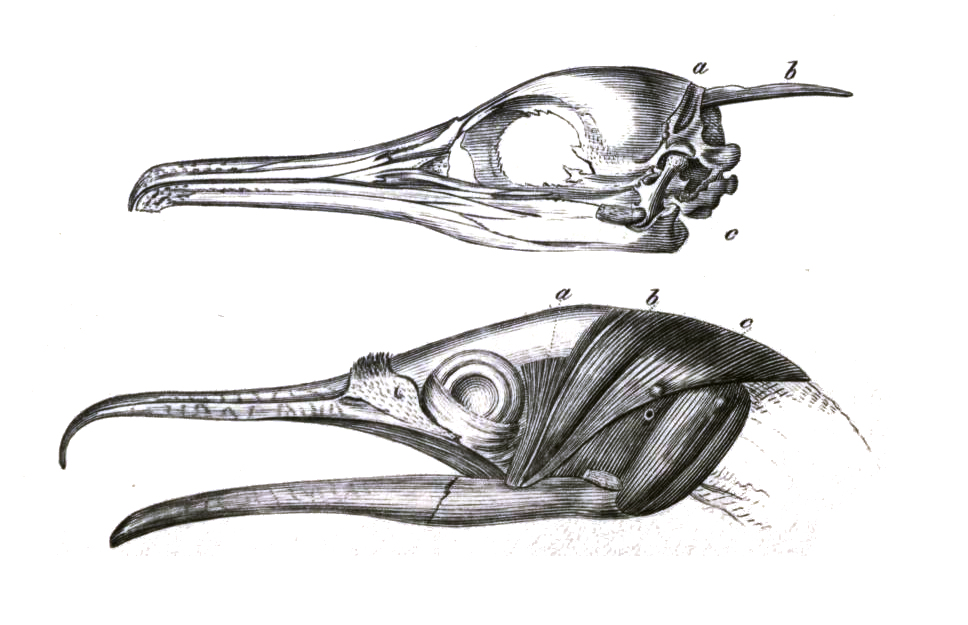
Occipital crest or os nuchale in Phalacrocorax carbo

The cormorants and the darters have a unique bone on the back of the top of the skull known as the os nuchale or occipital style which was called a xiphoid process in early literature. This bony projection provides anchorage for the muscles that increase the force with which the lower mandible is closed. This bone and the highly developed muscles over it, the M. adductor mandibulae caput nuchale, are unique to the families Phalacrocoracidae and Anhingidae.

Several evolutionary groups are still recognizable. However, combining the available evidence suggests that there has also been a great deal of convergent evolution; for example, the cliff shags are a convergent paraphyletic group. The proposed division into Phalacrocorax sensu stricto (or subfamily "Phalacrocoracinae") cormorants and Leucocarbo sensu lato (or "Leucocarboninae") shags does have some degree of merit. The resolution provided by the mtDNA 12S rRNA and ATPase subunits six and eight sequence data is not sufficient to resolve several groups to satisfaction properly; in addition, many species remain unsampled, the fossil record has not been integrated in the data, and the effects of hybridisation – known in some Pacific species especially – on the DNA sequence data are unstudied.

A multigene molecular phylogenetic study published in 2014 provided a genus-level phylogeny of the family; this is now followed by most authorities, including the IOC World Bird List.

- Phalacrocoracidae
  - Microcarbo – Five species
  - - Poikilocarbo – Red-legged cormorant
    - - - Urile – Four species (one extinct)
        - Phalacrocorax – Eleven species
      - - Gulosus – European shag
        - - Nannopterum – Three species
          - Leucocarbo – 15 species

=== List of genera ===
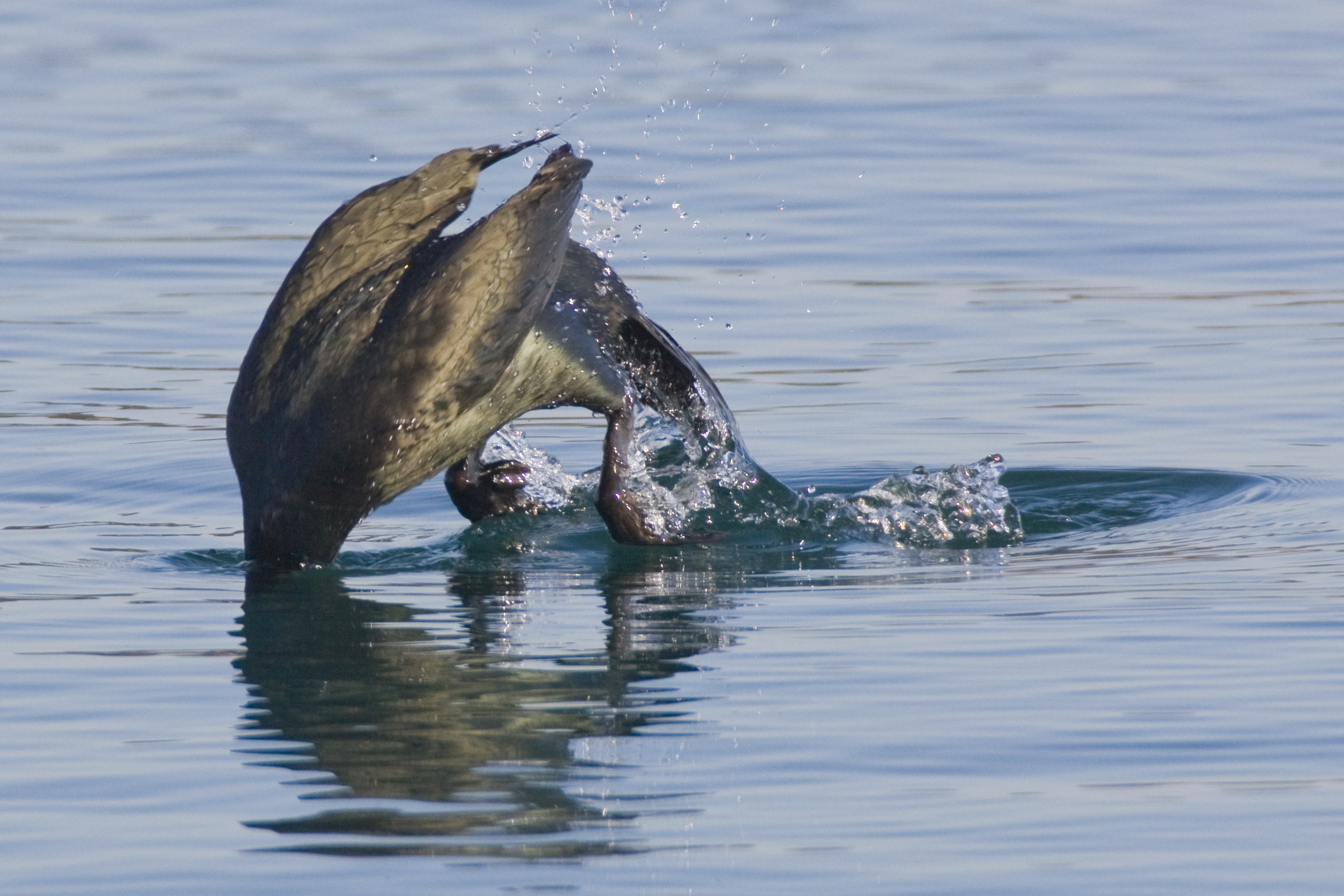
Brandt's cormorant begins its dive, Morro Bay, California

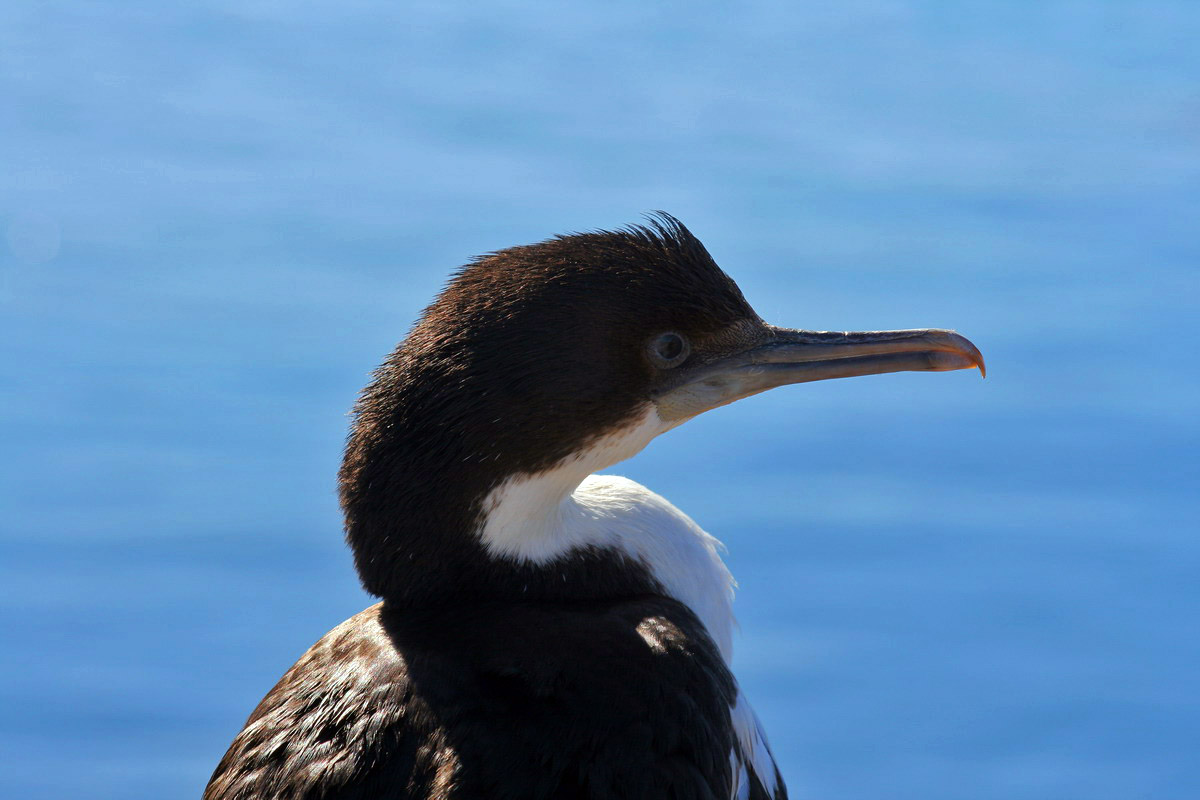
Immature imperial shag (Leucocarbo atriceps)

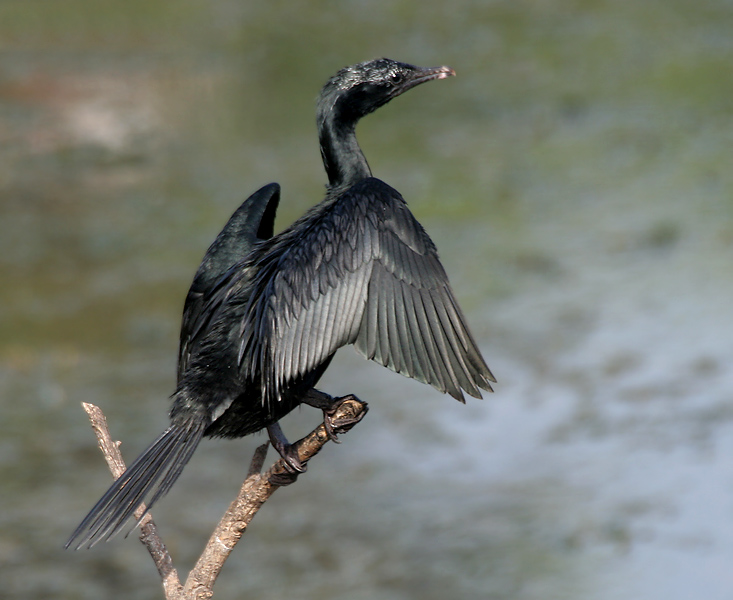
Little cormorant (Microcarbo niger) in Hyderabad, India

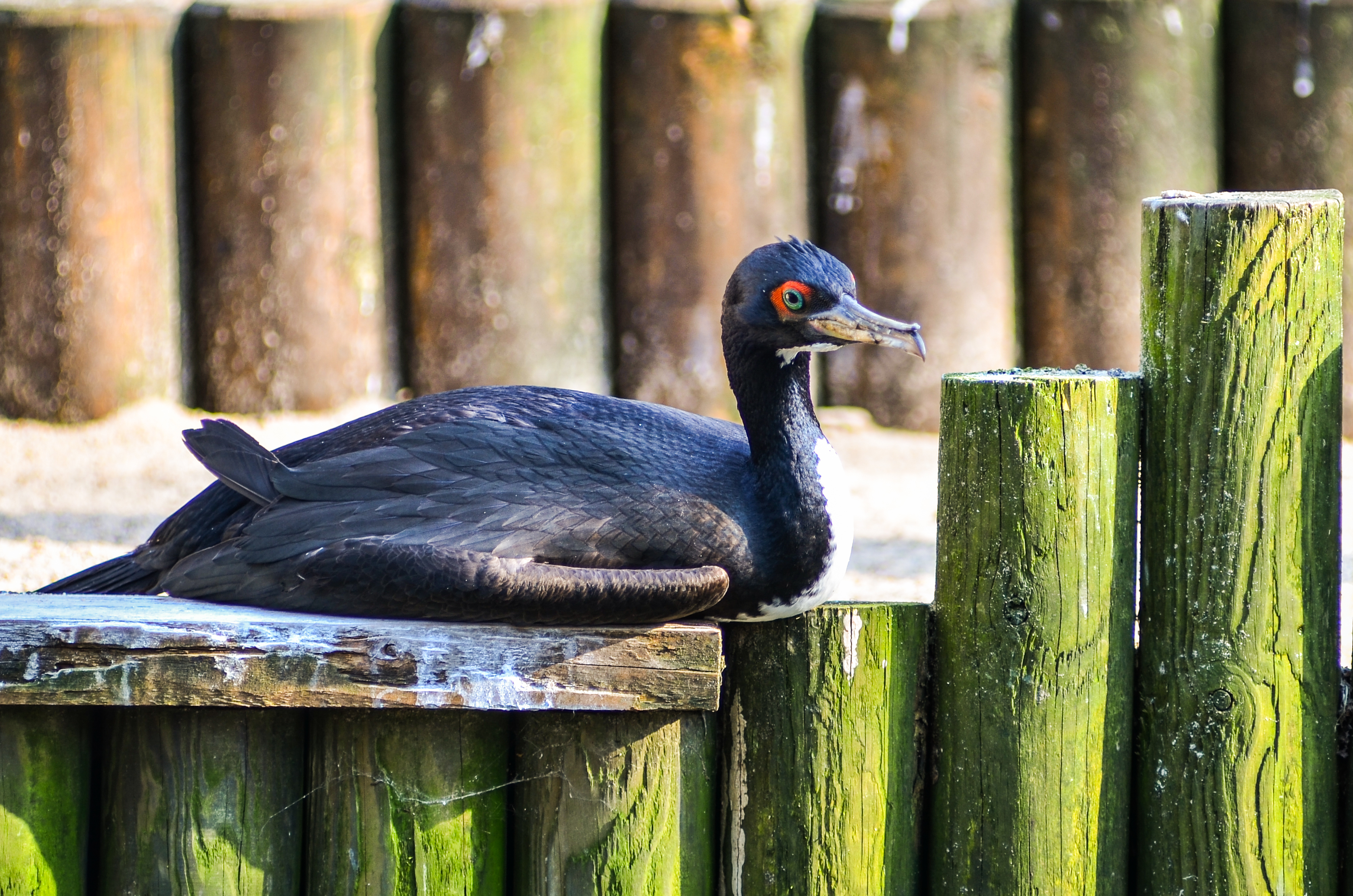
Guanay cormorant (Leucocarbo bougainvillii) at Weltvogelpark Walsrode

Japanese cormorant in Kanagawa, Japan

As per the IOU, the IUCN Red List and BirdLife International, the family contains 7 genera:

| Image | Genus | Species |
|---|---|---|
| | Microcarbo Bonaparte, 1856 | Crowned cormorant Microcarbo coronatus; Little cormorant Microcarbo niger; Little pied cormorant Microcarbo melanoleucos; Pygmy cormorant Microcarbo pygmeus; Reed cormorant or long-tailed cormorant Microcarbo africanus; †Serventys' cormorant Microcarbo serventyorum; Around Indian Ocean, one species extending from Central Asia into Europe. Mostly in freshwater habitat. Small (about 50–60 cm long), nondescript black to dark brown (except for one species with white underparts). |
| | Poikilocarbo Boetticher, 1935 | Red-legged cormorant Poikilocarbo gaimardi; Subtropical to subantarctic Pacific South America, ranging a bit into the southwestern Atlantic. Maritime. Mid-sized (around 75 cm), grey with scalloped wings and contrasting white/yellow/red neck mark and bare parts. Its high-pitched chirping calls are quite unlike those of other cormorants. |
| | Urile Bonaparte, 1855 | Brandt's cormorant Urile penicillatus; Red-faced cormorant Urile urile; Pelagic cormorant Urile pelagicus; Spectacled cormorant †Urile perspicillatus; Northern Pacific, one species extending into subtropical waters on the American West Coast. Maritime. Smallish to large (65–100 cm), generally black with metallic sheen (usually blue/green), in breeding plumage with bright bare facial skin in the eye region and two crests (crown and nape). |
| | Phalacrocorax Brisson, 1760 | Bank cormorant Phalacrocorax neglectus; Socotra cormorant Phalacrocorax nigrogularis; Pitt shag Phalacrocorax featherstoni; Spotted shag Phalacrocorax punctatus; Black-faced cormorant Phalacrocorax fuscescens; Australian pied cormorant Phalacrocorax varius; Little black cormorant Phalacrocorax sulcirostris; Indian cormorant Phalacrocorax fuscicollis; Cape cormorant Phalacrocorax capensis; Japanese cormorant or Temminck's cormorant Phalacrocorax capillatus; Great cormorant (including white-breasted cormorant and black shag) Phalacrocorax carbo; Mostly around the Indian Ocean, one species group extending throughout Eurasia and to Atlantic North America. Maritime to freshwater. Size very variable (60–100 cm), blackish with metallic sheen (usually bronze to purple) and/or white cheek and thigh patches or underside at least in breeding plumage; usually a patch of bare yellow skin at the base of the bill. |
| | Gulosus Montagu, 1813 | European shag Gulosus aristotelis; Breeds in the European Arctic, winters in Europe and North Africa. Maritime. Mid-sized (70–80 cm), glossy black, in breeding plumage with a forehead crest curled to the front. |
| | Nannopterum Sharpe, 1899 | Flightless cormorant Nannopterum harrisi; Neotropic cormorant Nannopterum brasilianum; Double-crested cormorant Nannopterum auritum; Throughout the Americas. Mostly freshwater. Smallish to large (65–100 cm), nondescript brownish-black. One species with white tufts on sides of head in breeding plumage. |
| | Leucocarbo Bonaparte, 1856 | Rock shag or Magellanic cormorant Leucocarbo magellanicus; Guanay cormorant Leucocarbo bougainvillii; Bounty shag Leucocarbo ranfurlyi; New Zealand king shag or rough-faced shag Leucocarbo carunculatus; Chatham shag Leucocarbo onslowi; Stewart Island shag (including Foveaux shag L. stewarti) Leucocarbo chalconotus; Auckland shag Leucocarbo colensoi; Campbell shag Leucocarbo campbelli; Imperial shag or blue-eyed shag Leucocarbo atriceps; South Georgia shag Leucocarbo georgianus; Crozet shag Leucocarbo melanogenis; Antarctic shag Leucocarbo bransfieldensis; Kerguelen shag Leucocarbo verrucosus; Heard Island shag Leucocarbo nivalis; Macquarie shag Leucocarbo purpurascens; Generally Subantarctic, but extending farther north in South America; many oceanic-island endemics. Maritime. Smallish to largish (65–80 cm), typically black above and white below, and with bare yellow or red skin in the facial region. A southern circumpolar group of several species (the blue-eyed shag complex) is characterised by bright blue orbital skin. |

Prior to 2021, the IOU (or formerly the IOC) classified all these species in just three genera: Microcarbo, Leucocarbo, and a broad Phalacrocorax containing all remaining species; however, this treatment rendered Phalacrocorax deeply paraphyletic with respect to Leucocarbo. Other authorities, such as the Clements Checklist, formerly recognised only Microcarbo as a separate genus from Phalacrocorax.

=== Evolution and fossil record ===
The details of the evolution of the cormorants are mostly unknown. Even the technique of using the distribution and relationships of a species to figure out where it came from, biogeography, usually very informative, does not give very specific data for this probably rather ancient and widespread group. However, the closest living relatives of the cormorants and shags are the other families of the suborder Sulae—darters and gannets and boobies—which have a primarily Gondwanan distribution. Hence, at least the modern diversity of Sulae probably originated in the southern hemisphere.

While the Leucocarbonines are almost certainly of southern Pacific origin—possibly even the Antarctic which, at the time when cormorants evolved, was not yet ice-covered—all that can be said about the Phalacrocoracines is that they are most diverse in the regions bordering the Indian Ocean, but generally occur over a large area.

Similarly, the origin of the family is shrouded in uncertainties. Some Late Cretaceous fossils have been proposed to belong with the Phalacrocoracidae:
A scapula from the Campanian-Maastrichtian boundary, about 70 mya (million years ago), was found in the Nemegt Formation in Mongolia; it is now in the PIN collection. It is from a bird roughly the size of a spectacled cormorant, and quite similar to the corresponding bone in Phalacrocorax. A Maastrichtian (Late Cretaceous, c. 66 mya) right femur, AMNH FR 25272 from the Lance Formation near Lance Creek, Wyoming, is sometimes suggested to be the second-oldest record of the Phalacrocoracidae; this was from a rather smaller bird, about the size of a long-tailed cormorant. However, cormorants likely originated much later, and these are likely misidentifications.

As the Early Oligocene "Sula" ronzoni cannot be assigned to any of the sulid families—cormorants and shags, darters, and gannets and boobies—with certainty, the best interpretation is that the Phalacrocoracidae diverged from their closest ancestors in the Early Oligocene, perhaps some 30 million years ago, and that the Cretaceous fossils represent ancestral sulids, "pelecaniforms" or "higher waterbirds"; at least the last lineage is generally believed to have been already distinct and undergoing evolutionary radiation at the end of the Cretaceous. What can be said with near certainty is that AMNH FR 25272 is from a diving bird that used its feet for underwater locomotion; as this is liable to result in some degree of convergent evolution and the bone is missing indisputable neornithine features, it is not entirely certain that the bone is correctly referred to this group.

Phylogenetic evidence indicates that the cormorants diverged from their closest relatives, the darters, during the Late Oligocene, indicating that most of the claims of Cretaceous or early Paleogene cormorant occurrences are likely misidentifications.

During the late Paleogene, when the family presumably originated, much of Eurasia was covered by shallow seas, as the Indian Plate finally attached to the mainland. Lacking a detailed study, it may well be that the first "modern" cormorants were small species from eastern, south-eastern or southern Asia, possibly living in freshwater habitat, that dispersed due to tectonic events. Such a scenario would account for the present-day distribution of cormorants and shags and is not contradicted by the fossil record; as remarked above, a thorough review of the problem is not yet available.

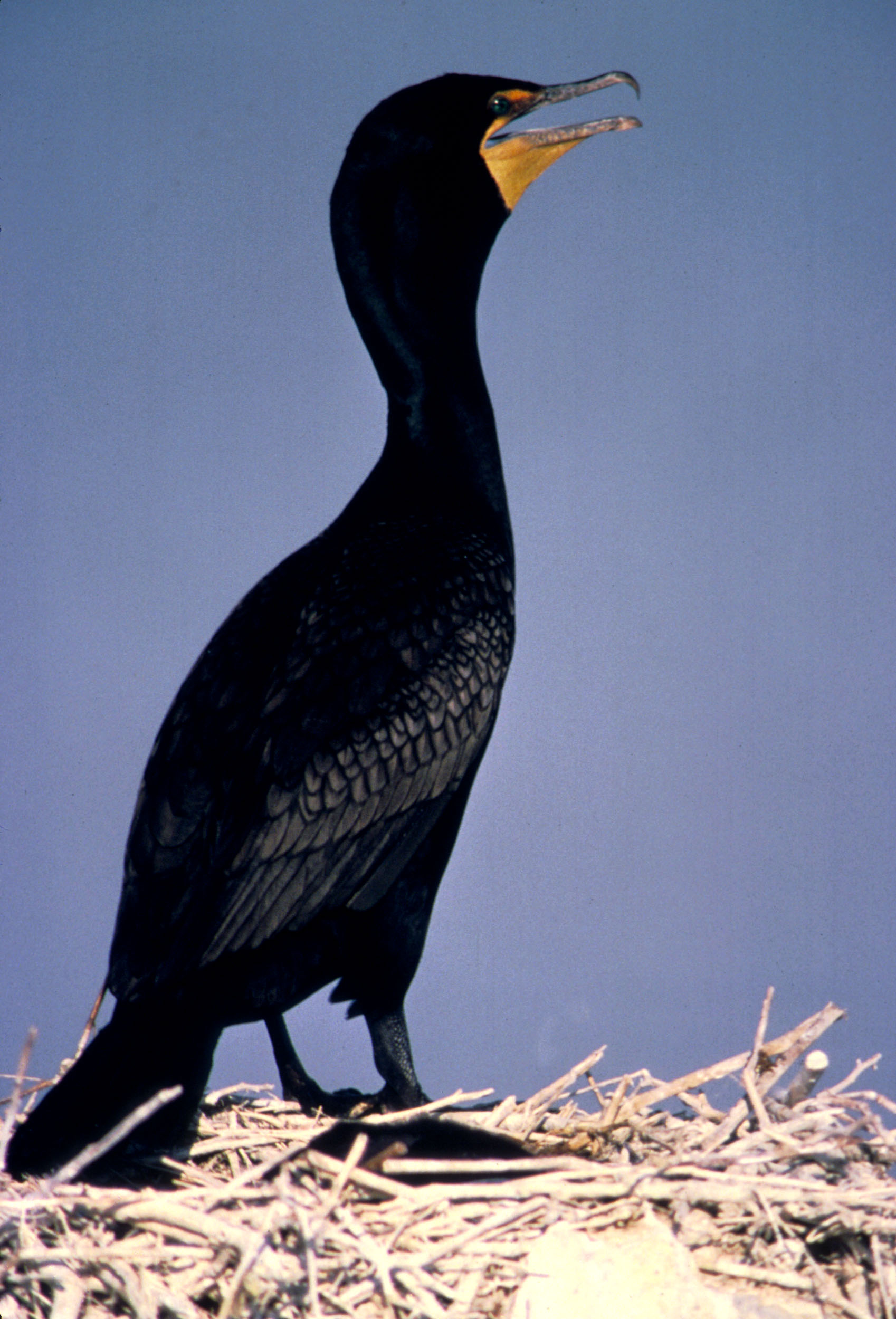
Double-crested cormorant

Even when Phalacrocorax was used to unite all living species, two distinct genera of prehistoric cormorants became widely accepted today:

- Limicorallus (Indricotherium middle Oligocene of Chelkar-Teniz, Kazakhstan)
- Nectornis (Late Oligocene/Early Miocene of Central Europe – Middle Miocene of Bes-Konak, Turkey) – includes Oligocorax miocaenus

The proposed genus Oligocorax appears to be paraphyletic; the European species have been separated in Nectornis, and the North American ones placed in the expanded Phalacrocorax; the latter might just as well be included in Nannopterum. A Late Oligocene fossil cormorant foot from Enspel, Germany, sometimes placed in Oligocorax, would then be referable to Nectornis if it proves not to be too distinct. Limicorallus, meanwhile, was initially believed to be a rail or a dabbling duck by some. There are also undescribed remains of apparent cormorants from the Quercy Phosphorites of Quercy (France), dating to some time between the Late Eocene and the mid-Oligocene. All these early European species might belong to the basal group of "microcormorants", as they conform with them in size and seem to have inhabited the same habitat: subtropical coastal or inland waters. While this need not be more than convergence, the phylogeny of the modern (sub)genus Microcarbo – namely, whether the Western Eurasian M. pygmaeus is a basal or highly derived member of its clade – is still not well understood at all as of 2022.

Some other Paleogene remains are sometimes assigned to the Phalacrocoracidae, but these birds seem rather intermediate between cormorants and darters (and lack clear autapomorphies of either). Thus, they may be quite basal members of the Palacrocoracoidea. The taxa in question are:

- Piscator (Late Eocene of England)
- "Pelecaniformes" gen. et sp. indet. (Jebel Qatrani Early Oligocene of Fayum, Egypt) – similar to Piscator?
- Borvocarbo (Late Oligocene of C Europe)
- Bavaricarbo (Miocene of Germany)

The supposed Late Pliocene/Early Pleistocene "Valenticarbo" is a nomen dubium and given its recent age probably not a separate genus.

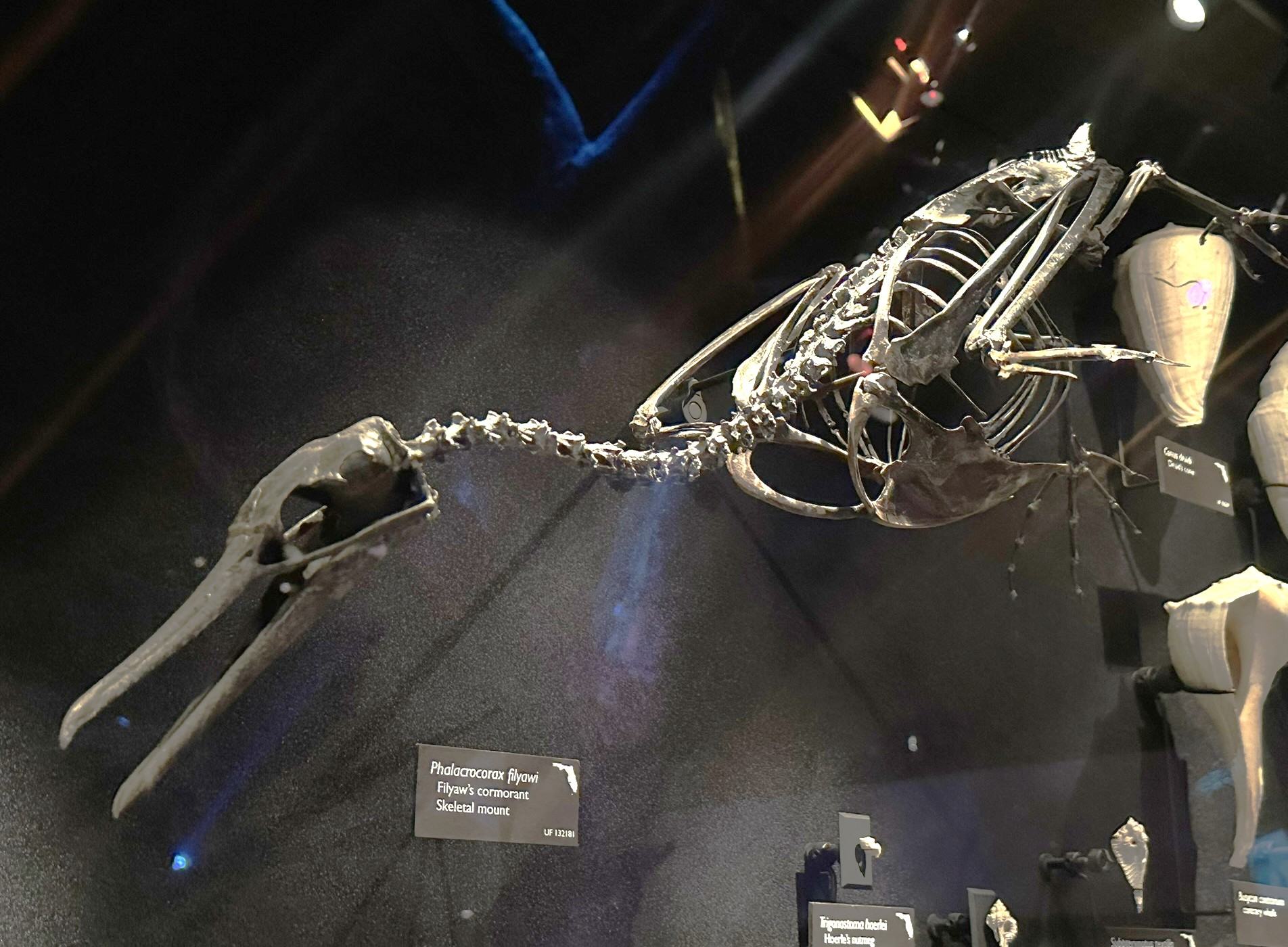
Reconstructed fossil skeleton of the extinct Miocene-aged Phalacrocorax filyawi, Florida Museum of Natural History

The remaining fossil species are not usually placed in a modern phylogenetic framework. While the numerous western US species are most likely prehistoric representatives of the coastal Urile or inland Nannopterum, the European fossils pose much more of a problem due to the singular common shag being intermediate in size between the other two European cormorant lineages, and as of 2022 still of mysterious ancestry; notably, a presumably lost collection of Late Miocene fossils from the Odesa region may have contained remains of all three (sub)genera inhabiting Europe today. Similarly, the Plio-Pleistocene fossils from Florida have been allied with Nannopterum and even Urile, but may conceivably be Phalacrocorax; they are in serious need of revision since it is not even clear how many species are involved. Provisionally, the fossil species are thus all placed in Phalacrocorax here:

- Phalacrocorax marinavis (Oligocene – Early Miocene of Oregon, US) – formerly Oligocorax; Urile or Nannopterum?
- Phalacrocorax littoralis (Late Oligocene/Early Miocene of St-Gérand-le-Puy, France) – formerly Oligocorax; Nectornis?
- Phalacrocorax intermedius (Early – Middle Miocene of C Europe) – includes P. praecarbo, Ardea/P. brunhuberi and Botaurites avitus; Microcarbo, Phalacrocorax or Gulosus?
- Phalacrocorax macropus (Early Miocene – Pliocene of north-west US) – Urile or Nannopterum?
- Phalacrocorax ibericus (Late Miocene of Valles de Fuentiduena, Spain) – Microcarbo, Phalacrocorax or Gulosus?
- Phalacrocorax lautus (Late Miocene of Golboçica, Moldavia) – Microcarbo, Phalacrocorax or Gulosus?
- Phalacrocorax serdicensis (Late Miocene of Hrabarsko, Bulgaria); Microcarbo, Phalacrocorax or Gulosus?
- Phalacrocorax sp(p). (Late Miocene of Odesa region, Ukraine) – up to 4 species, one of which is probably P. longipes; Microcarbo, Phalacrocorax and/or Gulosus?
- Phalacrocorax femoralis (Modelo Late Miocene/Early Pliocene of WC North America) – formerly Miocorax; Nannopterum?
- Phalacrocorax sp. (Late Miocene/Early Pliocene of Lee Creek Mine, US) – Nannopterum or Phalacrocorax?
- Phalacrocorax sp. 1 (Late Miocene/Early Pliocene of WC South America) – probably Leucocarbo
- Phalacrocorax sp. 2 (Pisco Late Miocene/Early Pliocene of SW Peru) – Poikilocarbo or Leucocarbo?
- Phalacrocorax longipes (Late Miocene – Early Pliocene of Ukraine) – formerly Pliocarbo; Microcarbo, Phalacrocorax or Gulosus?
- Phalacrocorax goletensis (Early Pliocene – Early Pleistocene of Mexico) – Urile or Nannopterum, perhaps Poikilocarbo or Leuocarbo
- Phalacrocorax wetmorei (Bone Valley Early Pliocene of Florida) – Nannopterum or Phalacrocorax?
- Phalacrocorax sp. (Bone Valley Early Pliocene of Polk County, Florida, US) – Nannopterum or Phalacrocorax?
- Phalacrocorax leptopus (Juntura Early/Middle Pliocene of Juntura, Malheur County, Oregon, US) – Nannopterum?
- Phalacrocorax reliquus (Middle Pliocene of Mongolia) – Microcarbo, Phalacrocorax or Gulosus?
- Phalacrocorax idahensis (Middle Pliocene – Pleistocene of Idaho, US, and possibly Florida) – Nannopterum?
- Phalacrocorax destefanii (Late Pliocene of Italy) – formerly Paracorax; Microcarbo, Phalacrocorax or Gulosus?
- Phalacrocorax filyawi (Pinecrest Late Pliocene of Florida, US) – may be P. idahensis; Nannopterum or Phalacrocorax, perhaps Urile?
- Phalacrocorax kennelli (San Diego Late Pliocene of California, US) – Urile or Nannopterum?
- Phalacrocorax kumeyaay (San Diego Late Pliocene of California, US) – Urile or Nannopterum?
- Phalacrocorax macer (Late Pliocene of Idaho, US) – Nannopterum?
- Phalacrocorax mongoliensis (Late Pliocene of W Mongolia) – Microcarbo, Phalacrocorax or Gulosus?
- Phalacrocorax sp. (La Portada Late Pliocene of N Chile) – may be same as Late Miocene/Early Pliocene "Phalacrocorax sp. 2"; Poikilocarbo or Leucocarbo?
- Phalacrocorax rogersi (Late Pliocene – Early Pleistocene of California, US) – Urile or Nannopterum?
- Phalacrocorax chapalensis (Late Pliocene/Early Pleistocene of Jalisco, Mexico) – Urile or Nannopterum, perhaps Poikilocarbo or Leucocarbo?
- Phalacrocorax gregorii (Late Pleistocene of Australia) – possibly not a valid species; Microcarbo, Phalacrocorax or Leucocarbo?
- Phalacrocorax vetustus (Late Pleistocene of Australia) – formerly Australocorax, possibly not a valid species; Microcarbo, Phalacrocorax or Leucocarbo?
- Phalacrocorax sp. (Sarasota County, Florida, US) – may be P. filawyi/idahensis; Nannopterum or Phalacrocorax?

The former "Phalacrocorax" (or "Oligocorax") mediterraneus is now considered to belong to the bathornithid Paracrax antiqua. "P." subvolans was actually a darter (Anhinga).

== In human culture ==
=== Cormorant culling ===
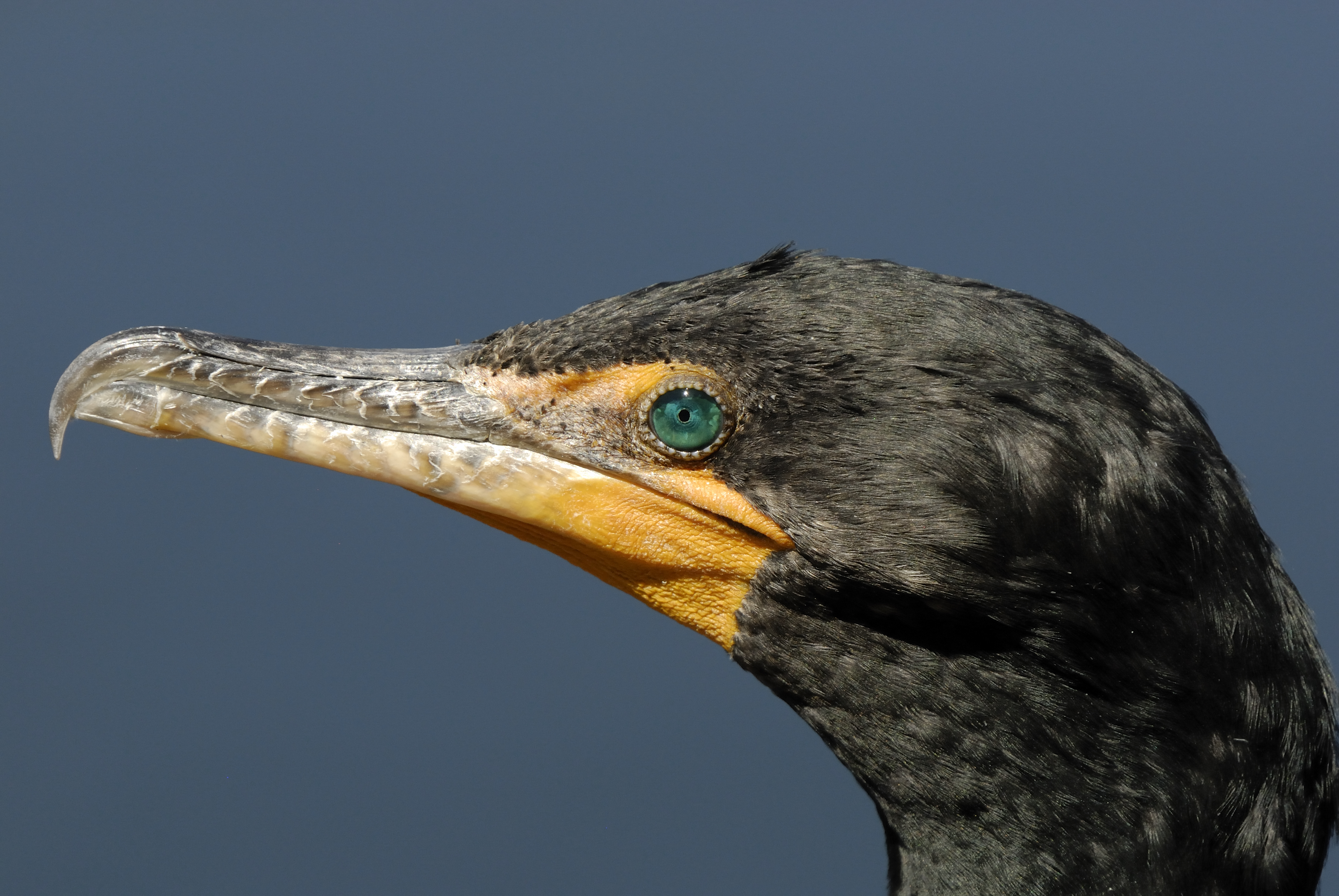
Double-crested cormorant

Cormorant culling is the intentional killing of cormorants by humans for the purposes of wildlife management. It has been practiced for centuries, with supporters of culling generally arising from the angling community. Culling techniques may involve the killing of birds, the destruction of eggs, or both. Historically, culls have occurred to protect the interests of recreational and commercial fishermen who perceive the animals to be competing with them for their intended catch or for the prey of their intended catch. Since the 1960s, the growing aquaculture industry has undertaken cormorant culls to protect its farmed fish and crustacean stocks. Opponents of cormorant culling include conservation groups such as the National Audubon Society, Cormorant Defenders International and Sea Shepherd.

=== Cormorant fishing ===
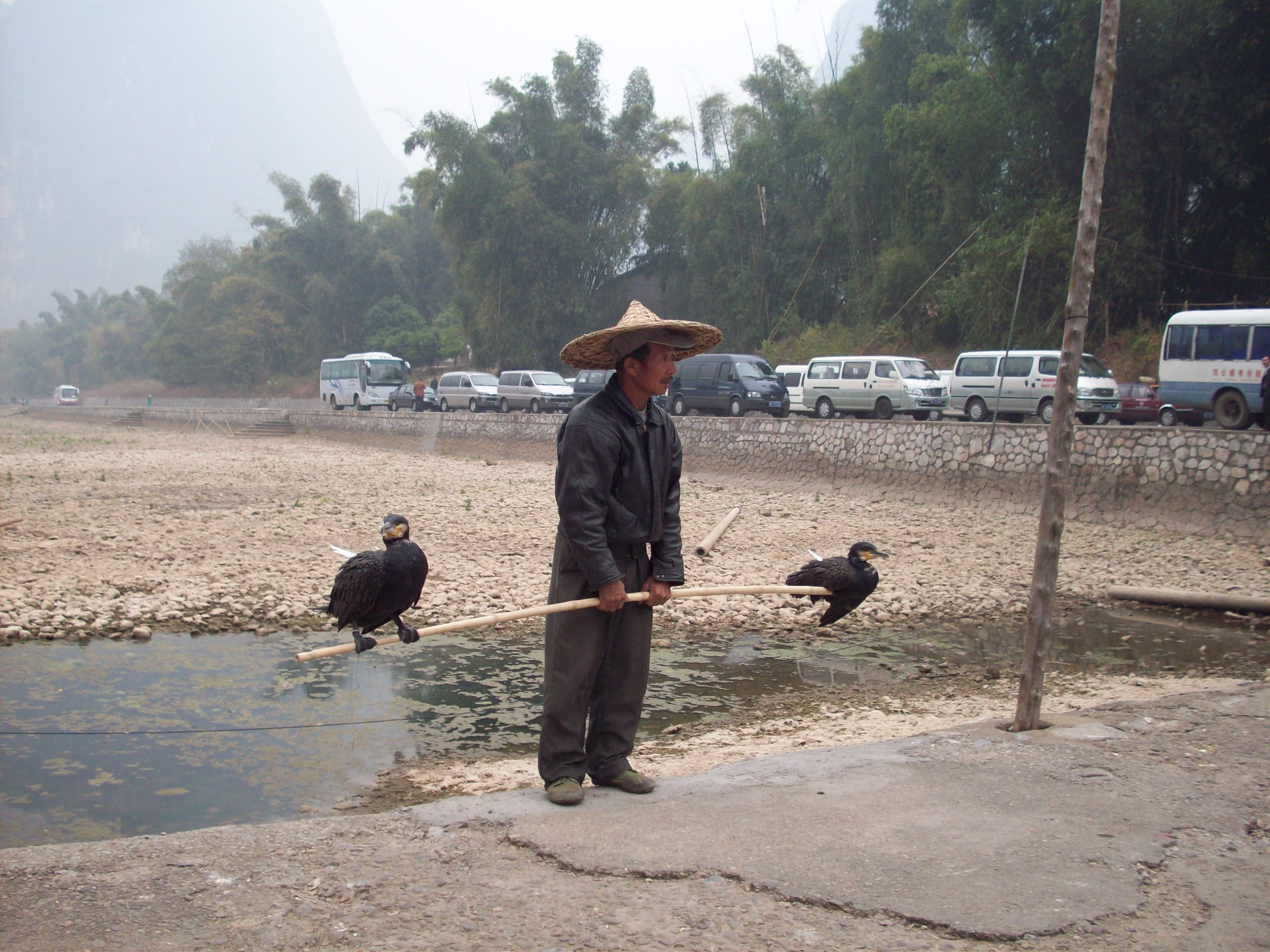
A Chinese fisherman with his two cormorants

Humans have used cormorants' fishing skills in various places in the world. Archaeological evidence suggests that cormorant fishing was practised in Ancient Egypt, Peru, Korea and India, but the strongest tradition has remained in China and Japan, where it reached commercial-scale level in some areas. In Japan, cormorant fishing is called ukai (鵜飼) and is performed by a fisherman known as an usho. Traditional forms of ukai can be seen on the Nagara River in the city of Gifu, Gifu Prefecture, where cormorant fishing has continued uninterrupted for 1300 years, or in the city of Inuyama, Aichi. In Guilin, Guangxi, cormorants are famous for fishing on the shallow Li River. In Gifu, the Japanese cormorant (P. capillatus) is used; Chinese fishermen often employ great cormorants (P. carbo). In Europe, a similar practice was also used on Doiran Lake in the region of Macedonia. James VI and I appointed a keeper of cormorants, John Wood, and built ponds at Westminster to train the birds to fish.

In a common technique, a snare is tied near the base of the bird's throat, which allows the bird only to swallow small fish. When the bird captures and tries to swallow a large fish, the fish is caught in the bird's throat. When the bird returns to the fisherman's raft, the fisherman helps the bird to remove the fish from its throat. The method is not as common today, since more efficient methods of catching fish have been developed, but is still practised as a cultural tradition.

In Japan, environmental changes threaten traditional ukai because of reduced numbers of the ayu river fish that cormorants are used to catch.

=== In folklore, literature, and art ===
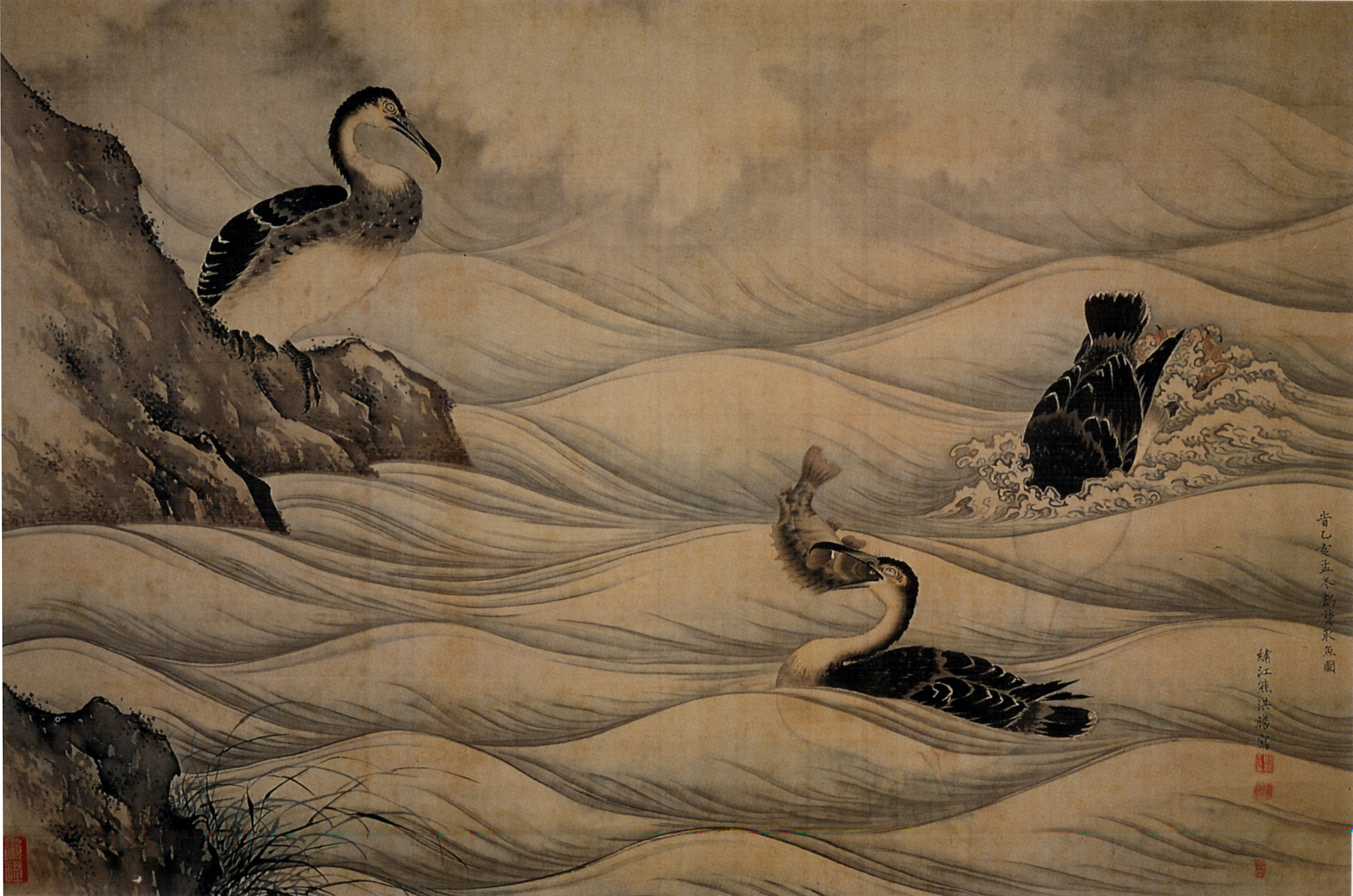
Cormorants catching Fish. Hanging silk scroll by Yūhi, Middle Edo period, Japan, 1755

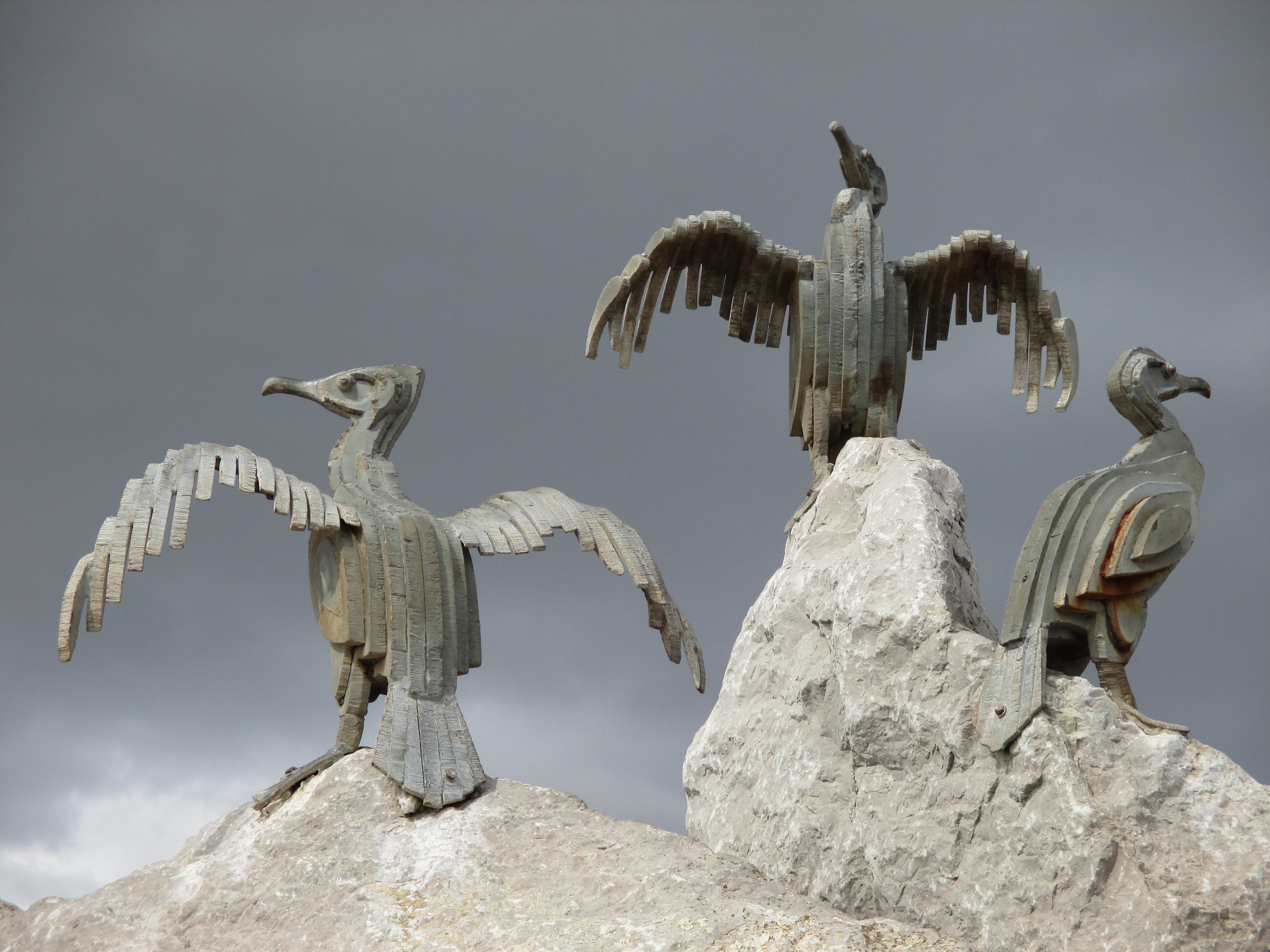
Cormorant sculpture by Brian Fell on the Stone Jetty, Morecambe

Cormorants feature in heraldry and medieval ornamentation, usually in their "wing-drying" pose, which was seen as representing the Christian cross, and symbolizing nobility and sacrifice. In Paradise Lost, Satan assumes the form of a cormorant during his first intrusion into the Garden of Eden, representing greed.

In some Scandinavian areas, they are considered good omen; in particular, in Norwegian tradition spirits of those lost at sea come to visit their loved ones disguised as cormorants. For example, the Norwegian municipalities of Røst, Loppa and Skjervøy have cormorants in their coat of arms. The symbolic liver bird of Liverpool is commonly thought to be a cross between an eagle and a cormorant.

In Homer's epic poem The Odyssey, the isle of the sea-nymph Calypso is described as having cormorants present alongside owls and falcons, and Hermes is likened to a cormorant when he arrives to command the nymph Calypso to let Odysseus return home. McCullagh suggests that the cormorant, associated with cypress trees, might act in part as a symbol of death and decay in the text.

In 1853, a woman wearing a dress made of cormorant feathers was found on San Nicolas Island, off the southern coast of California. She had sewn the feather dress together using whale sinews. She is known as the Lone Woman of San Nicolas and was later baptised "Juana Maria" (her original name is lost). The woman had lived alone on the island for 18 years before being rescued. When removed from San Nicolas, she brought with her a green cormorant dress she made; this dress is reported to have been removed to the Vatican. Juana Maria's story was fictionalized in the children's novel Island of the Blue Dolphins.

The bird has inspired numerous writers, including Amy Clampitt, who wrote a poem called "The Cormorant in its Element". The species she described may have been the pelagic cormorant, which is the only species in the temperate U.S. with the "slim head ... vermilion-strapped" and "big black feet" that she mentions.

A cormorant representing Blanche Ingram appears in the first of the fictional paintings by Jane in Charlotte Brontë's novel Jane Eyre:

One gleam of light lifted into relief a half-submerged mast, on which sat a cormorant, dark and large, with wings flecked with foam; its beak held a gold bracelet, set with gems, that I had touched with as brilliant tints as my palette could yield, and as glittering distinctness as my pencil could impart.

In the Sherlock Holmes story "The Adventure of the Veiled Lodger", Dr. Watson warns that if there are further attempts to get at and destroy his private notes regarding his time with Sherlock Holmes, "the whole story concerning the politician, the lighthouse, and the trained cormorant will be given to the public. There is at least one reader who will understand."

A cormorant is humorously mentioned as having had linseed oil rubbed into it by a wayward pupil during the "Growth and Learning" segment of the 1983 Monty Python film Monty Python's The Meaning of Life.

The cormorant served as the hood ornament for the Packard automobile brand.

Cormorants (and books about them written by a fictional ornithologist) are a recurring fascination of the protagonist in Jesse Ball's 2018 novel Census.

The Pokémon Cramorant, introduced in Pokémon Sword and Shield, closely resembles a cormorant in both design and name.

The cormorant was chosen as the emblem for the Ministry of Defence Joint Services Command and Staff College at Shrivenham. A bird famed for flight, sea fishing and land nesting was felt to be particularly appropriate for a college that unified leadership training and development for the Army, Navy and Royal Air Force.

After a member produced a mock magazine cover from a photograph of roosting cormorants, the bird became the unofficial mascot of the Pentax Discuss Mailing List with many posts dedicated to discussion of the photography of the species.

Stephen Gregory’s 1987 horror novel The Cormorant concerns a man who inherits both a cottage and a cormorant from his late uncle. The 1993 film adaptation stars Ralph Fiennes and is directed by Peter Markham.

The titular protagonist of Seth Dickinson’s hard fantasy series The Masquerade is The Traitor Baru Cormorant, who is named after the bird.

== See also ==
- Anhinga
- Cormorant culling
- Liver bird

== Sources ==
- Benson, Elizabeth (1972): The Mochica: A Culture of Peru. Praeger Press, New York.
- Berrin, Katherine & Larco Museum (1997) The Spirit of Ancient Peru: Treasures from the Museo Arqueológico Rafael Larco Herrera. Thames and Hudson, New York.
- Cracraft, Joel (1971). "Systematics and evolution of the Gruiformes (Class Aves). 2. Additional comments on the Bathornithidae, with descriptions of new species". American Museum Novitates (2449): 1–14. hdl:2246/2658.
- Dorst, J. & Mougin, J.L. (1979): Family Phalacrocoracidae. In: Mayr, Ernst & Cottrell, G.W. (eds.): Check-List of the Birds of the World Vol. 1, 2nd ed. (Struthioniformes, Tinamiformes, Procellariiformes, Sphenisciformes, Gaviiformes, Podicipediformes, Pelecaniformes, Ciconiiformes, Phoenicopteriformes, Falconiformes, Anseriformes): 163–179. Museum of Comparative Zoology, Cambridge.
- Hope, Sylvia (2002): The Mesozoic radiation of Neornithes. In: Chiappe, Luis M. & Witmer, Lawrence M. (eds.): Mesozoic Birds: Above the Heads of Dinosaurs: 339–388. ISBN 0-520-20094-2
- Howard, Hildegarde (1932). "A New Species of Cormorant from Pliocene Deposits near Santa Barbara, California". The Condor. 34 (3): 118–120. doi:10.2307/1363540. JSTOR 1363540.
- IUCN (2007): 2007 IUCN Red List of Threatened Species Archived 27 June 2014 at the Wayback Machine. IUCN, Gland.
- Kennedy, Martyn; Gray, Russell D.; Spencer, Hamish G. (December 2000). "The Phylogenetic Relationships of the Shags and Cormorants: Can Sequence Data Resolve a Disagreement between Behavior and Morphology?". Molecular Phylogenetics and Evolution. 17 (3): 345–359. Bibcode:2000MolPE..17..345K. doi:10.1006/mpev.2000.0840. PMID 11133189.
- Kurochkin, Evgeny N. (1995). "Synopsis of Mesozoic birds and early evolution of Class Aves" (PDF). Archaeopteryx. 13: 47–66. Archived from the original (PDF) on 27 September 2007.
- Mayr, Gerald (February 2005). "Tertiary plotopterids (Aves, Plotopteridae) and a novel hypothesis on the phylogenetic relationships of penguins (Spheniscidae)". Journal of Zoological Systematics and Evolutionary Research. 43 (1): 61–71. doi:10.1111/j.1439-0469.2004.00291.x.
- Murray, Bertram G. (1970). "A Redescription of Two Pliocene Cormorants". The Condor. 72 (3): 293–298. doi:10.2307/1366006. JSTOR 1366006.
- Orta, Jaume (1992): Family Phalacrocoracidae. In: del Hoyo, Josep; Elliott, Andrew & Sargatal, Jordi (eds.): Handbook of Birds of the World, Volume 1 (Ostrich to Ducks): 326–353, plates 22–23. Lynx Edicions, Barcelona. ISBN 84-87334-10-5
- Robertson, Connie (1998): Book of Humorous Quotations. Wordsworth Editions. ISBN 1-85326-759-7
- Siegel-Causey, Douglas (1988). "Phylogeny of the Phalacrocoracidae". The Condor. 90 (4): 885–905. doi:10.2307/1368846. JSTOR 1368846.
- Thevet, F. André (1558): About birds of Ascension Island. In: Les singularitez de la France Antarctique, autrement nommee Amerique, & de plusieurs terres & isles decouvertes de nostre temps: 39–40. Maurice de la Porte heirs, Paris.
- van Tets, G. F. (1976). "Australasia and the origin of shags and cormorants, Phalacrocoracidae". Proceedings of the XVI International Ornithological Congress: 121–124.
