= Cormorant culling =

Seabird culling by the fishing industry

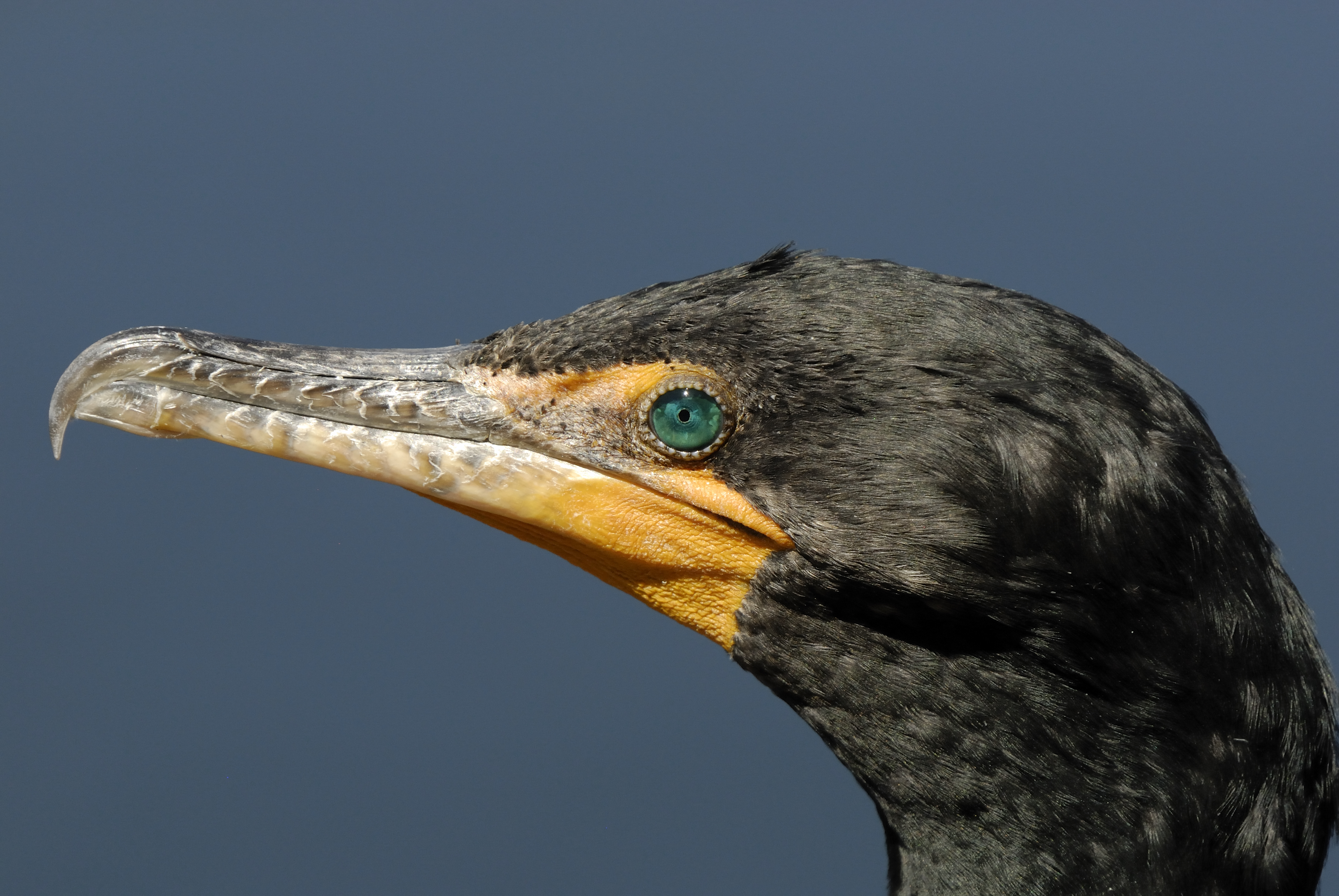
Double-crested cormorant

Cormorant culling is the intentional killing of cormorants by humans for the purposes of wildlife management. It has been practiced for centuries, with supporters of culling generally arising from the angling community. Culling techniques may involve the killing of birds, the destruction of eggs, or both. Historically, culls have occurred to protect the interests of recreational and commercial fishermen who perceive the animals to be competing with them for their intended catch or for the prey of their intended catch. Since the 1960s, the growing aquaculture industry has undertaken cormorant culls to protect its farmed fish and crustacean stocks. Opponents of cormorant culling include conservation groups such as the National Audubon Society, Cormorant Defenders International and Sea Shepherd.

== Target species ==
The target species are primarily the double-crested cormorant in North America and the great cormorant in Europe, Japan, and Australia. The little black cormorant has also been targeted in Australia. In Africa, the reed cormorant is targeted and shot.

=== Double-crested cormorant ===
Double-crested cormorant

Before Europeans became a major presence, double-crested cormorants lived throughout much of their current North American range, usually in populations far greater than 21st century observations. After birdwatching near Natchez, Mississippi in December 1820, John James Audubon reported:

“We saw to day probably Millions of those . . . Cormorants, flying Southwest—they flew in Single Lines for several Hours extremely high.”

No comparable numbers of the birds can be seen today.

After a protracted period of cormorant population reduction due to expanding human settlement, breeding habitat loss, and persecution in the forms of shooting and egging, a turning point for the species was reached in 1972. The National Audubon Society listed the double-crested cormorant as a species of special concern. The state of Wisconsin declared cormorants endangered and began building nesting structures to help them return. The use of DDT, a chemical agent which was proven to thin cormorant eggs and had impacted recruitment since its introduction following World War II, was banned. Congress also signed a revised Migratory Bird Treaty Act granting cormorants federal protection. Since that time, the species has been recovering.

Catfish and baitfish aquaculture have grown rapidly since the 1960s, particularly in the south-eastern United States. Open aquaculture ponds provide winter or year-round homes and food for cormorants on the species' long-established migration route. This has also led to conflict and prompted culling at aquaculture facilities. Cormorants’ effect on the aquaculture industry is significant, with a dense flock capable of consuming a harvest. Cormorants are estimated to cost the catfish industry in Mississippi alone between $10 million and $25 million annually.

The double-crested cormorant is the only species appreciably found inland in the United States.

== Methods ==
=== Shooting ===
Shooting is the most commonly employed and immediately effective method of cormorant culling. Sharpshooters are sometimes hired to undertake the work (Shiga prefecture, Japan) and in some jurisdictions, hunters are issued permits to allow them to kill these otherwise protected birds (South Carolina, United States). Birds can be shot on the water, on the wing, or at their breeding sites.

=== Egg smothering ===
The smothering of eggs with food-grade corn oil is another method employed by authorized persons. Once applied, the eggs' porous surface, which allows the transport of oxygen, becomes clogged with oil. The parent birds continue to incubate the oiled eggs, which ultimately fail to hatch.

== Culling by region ==
Cormorant culling has occurred in many countries including Australia, the United Kingdom, Germany, Estonia, Japan, the United States and Canada.

=== Australia ===
The culling of cormorants occurred in Australia from the 1900s to the 1960s for the purposes of reducing competition with recreational and commercial fisheries. In some cases, bounties were offered as incentives to encourage people to hunt the birds. Primary target species included the little black cormorant and great cormorant.

==== New South Wales ====
In New South Wales, a bounty was in place for a number of years prior to 1919. It was discontinued as inland cormorant populations continued to be replenished via migration and it was proven to be ineffective in preventing fish losses. During the bounty period approximately 44,000 cormorants were killed.

==== Queensland ====
Since the development of the aquaculture industry, cormorants have been responsible for some stock losses including at commercial prawn farms. In Bowen, Queensland, the use of non-lethal methods to deter the animals from settling on farm ponds and feeding on farmed prawns has been adopted in favor of culling.

==== South Australia ====
In April 1905, the South Australian government inaugurated a bounty of 1d per head of cormorant or freshwater turtle. Prior to May 1908, 25,537 cormorant heads were paid for, and 89,333 turtles. Most of the cormorants came from Kangaroo Island and Franklin Harbor rookeries and the turtles were caught in the Murray River and its lakes.

In the year 1909–1910, 3183 cormorants were destroyed in South Australia, with bounties paid for their heads. During the same period, 18,706 turtles were also culled as both animals were considered 'enemies' of fish. The total combined bounty paid was £91 4/.

Opponents of the cull argued that cormorants were responsible for keeping toadfish and leatherjacket numbers in check on Kangaroo Island, and that these fish, feeding on the larvae of other fish, likely had a greater impact on reducing quantities of preferred target species than the cormorants' own fishing practices. They argued that the animals should be protected, not hunted.

==== Tasmania ====
In Tasmania in 1954 a bounty on the heads of cormorants was proposed at 5/ per head. The proposal was supported by anglers, who expressed their concern at the animal's impact on trout populations inland. The bounty was raised from 3/6 to 5/- to encourage people to hunt the birds. Tasmania's Northern Fisheries Association responded by planning a special 'black cormorant day' of hunting.

=== Canada ===
In New Brunswick, cormorants are classified as a varmints. As such, holders of a varmint hunting license can kill them in unlimited numbers between early March and late September each year.

In Ontario, regular culls controlled cormorant populations until the 1940s, and by the 1950s, few remained. From 1973 to 1991, cormorant numbers increased over 300-fold. In Toronto, as cormorant populations spread from Tommy Thompson Park to the Toronto Islands in the 2020s, pressure from residents and visitors to the islands has increased to cull the urban population, but they are protected by both local firearm bylaws and Toronto and Region Conservation Authority's management strategy.

On Middle Island in Lake Erie, the double-crested cormorant population has been actively managed by the Canadian government with annual culling seasons since 2008. The first three breeding pairs were seen on the island in 1987, and over the following twenty years their population increased to over 5,000 pairs. In 1998, a group of fishing guides undertook an unauthorized cull, shooting cormorants on Little Galloo Island in Lake Ontario. Estimates of the scale of the cull range from 800 to 2000 birds. Eventually the perpetrators were brought to justice. Nonetheless, as of 2014, increasing pressure on the island and lake's other species via competition, habitat alteration and predation has created the case for culling as a management strategy.

=== Japan ===
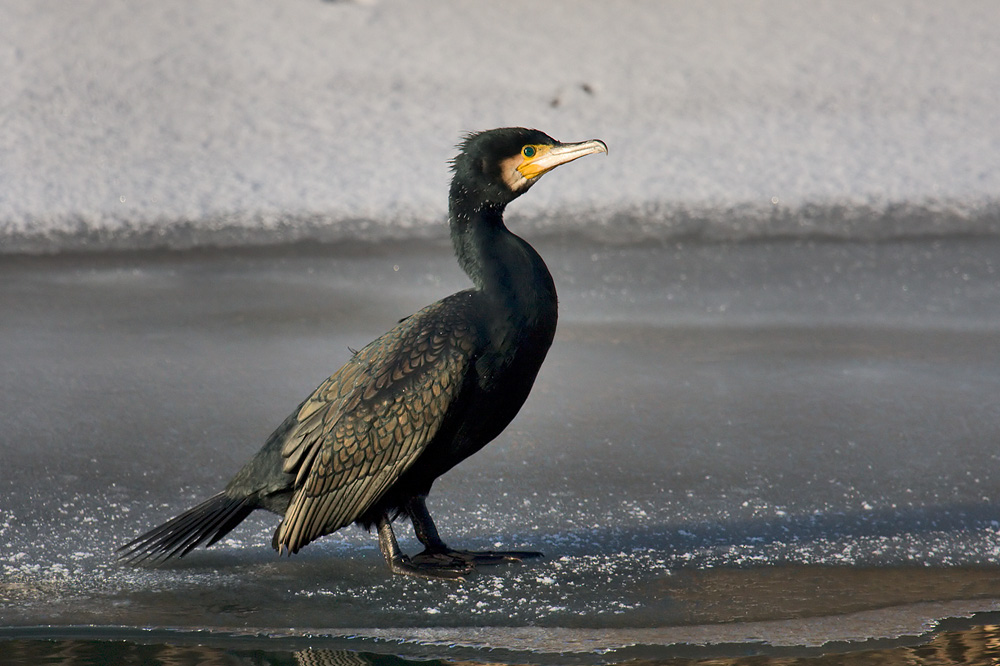
Great cormorant

In 2013, the Japanese population of great cormorants, Phalacrocorax carbo, was estimated to be over 100,000 birds. Conflict between increasing great cormorant populations and the ayu (or ayu sweetfish Plecoglossus altivelis) has led the Japanese government to implement cormorant culling. The ayu is one of the most popular species for commercial and recreational fisheries in Japan.

In Shiga prefecture, great cormorants have been responsible for impacts to forests (through alteration of habitat and guano deposition) and fisheries (through predation). At the Lake Biwa rookeries, between 10,000 and 25,000 cormorants were shot annually between the years 2004 and 2012 (with the exception of 2008, during which no birds were shot). Since 2009, sharpshooters have been employed by the government to undertake the culling, replacing hunters.

=== United Kingdom ===
In 2010, 2000 cormorants were culled in the United Kingdom under special licences according to the Royal Society for the Protection of Birds. The animals have been protected from arbitrary killing in the UK since 1981. A cull for environmental protection purposes is underway at Haweswater, United Kingdom where cormorants are killed for the protection of schelly, an endangered whitefish species.

=== United States ===
In thirteen states of the United States, aquaculture producers may shoot cormorants which feed on their stock in private ponds. They may also call upon government wildlife managers to shoot birds found roosting nearby. Local managers in twenty-four states are allowed to suffocate cormorant eggs with oil, destroy their nests, or kill cormorants that threaten public resources, such as wild fish, plants, and other birds’ nesting areas.

Individuals and states are permitted to kill a total of 160,000 cormorants each year. An average of about 40,000 cormorants are reported killed each year—perhaps amounting to 2 percent of North America's population. The kill statistics do not include the tens of thousands of eggs oiled annually.

In 2000, an unauthorized cull was undertaken on Little Charity Island in Saginaw Bay, Michigan that killed more than 500 cormorants. Despite lacking the required permits to kill the protected species, the perpetrators were not brought to justice.

In the span of one month, commencing in February 2014, hunters culled 11,653 double-crested cormorants during a licensed action in South Carolina. 1,225 permits were issued to hunters to kill cormorants during this period. One hunter alone reported killing 278 birds. Similar hunts occurred in Indiana, Michigan, Minnesota, New York, Ohio, Vermont, and Wisconsin in 2013, resulting in a combined total cull of 21,312 cormorants. The culling was unsuccessfully opposed by the Audubon Society.

A cull of 16,000 double-crested cormorants along the Columbia River in Oregon has been proposed to commence in 2015 and is intended to reduce pressure on salmon stocks.

== Environmental impacts ==
The long-term ecological effects of cormorant culling are uncertain and disputed. Cormorant numbers are effectively reduced during culls, but the targeted species remain in recovery after centuries of arbitrary killing and habitat loss. A paucity of dietary studies also means that the impact cormorants have on commercially important species (with the exception of pond-based aquaculture) are difficult to estimate. One unintended consequence of cormorant culling is that managers who enter nesting grounds to cull or oil eggs may cause more harm to other bird species in the process than the nesting cormorants do themselves.

== Alternatives to culling ==
The primary justification for the culling of cormorants is to reduce pressure on wild or farmed fish populations. It has been suggested that humans have caused the damage to fisheries and aquatic ecosystems through overfishing, introduction of exotic species and pollution. It has been further suggested that money spent trying to manage cormorants could be better used in reducing coastal pollution, securing conservation land and marine preserves, and assisting aquaculture producers and fishermen to develop new bird conservation practices.
