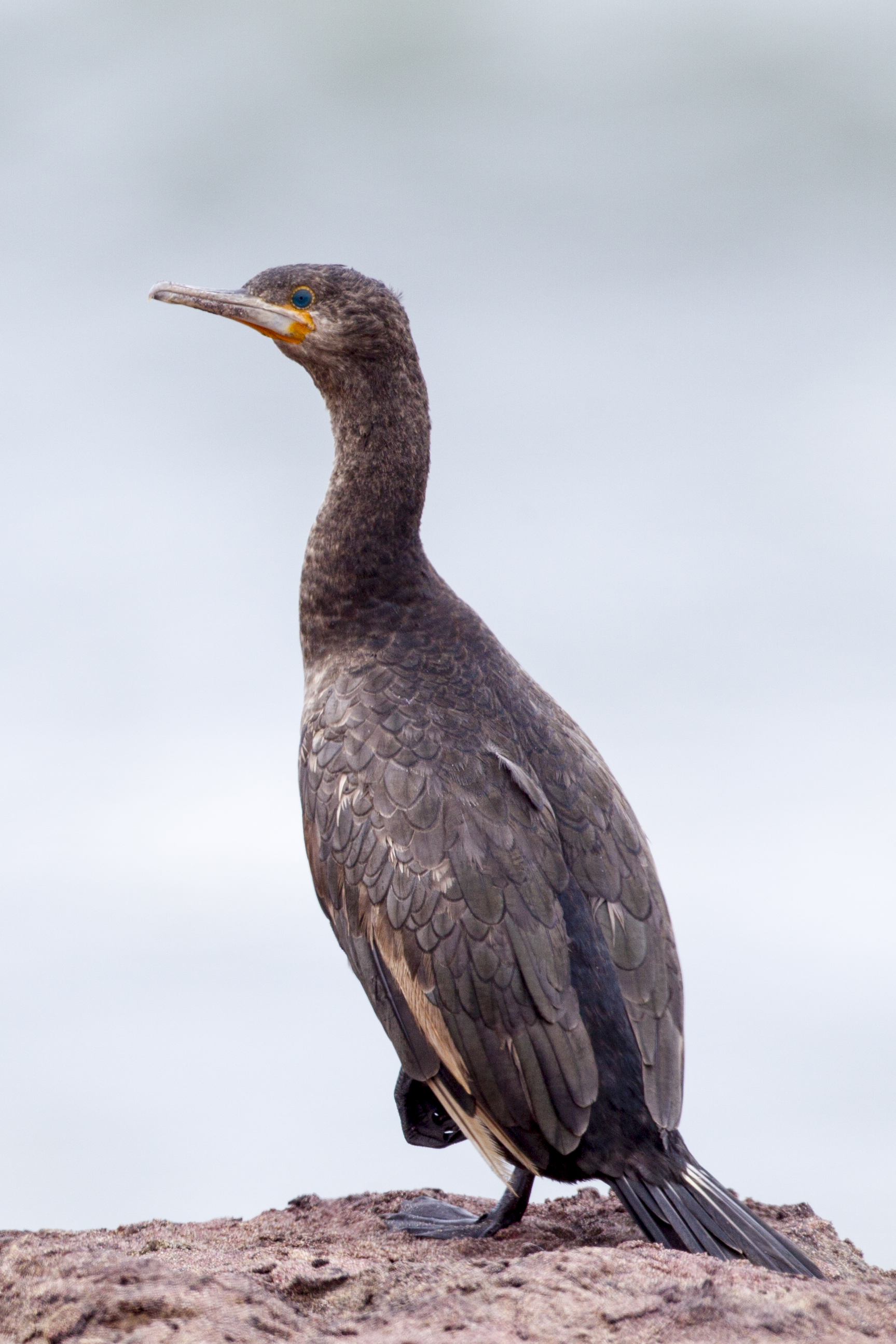
- Walvis Bay, Namibia

Conservation status
- Endangered (IUCN 3.1)

Scientific classification
- Kingdom: Animalia
- Phylum: Chordata
- Class: Aves
- Order: Suliformes
- Family: Phalacrocoracidae
- Genus: Phalacrocorax
- Species: P. capensis

Binomial name
- Phalacrocorax capensis (Sparrman, 1788)
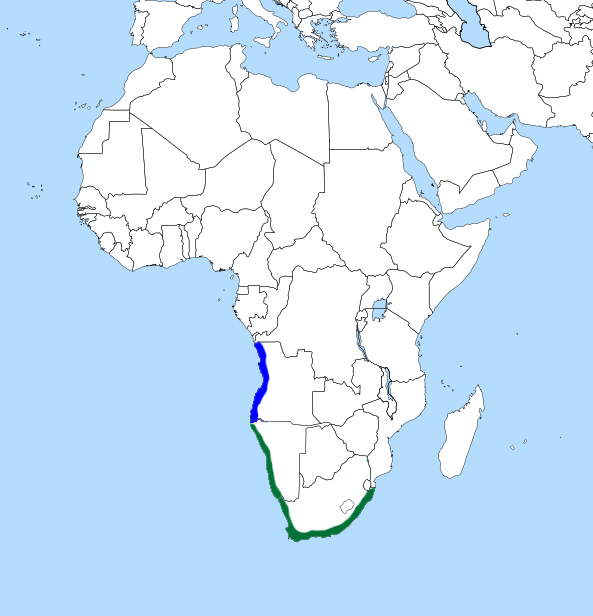

= Cape cormorant =

Species of bird

The Cape cormorant (Phalacrocorax capensis), also known as the Cape shag, is a member of the cormorant family. It is endemic to the southwestern coast of Africa, and classified as "Endangered" by the IUCN. The Cape cormorant is most closely related to the great cormorant and Japanese cormorant.

== Description ==
The Cape cormorant is a blue-black bird with a glossy shine. The entire body follows the same coloration. There is little to no sexual dimorphism, with both males and females measuring 61–64 cm and weighing 1.1-1.3 kg, along with a similar plumage. The beak is dark grey-black, and a deep yellow-orange gular pouch can be observed. The eyes are turquoise with a greenish eye-ring around them.

Both non-breeding and immature adults have duller plumage, with a brown throat for immature adults. Juveniles are browner than immature adults, with grey eyes and a black, white, or speckled gular pouch.

Males and females have a wingspan of around 260 mm. For breeding adults, the wings are bottle green.

== Taxonomy and systematics ==
The Cape cormorant is one of the 12 species in the genus Phalacrocorax, one of the 7 genera in the family Phalacrocoracidae. Phalacrocorax diverged from its sister genus, Urile (composed of North-Pacific cormorants) around 10 million years ago.

Within the genus Phalacrocorax, three sub-groups can be defined. The Cape cormorant is believed to share one of the sub-groups with the great cormorant and Japanese cormorant. However, the great and Japanese cormorants are much closely related to each other than to the Cape cormorant.

The taxonomic position of the Cape cormorant is disputed in the scientific literature. Some authorities place the Cape cormorant and other related cormorant species in the genus Leucocarbo, a group of Southern Hemisphere cormorants loosely characterized by their blue eyes.

== Habitat and distribution ==
=== Distribution ===
Cape cormorants have a non-breeding range extending from Lobito, Angola, to Maputo Bay, Mozambique. Their breeding range is smaller, reaching from Southern Angola to the Eastern Cape province of South Africa. Cape cormorants stay close to the Benguela Upwelling System, an area of high food availability.

There are around 57,000 breeding pairs of Cape cormorants in Namibia alone. However, overfishing in the Cape cormorant’s range has led to a shift in food sources. Anchovies, sardines, and rock lobster have all recently shifted south and east. Cape cormorants have a limited foraging range when breeding. As such, this resource shift has led to a strong decline in Cape cormorant numbers.

=== Habitat ===
Cape cormorants nest in colonies, in remote areas safe from predators such as the black-backed jackal and human disturbance. They benefit from man-made guano platforms off the coast of Namibia, established for economic purposes, as permanent roosting and nesting sites. Cape cormorants can also roost in large numbers on wide beaches, which reduces the risk of predation.

Other habitats for the Cape cormorant include coastal islands and rocks, lagoons, and coastal marine waters.

== Behavior and ecology ==
=== Vocalization ===
Vocalization in Cape cormorants is mostly used during the breeding season. Its use is significantly reduced, or even absent, during the non-breeding period. There are five vocalization variations in adults, and three in chicks.

Adult Cape cormorants have different vocalizations for flying, courtship, maintenance, feeding, and the presence of a threat. Both sexes emit the same vocalization in all cases, except for courtship. During courtship, males emit a repeated, low-pitch cluck. Females respond with a “gra-gra-gra-…”. Once the pair forms a bond, the male stops clucking and uses a voice similar to the female’s.

Cape cormorant chicks have different vocalizations for hatching, asking for food, and the presence of a threat.

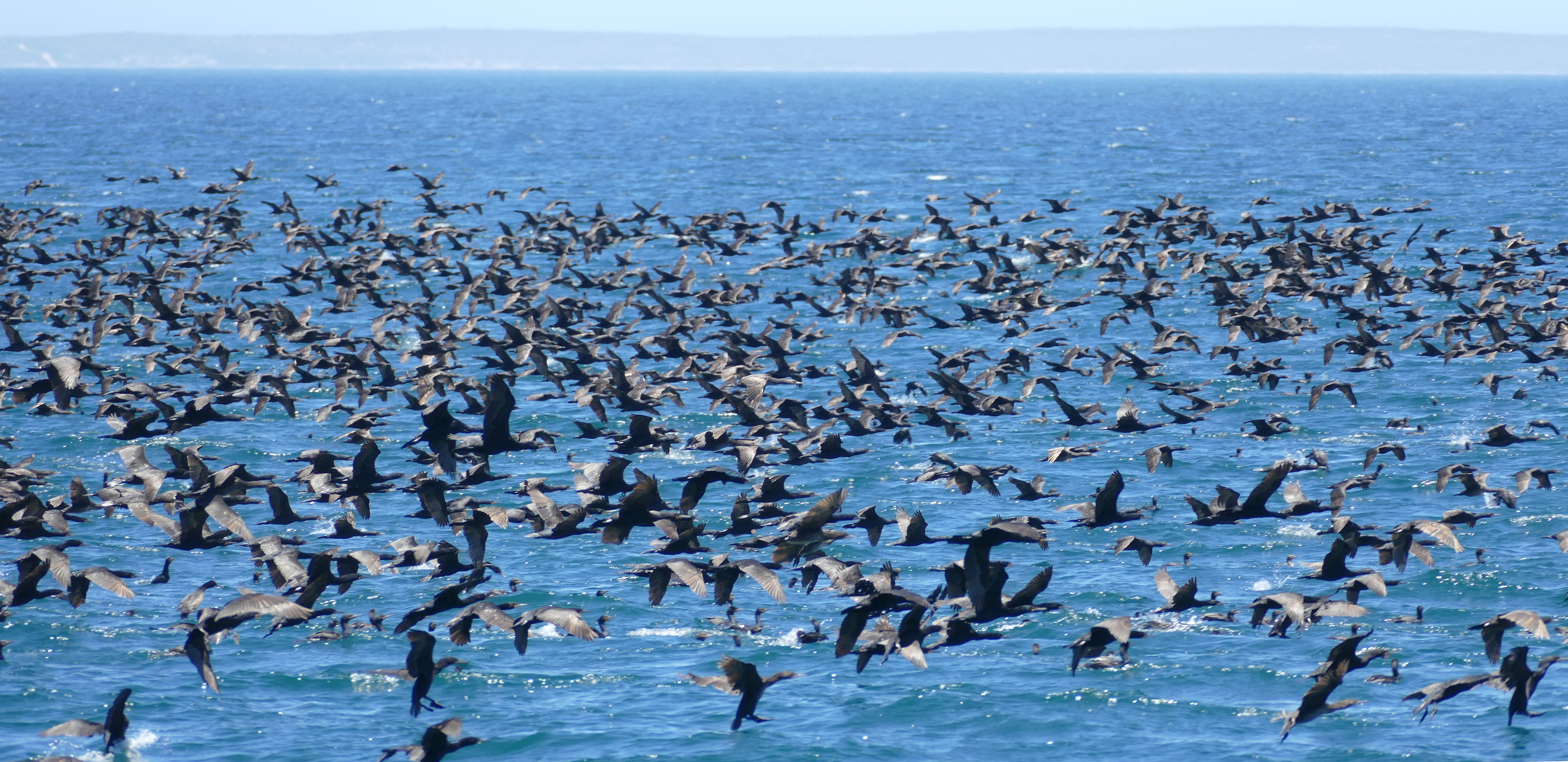
Cape cormorants foraging in a flock in Western Cape, South Africa

=== Diet ===
Cape cormorants commonly forage in flocks. Their most common prey are pelagic schooling fish, such as anchovies, pilchards, and mackerel. Cape cormorants are foot-propelled diving birds and can forage from 5m to 34m deep. They are one of the main pelagic fish predators in South Africa, along with the Cape gannet and the African penguin. However, their foraging ecology is relatively understudied in comparison to those two species.

The diving behavior of Cape cormorants is like most cormorants, with a foraging time of 5.5 hours per day, and dives lasting between 10 and 70 seconds. Cape cormorants stay close to their colonies while feeding, with most foraging occurring within 20 km.

=== Breeding ===
Cape cormorants usually breed in dense colonies in areas protected from terrestrial predators, such as islands, cliffs, and ledges. These colonies require a reliable source of pelagic fish to sustain breeding adults and their newborn chicks. The breeding season lasts from August to May, and peaks between October and February. Clutch size averages three eggs, ranging from one to five.

Mating is initiated through male courtship. Fights can occur between two males over nesting sites, which are used by males for courtship. Cape cormorants are monogamous, and both parents help in taking care of the eggs. A “pecking distance” is maintained between nests to avoid conflict with other cormorants.

Several factors influence reproduction rates. Cape cormorant breeding coincides with the seasonal availability of pelagic fish. When fish numbers decline, cormorant populations quickly follow and breed less by deferring their age at first breeding. An increase in fish populations causes the equivalent effect. Increased predation and outbreaks of avian cholera also play a role in Cape cormorant decline.

== Threats ==
=== Predators ===
The Cape cormorant’s main predator is the black-backed jackal. Jackals only represent a threat in open sandpits and beaches, since they cannot reach artificial guano platforms and remote coastal areas. Most Cape cormorants that fall as prey to black-backed jackals are sick, injured, or weak, making this interaction a healthy regulator for the Cape cormorant population.

On the artificial guano platforms, Cape cormorants are hunted by great white pelicans and great cormorants. These species target unsupervised chicks when the parents are temporarily away. Other studies show that Cape cormorant chicks are also hunted by kelp gulls and Cape fur seals.

=== Human-induced ===
The IUCN now classifies the Cape cormorant as "Endangered" due to a very rapid decline in the population over the last three generations. The number of breeding pairs has been shown to depend directly on the amount of food available, particularly anchovies and sardines. Food availability has varied a lot since the 2000s, potentially due to climate change warming the cold waters of the Benguela Upwelling System. Overfishing has also played its role in the decline of Cape cormorant populations. Sardine stocks recently collapsed in the northern part of the Cape cormorant’s range, leaving the seabird and other predators with fewer resources.

== Conservation ==
The main conservation efforts underway for Cape cormorants are the protection of breeding colonies, mainly on specific islands under the jurisdiction of South African National Parks. However, one of the major challenges Cape cormorants face is food availability, with prey populations collapsing in areas of the Benguela Upwelling System. Certain studies recommend a comprehensive assessment of cormorant populations and how prey populations affect their numbers.

The Namibian Ministry of Fisheries and Marine Resources has already committed to considering all elements of the ecosystem when managing fish populations. This includes predators such as the Cape cormorant, and the species’ survival will be an important reason to create quota limitations on industrial fishing, among other measures.

== Gallery ==
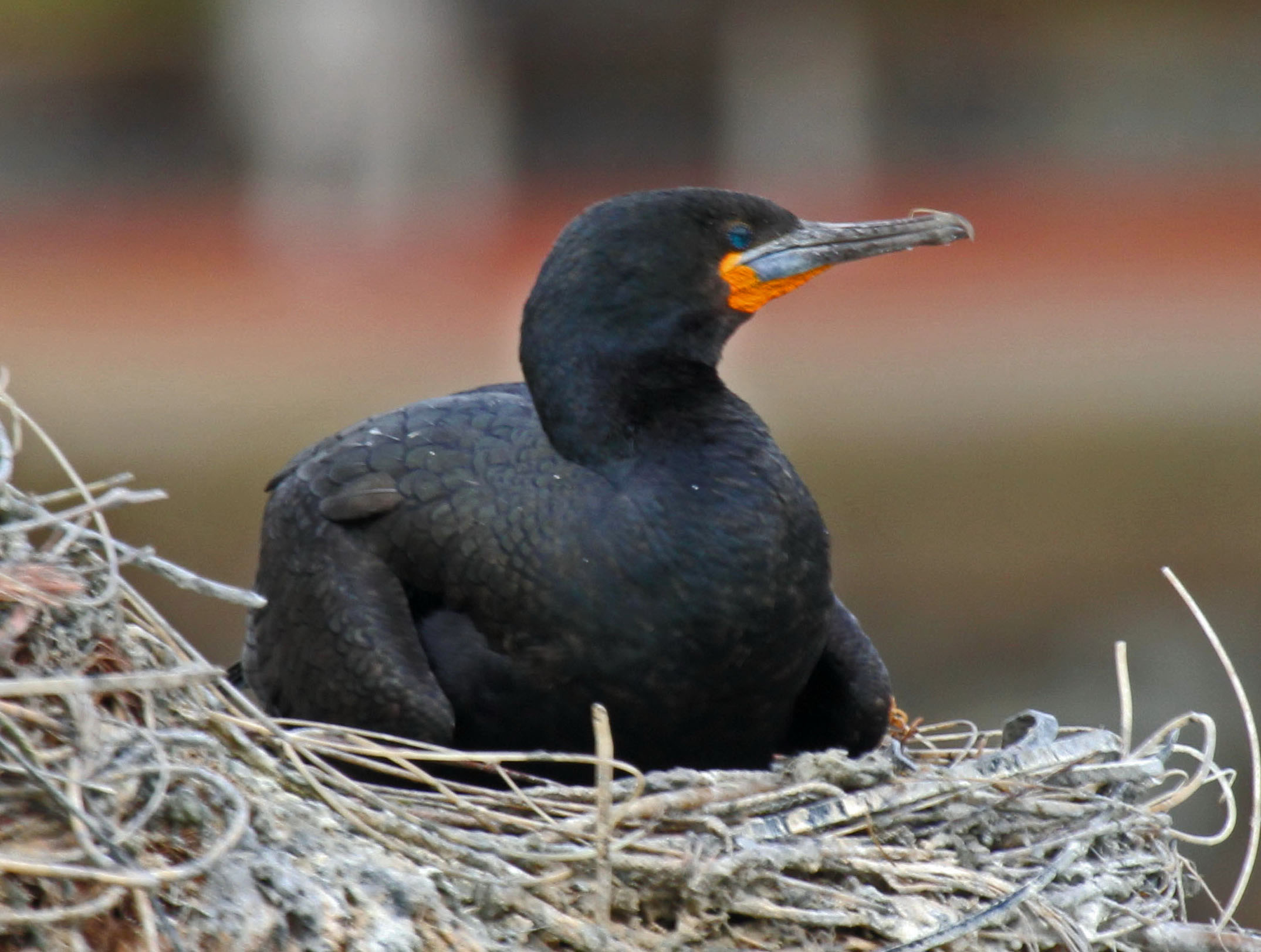
Nesting in Cape Town, South Africa

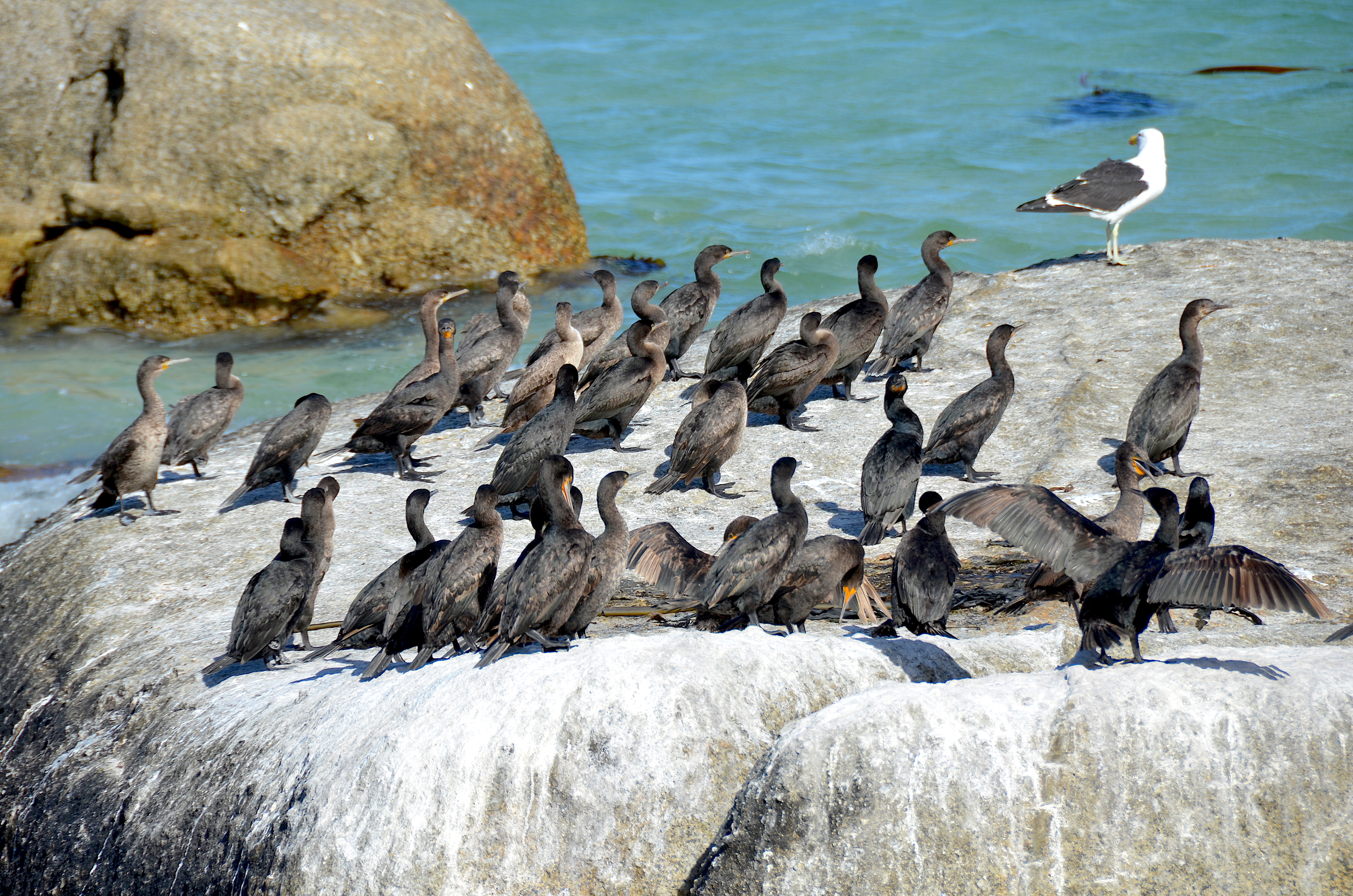
Roosting at Boulders Beach, South Africa

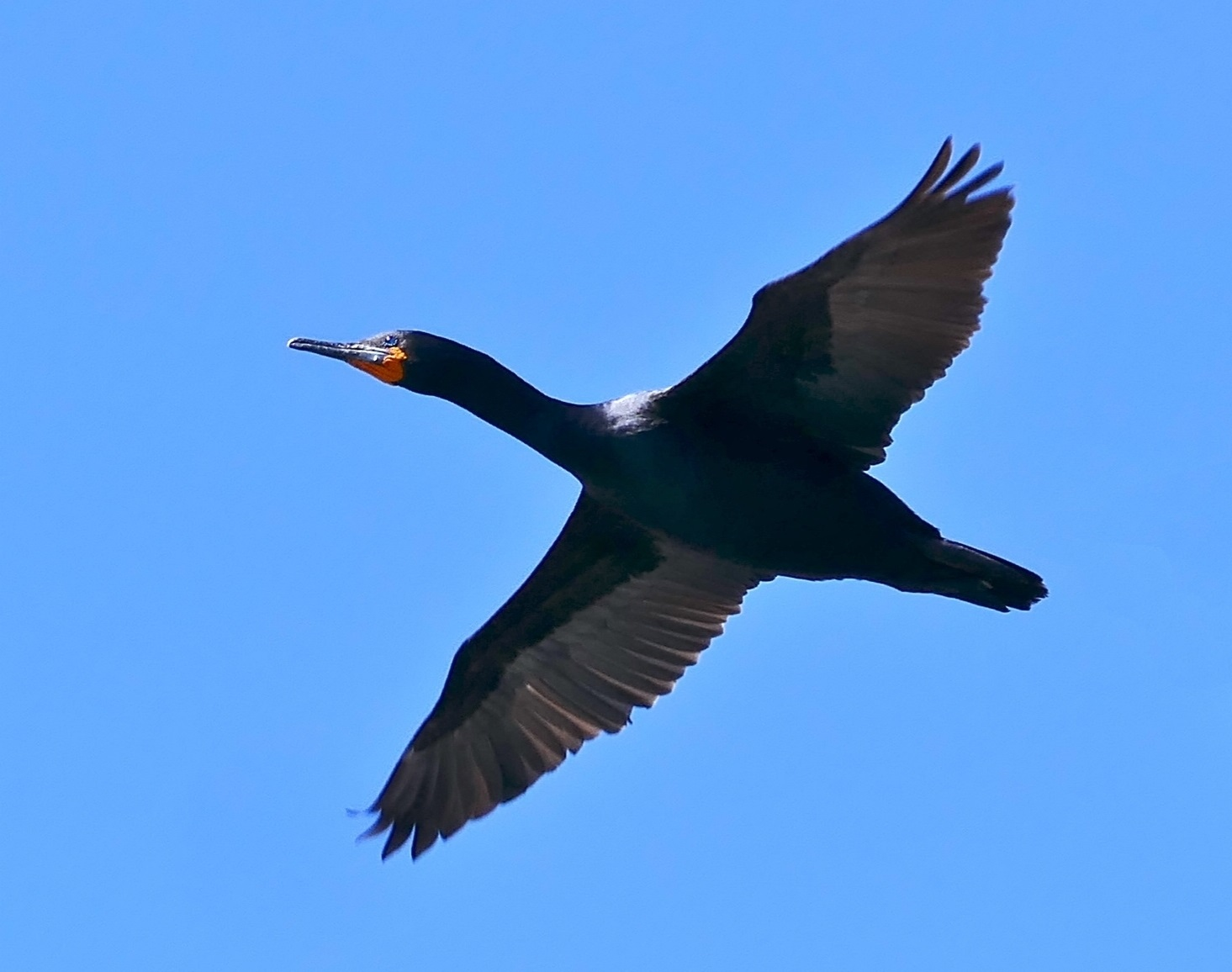
In flight over shoreline

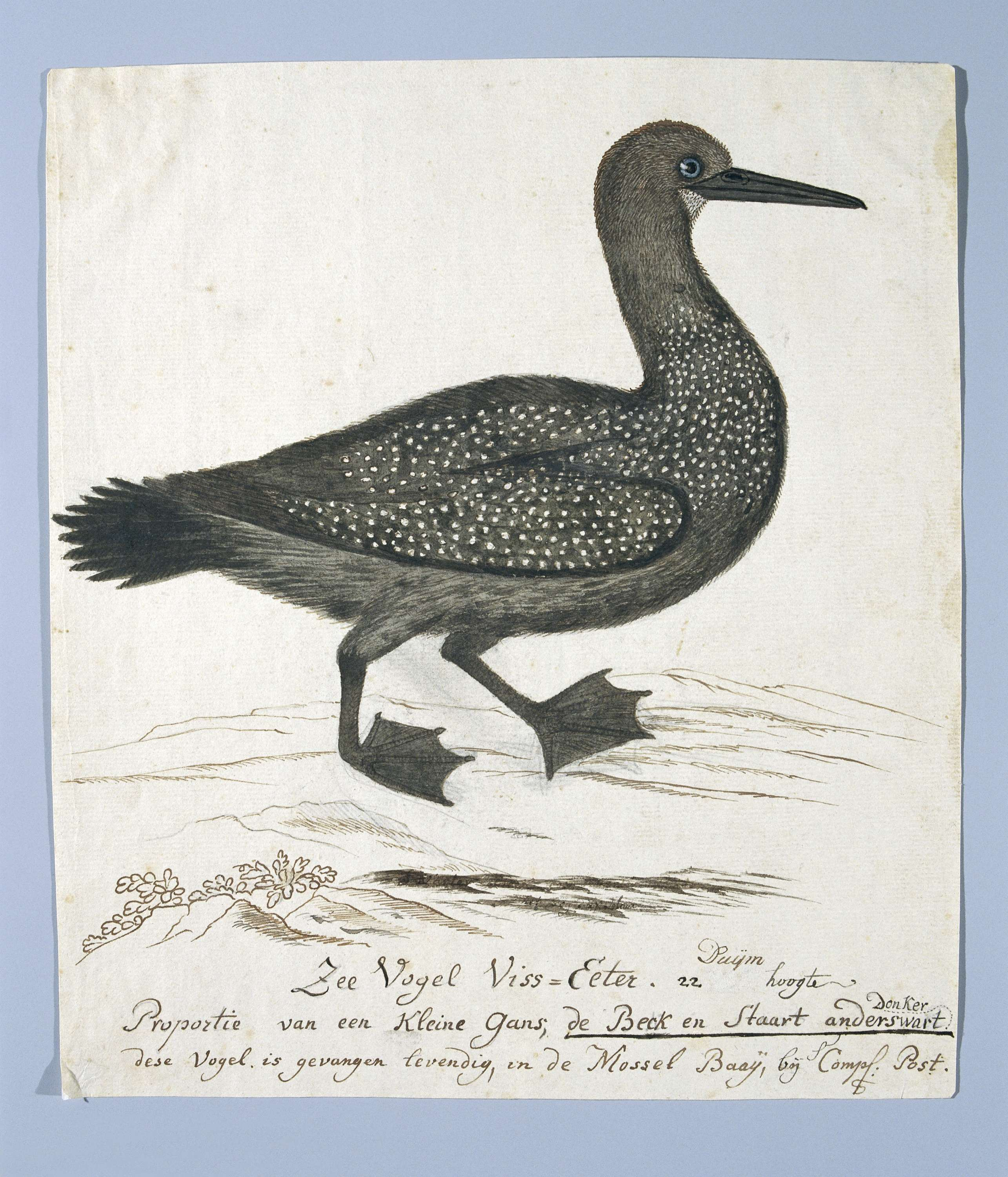
A drawing of a Cape cormorant by Robert Jacob Gordon (circa 1780)
