= Bird Island (Namibia) =

Artificial island in Namibia

Coordinates: 22.8786°S 14.5357°E

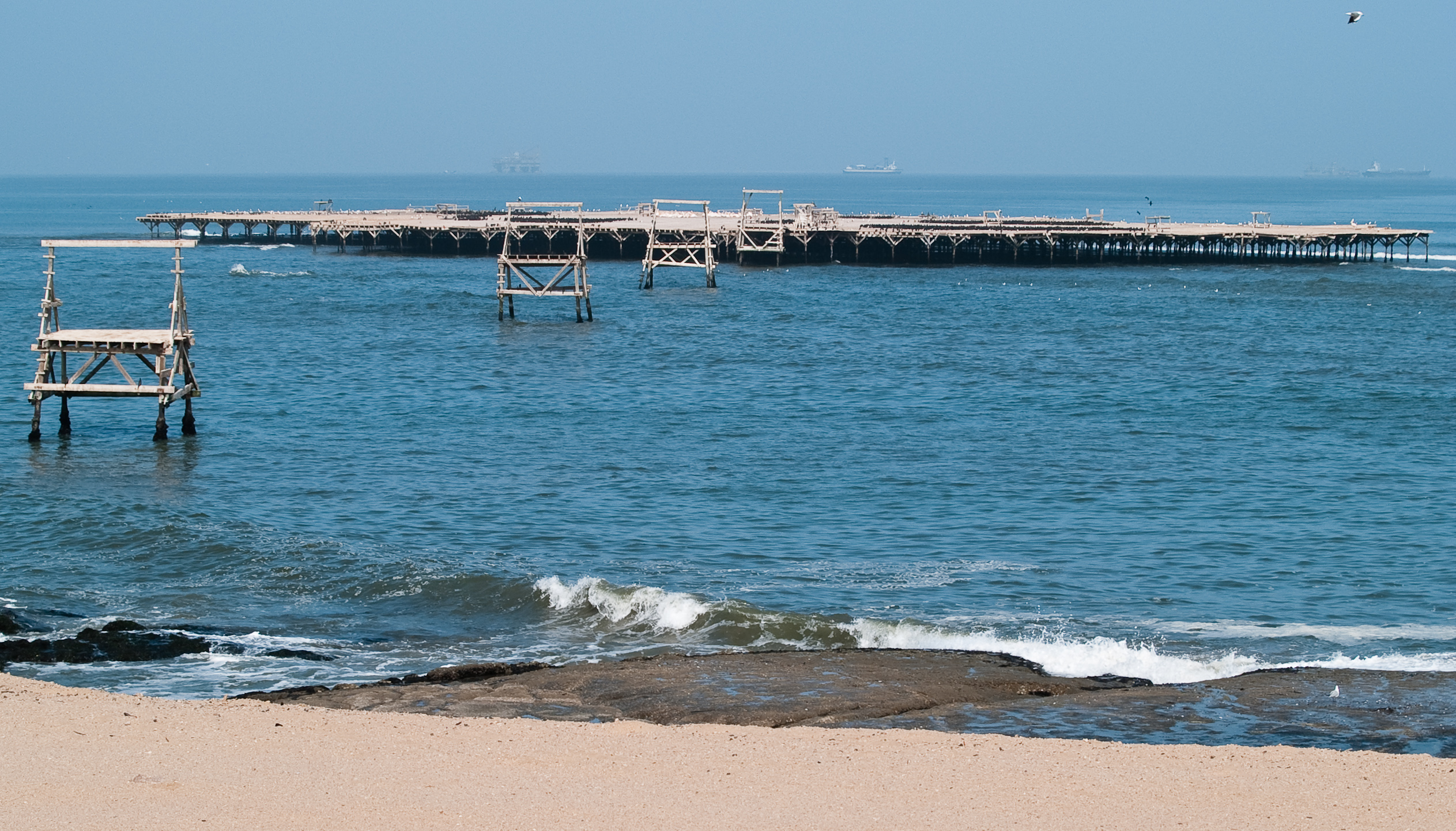
Bird Island as seen from the Namibian coast

Bird Island is a man-made platform off the coast of Namibia between Walvis Bay and Swakopmund. It serves as a breeding ground for birds (primarily Cape cormorants) and yields guano, which is collected and sold as fertilizer.

== History ==
Bird Island was conceived and constructed by Adolf Winter, a German who emigrated to South West Africa (now known as Namibia) in 1912. Winter took a train from Swakopmund to nearby Walvis Bay and saw a natural offshore formation called Bird Rock, covered in guano from many birds. On the return trip, he noticed the guano had been washed away by the sea and saw a business opportunity.

Bird Island began as a wooden platform measuring four meters square, standing three meters above the sea surface. Winter finished this initial construction in March 1930. One year later he had enlarged the platform to 16 meters square, and by August 1931 had extended it to 1600 square meters. Guano was collected and sold annually, and expansion of the platform continued at a slower pace until 1937, when a large shipment of timber allowed further expansion of the platform to its current size of 17,000 square meters.

== Economics ==
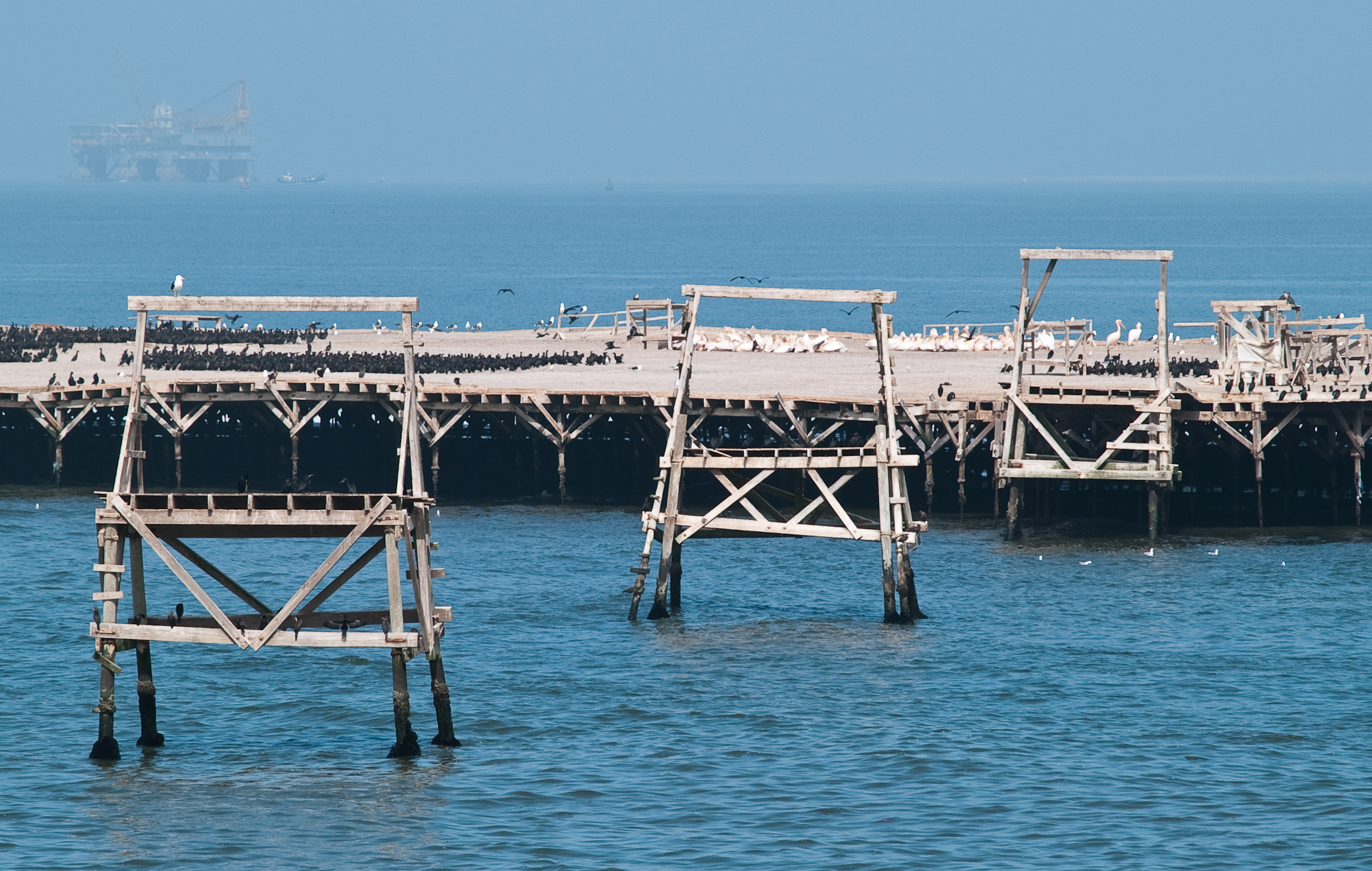
Arrangements for transporting guano to shore

The guano collected from Bird Island is considered high quality for its high nitrogen content relative to other guano collection facilities in the region. It is cleaned in Swakopmund to remove feathers and other debris, ground to a powder, and exported to Belgium for US$285 per ton. The platform yields approximately 650 tons of guano annually.
