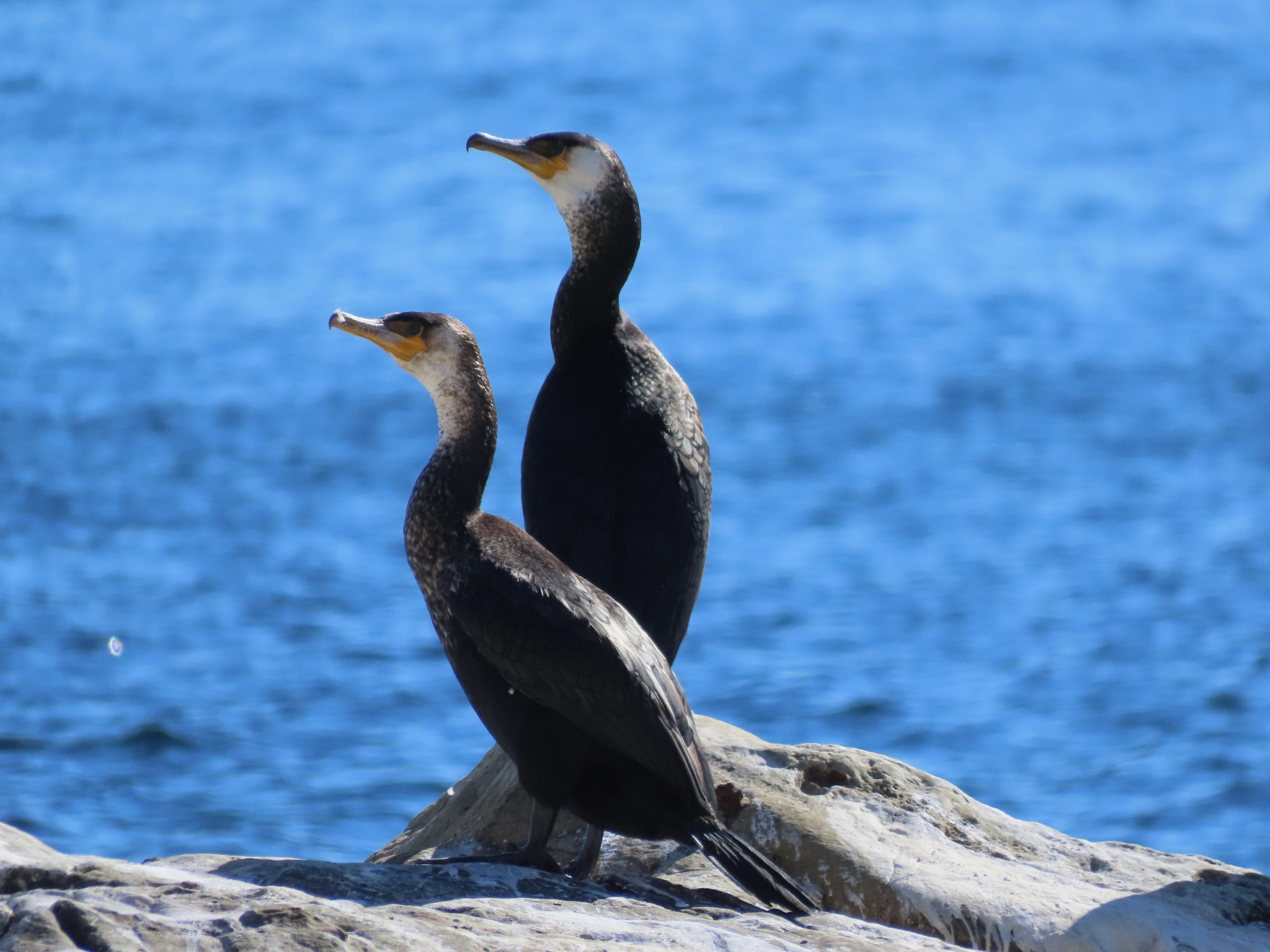

Conservation status
- Least Concern (IUCN 3.1)

Scientific classification
- Kingdom: Animalia
- Phylum: Chordata
- Class: Aves
- Order: Suliformes
- Family: Phalacrocoracidae
- Genus: Phalacrocorax
- Species: P. capillatus

Binomial name
- Phalacrocorax capillatus (Temminck & Schlegel, 1850)
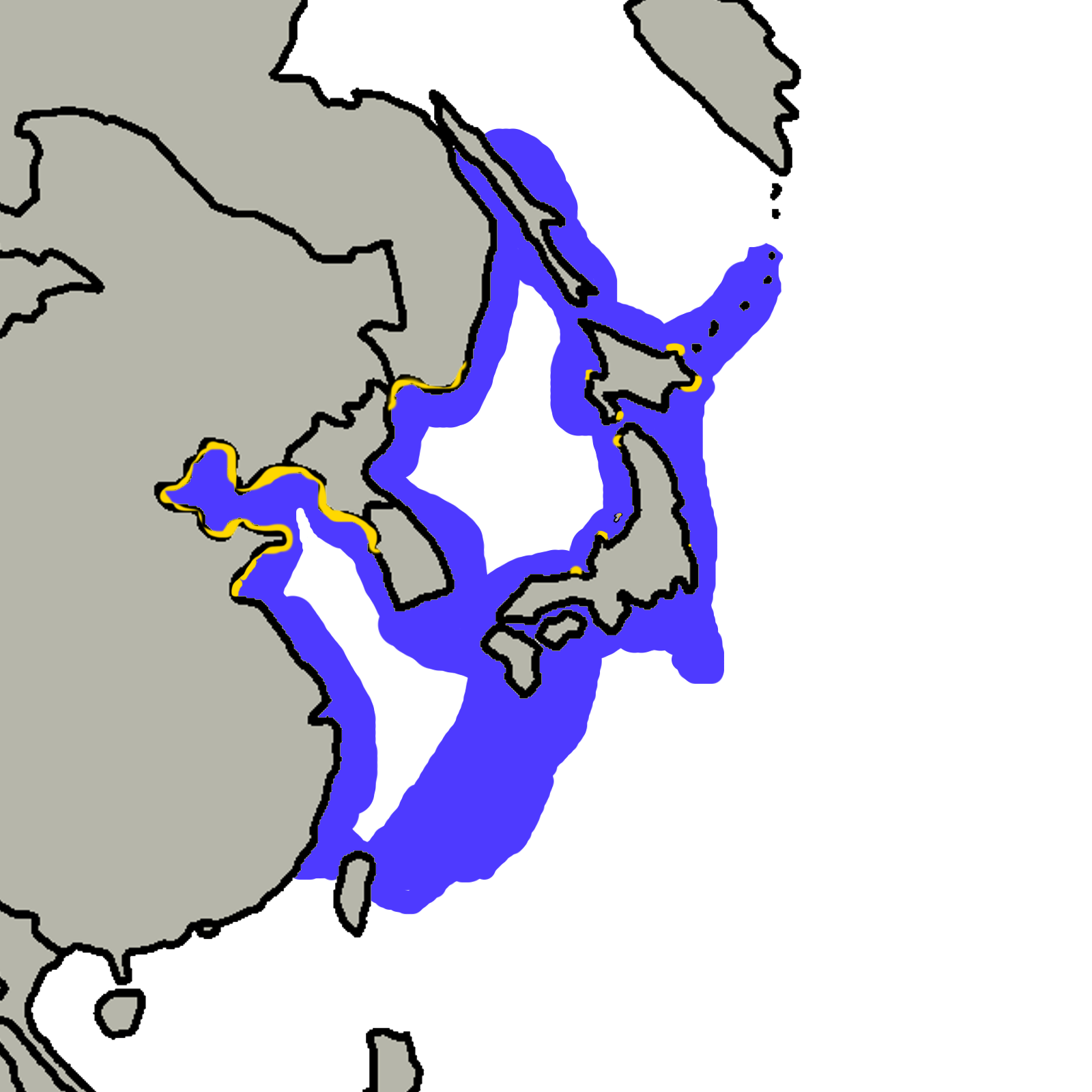
- Breeding range in orange, non-breeding range in blue

= Japanese cormorant =

Species of bird

The Japanese cormorant (Phalacrocorax capillatus), also known as Temminck's cormorant, is a species of cormorant native to coastal areas of the east Palearctic.

The species has a black body with a white throat and cheeks and a partially yellow bill. Juveniles are plainer and browner in appearance. It is one of the larger cormorants and is comparable in size to the great cormorant. Adults measure 81 to 92 cm (32 to 36 in) in length with a wingspan of around 152 cm (60 in), and may weigh 2.3 to 3.55 kg (5.1 to 7.8 lb).

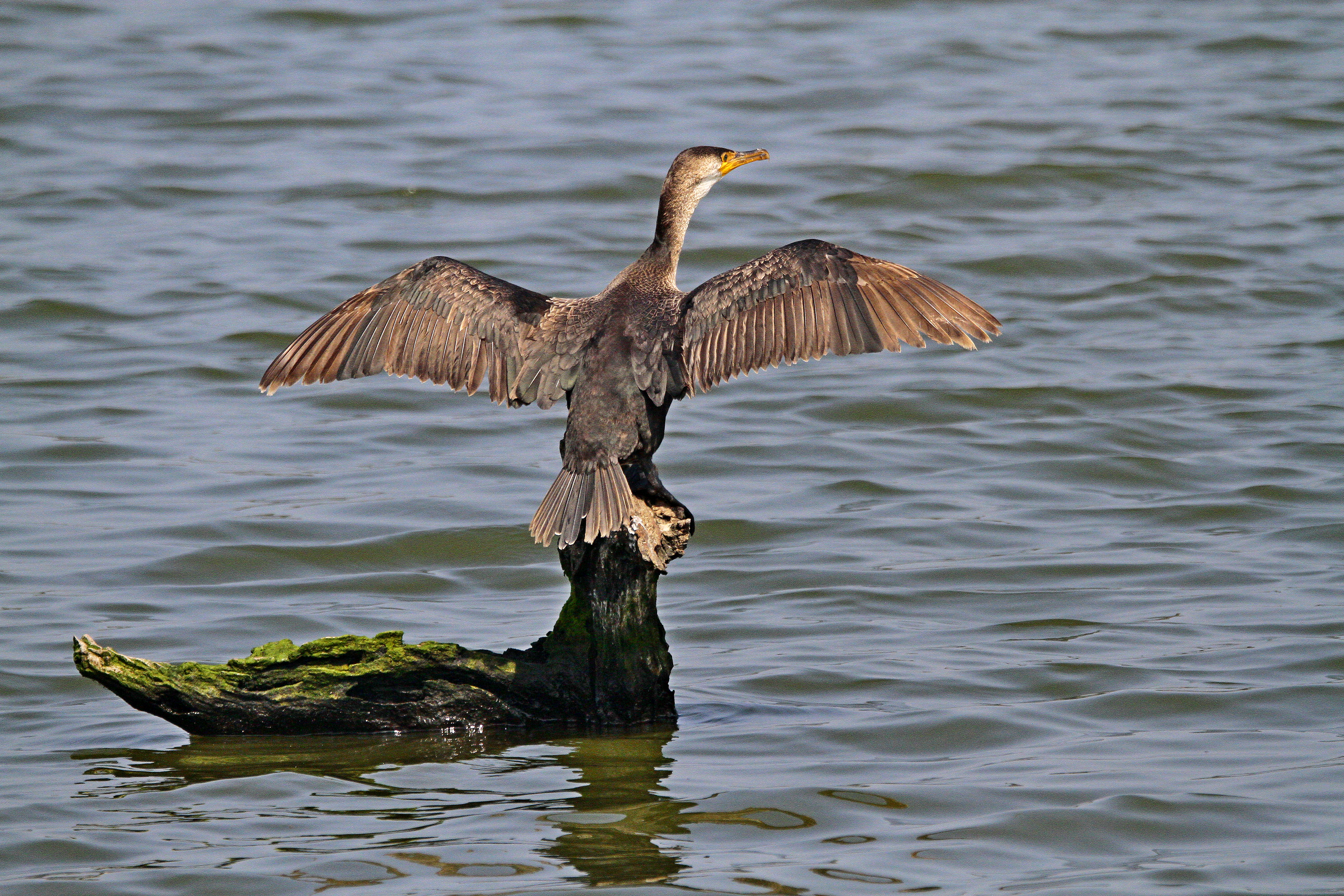
winter plumage

The Japanese cormorant is found along the coasts of East Asia, including China, Japan, North Korea, the Russian Far East, South Korea and Taiwan. It is migratory in parts of its range and feeds mainly on fish, which it catches by diving underwater.

It is one of the species of cormorant traditionally trained by fishermen in Japan for cormorant fishing, a practice known as ukai (鵜飼). In Japanese, the species is known as umiu (ウミウ; "sea cormorant"). The fishing masters of the Nagara River traditionally use this species to catch ayu.

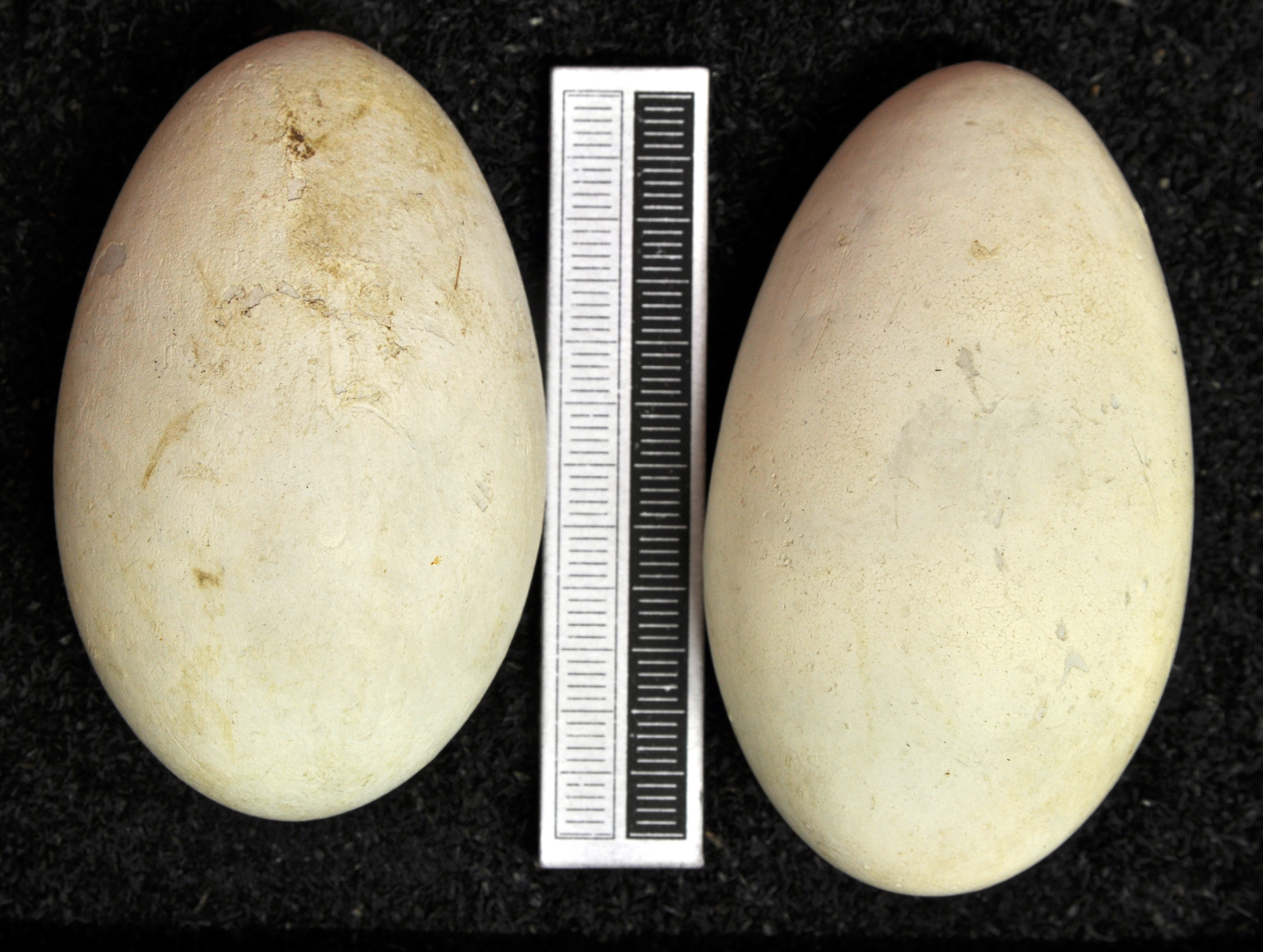
Eggs in the collection of the Museum Wiesbaden
