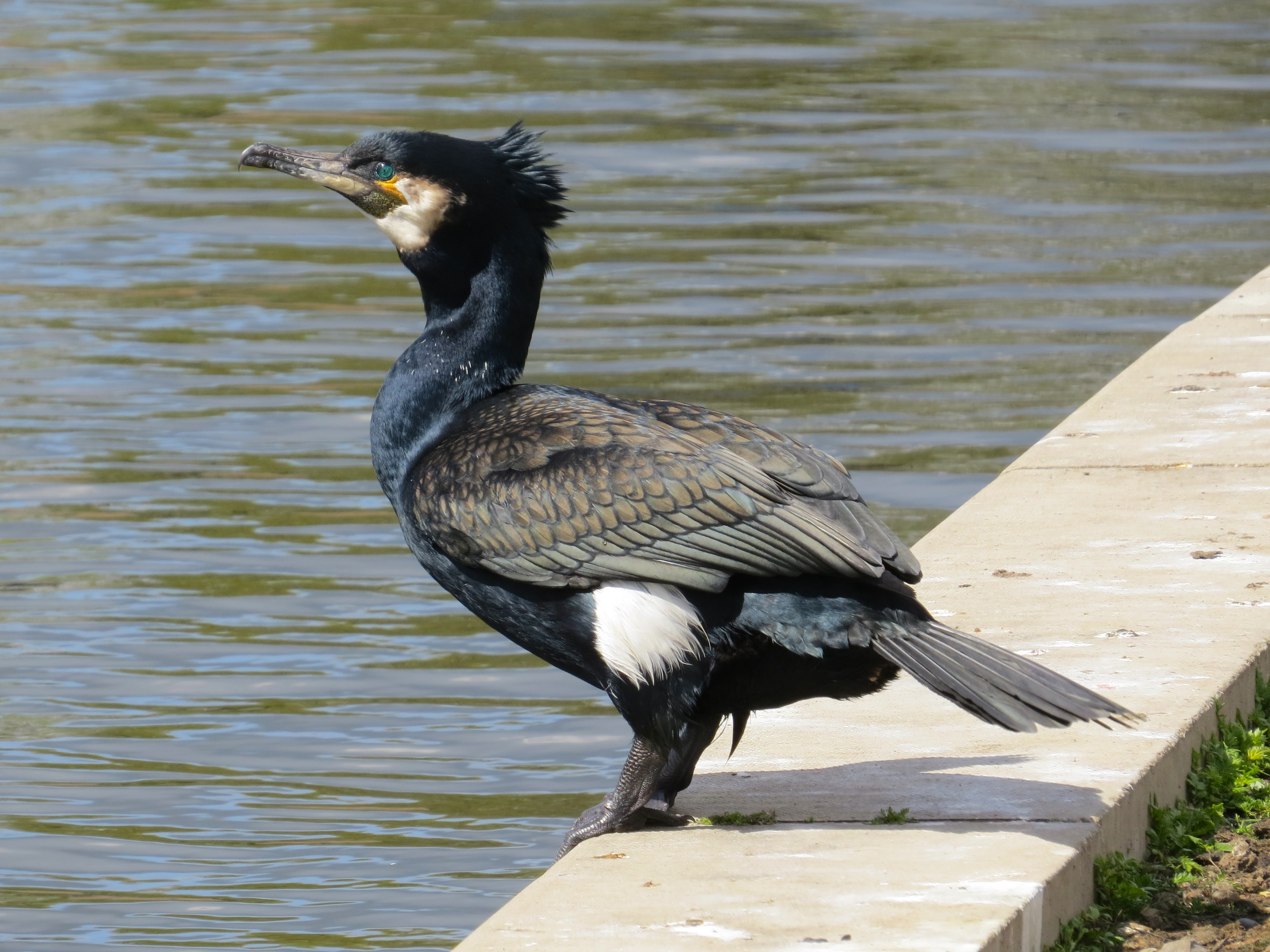
- Nominate P. c. carbo, Northumberland, UK

Conservation status
- Least Concern (IUCN 3.1)

Scientific classification
- Kingdom: Animalia
- Phylum: Chordata
- Class: Aves
- Order: Suliformes
- Family: Phalacrocoracidae
- Genus: Phalacrocorax
- Species: P. carbo

Binomial name
- Phalacrocorax carbo (Linnaeus, 1758)
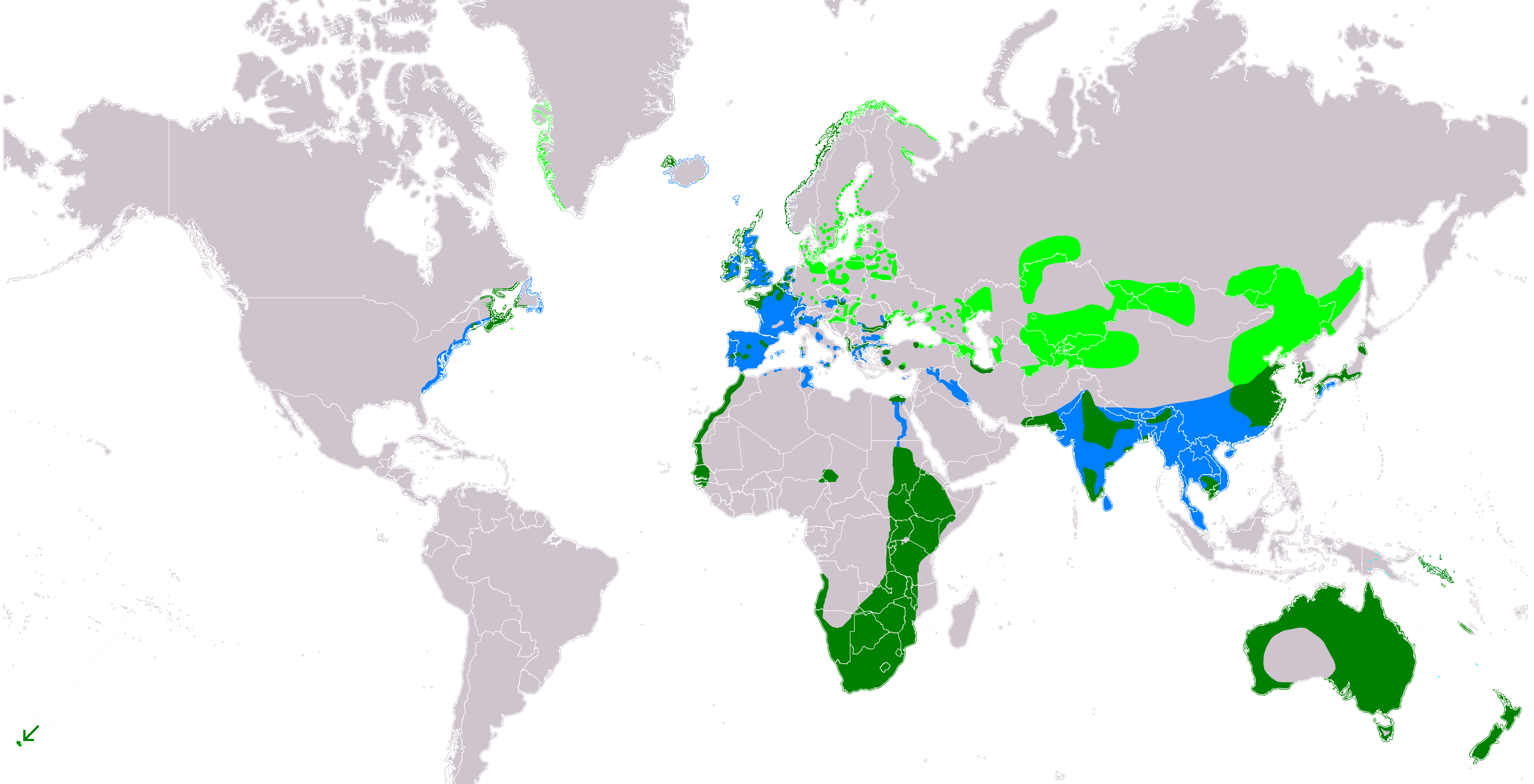
- Range of P. carbo Breeding Resident Passage Non-breeding

Synonyms
- Pelecanus carbo Linnaeus, 1758

= Great cormorant =

Species of bird

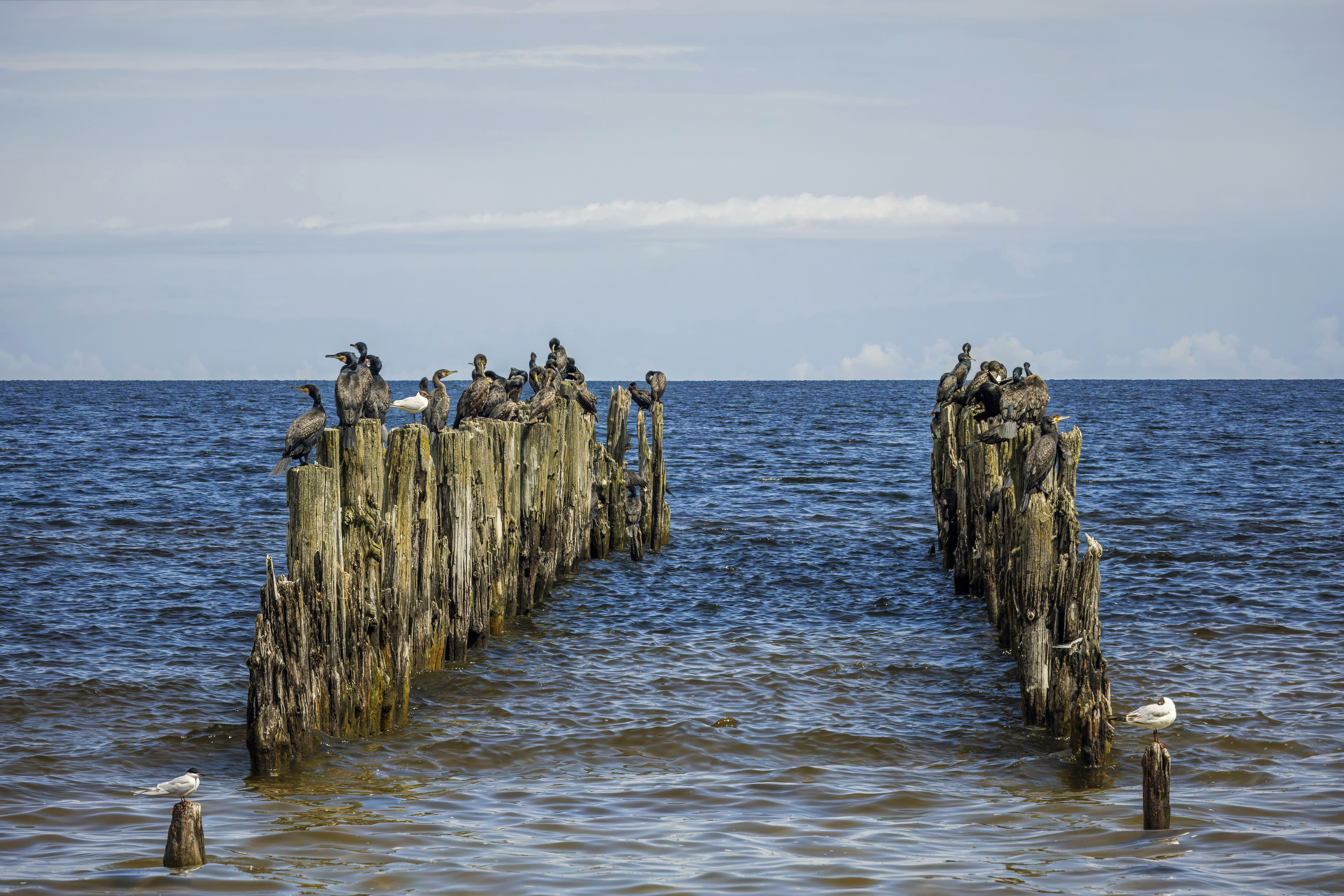
Group of great cormorants in Latvia

The great cormorant (Phalacrocorax carbo), also known as just cormorant in Britain, as black shag or kawau in New Zealand, formerly also known as the great black cormorant across the Northern Hemisphere, the black cormorant in Australia, and the large cormorant in India, is a widespread member of the cormorant family of seabirds. It breeds in much of the Old World, Australasia, and the Atlantic coast of North America.

== Taxonomy ==
The great cormorant was formally described in 1758 by the Swedish naturalist Carl Linnaeus in the tenth edition of his Systema Naturae under the binomial name Pelecanus carbo. Linnaeus specified the type location as "Europe", but this was restricted to the "rock-nesting form of the north Atlantic Ocean" by the German ornithologist Ernst Hartert in 1920. The great cormorant is now one of 12 species placed in the genus Phalacrocorax that was introduced in 1760 by the French zoologist Mathurin Jacques Brisson. The genus name is Latinised Ancient Greek, from φαλακρός (phalakros, "bald") and κόραξ (korax, "raven"); the specific epithet carbo is Latin for "charcoal".

=== Subspecies ===
Six subspecies are accepted. These are listed below with their breeding ranges. An additional species, the Japanese cormorant Phalacrocorax capillatus, is very closely related, with genetic evidence suggesting it may be embedded within P. carbo; it is shown in the list below for completeness.

| Image | Scientific name | Common name | Distribution | Notes |
|---|---|---|---|---|
| Northumberland, UK | P. c. carbo (Linnaeus, 1758) | Atlantic cormorant | North Atlantic coasts from NW France, Britain, Ireland, western Norway, west Greenland, and east Canada to Maine (northeast USA), wintering south to north Florida; formerly also the Baltic Sea | Described by Linnaeus from Sweden in 1758, but extirpated there soon after; subsequent recolonisation of the area has been by P. c. sinensis |
| Gojal, Gilgit-Baltistan, Pakistan | P. c. sinensis (Staunton, 1796) syn. P. c. subcormoranus (C. L. Brehm, 1824) | Continental cormorant large cormorant (India) | Transcontinental across Eurasia from inland western Europe to India and Sri Lanka, to northeast Russia, northeast China and the Korean Peninsula, south to Turkey, central Asia and north Mongolia; also disjunct in central south Cambodia and south Vietnam, northeast Borneo | Spreading north and west; now overlaps and interbreeds with P. c. carbo in at least southeast England, northern France, the Netherlands, and Scandinavia |
| Osaka, Japan | P. c. hanedae Kuroda & Nm, 1925 | Japanese great cormorant | coastal and inland Japan, Hokkaido to Kyushu (north to south Japan) | Ecologically separated from P. capillatus, less strictly marine, often inland |
| Souss-Massa National Park, Morocco | P. c. maroccanus Hartert, EJO, 1906 | Moroccan cormorant | coastal northwest Africa: Morocco to Mauretania | white neck and upper breast |
| Lake Naivasha, Kenya | P. c. lucidus Lichtenstein, MHC, 1823 | White-breasted cormorant | sub-Saharan Africa | white neck and breast |
| Victoria, Australia | P. c. novaehollandiae Stephens, 1826 | black cormorant (Australia) black shag (New Zealand), kawau (New Zealand, Māori name) | inland and coastal Australasia: Australia, North Island, South Island, Stewart Island and Chatham Islands (east of South Island; New Zealand), Rennell Island (south Solomon Islands) and Grande Terre (New Caledonia) | Syntype in the collection of the Museum of New Zealand Te Papa Tongarewa. |
| Aichi prefecture, Japan | P. capillatus (Temminck & Schlegel, 1850) | Japanese cormorant | coastal Japan Hokkaido to Kyushu, Sakhalin, southeast Russia, Korea | Ecologically separated from P. c. hanedae, more strictly marine, rarely inland |

== Description ==
The great cormorant is a large bird, but there is a wide variation in size in the species' wide range. Weight is reported to vary from 1.5 kg (3 lb 5 oz) to 5.3 kg (11 lb 11 oz). Males are typically larger and heavier than females, with the nominate race P. c. carbo averaging about 10% larger in linear measurements than the smaller subspecies P. c. sinensis. The lightest average weights cited are in Germany (P. c. sinensis), where 36 males averaged 2.28 kg (5 lb 1/2 oz) and 17 females averaged 1.94 kg (4 lb 4 1/2 oz). The highest come from Prince Edward Island in Canada (P. c. carbo), where 11 males averaged 3.68 kg (8 lb 2 oz) and 11 females averaged 2.94 kg (6 lb 7 1/2 oz). Length can vary from 70 to 102 cm (27 1/2 to 40 in) and wingspan from 121 to 160 cm (47 1/2 to 63 in). They are tied as the second largest extant species of cormorant after the flightless cormorant, with the Japanese cormorant averaging at a similar size. In bulk if not in linear dimensions, the blue-eyed shag species complex of the Southern Oceans is only marginally smaller on average.

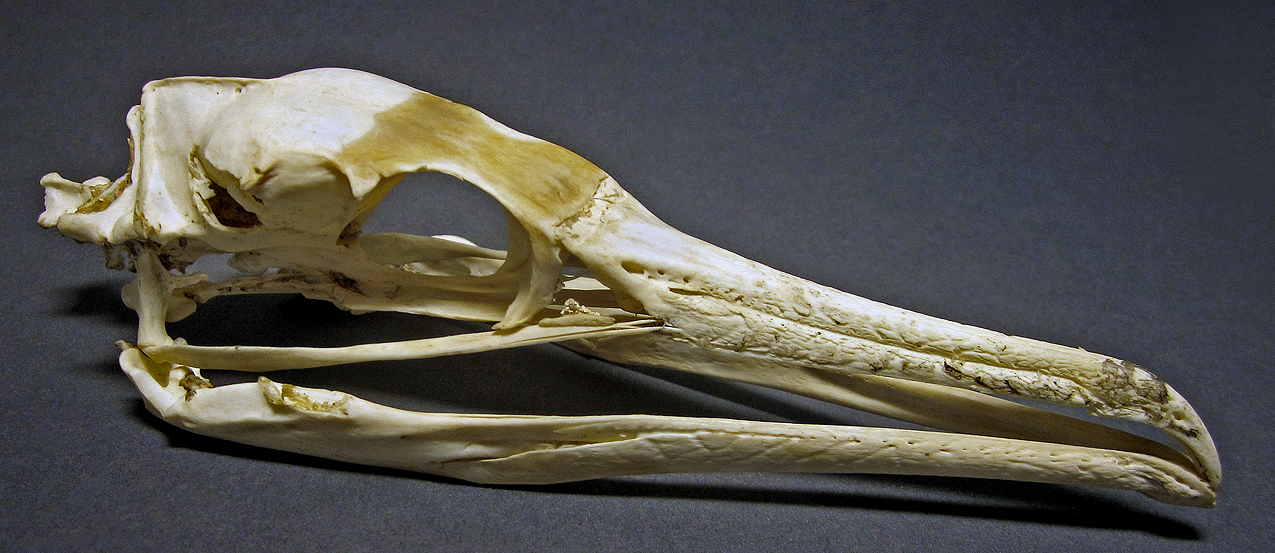
Skull

The plumage is largely black, but with bronze to greenish iridescence on the wings and tail, and purple iridescence on the body. The eyes are a striking deep sea-green in adults, duller dark grey in juveniles. The tail is fairly long, with 14 feathers. The bill is stout, and strongly hooked at the tip, dark grey at the tip, grading to paler at the base; it also has a yellow, or sometimes red, patch of bare gular skin on the throat at the base of the bill. The legs are short but stout, and dark grey; the feet large, and fully webbed between all four toes (totipalmate). In the breeding season, adults have white filoplume patches on the thighs and on the head and upper neck. The two African subspecies P. c. maroccanus and P. c. lucidus also have more extensive white plumage on the foreneck and breast. In winter, the plumage is more uniformly black, slightly duller and less glossy, and the white filoplumes are shed. Juveniles and immatures have pale to whitish underparts, becoming browner in their second year and reaching adult plumage when 3–4 years old. Great cormorants are mostly silent, but they make various guttural noises at their breeding colonies.

In European waters the great cormorant can be distinguished from the European shag by its larger size, heavier build, thicker bill, lack of a crest and body plumage with a purple, not green, tinge. In eastern North America, it is similarly larger and bulkier than the double-crested cormorant; the latter species also has more yellow on the throat and bill and lacks the white thigh patches seen on breeding plumage adult great cormorants. Both European shag and double-crested cormorant also differ in having 12, not 14, tail feathers. Identification between the great cormorant subspecies is difficult, and complicated by hybridisation between the subspecies; the most useful character is the shape of the gular skin patch, which forms an acute angle in nominate P. c. carbo, and an obtuse angle in P. c. sinensis; similar variation is used to distinguish P. c. hanedae and P. capillatus in eastern Asia. Differentiation between the two white-breasted African subspecies remains complex and uncertain.

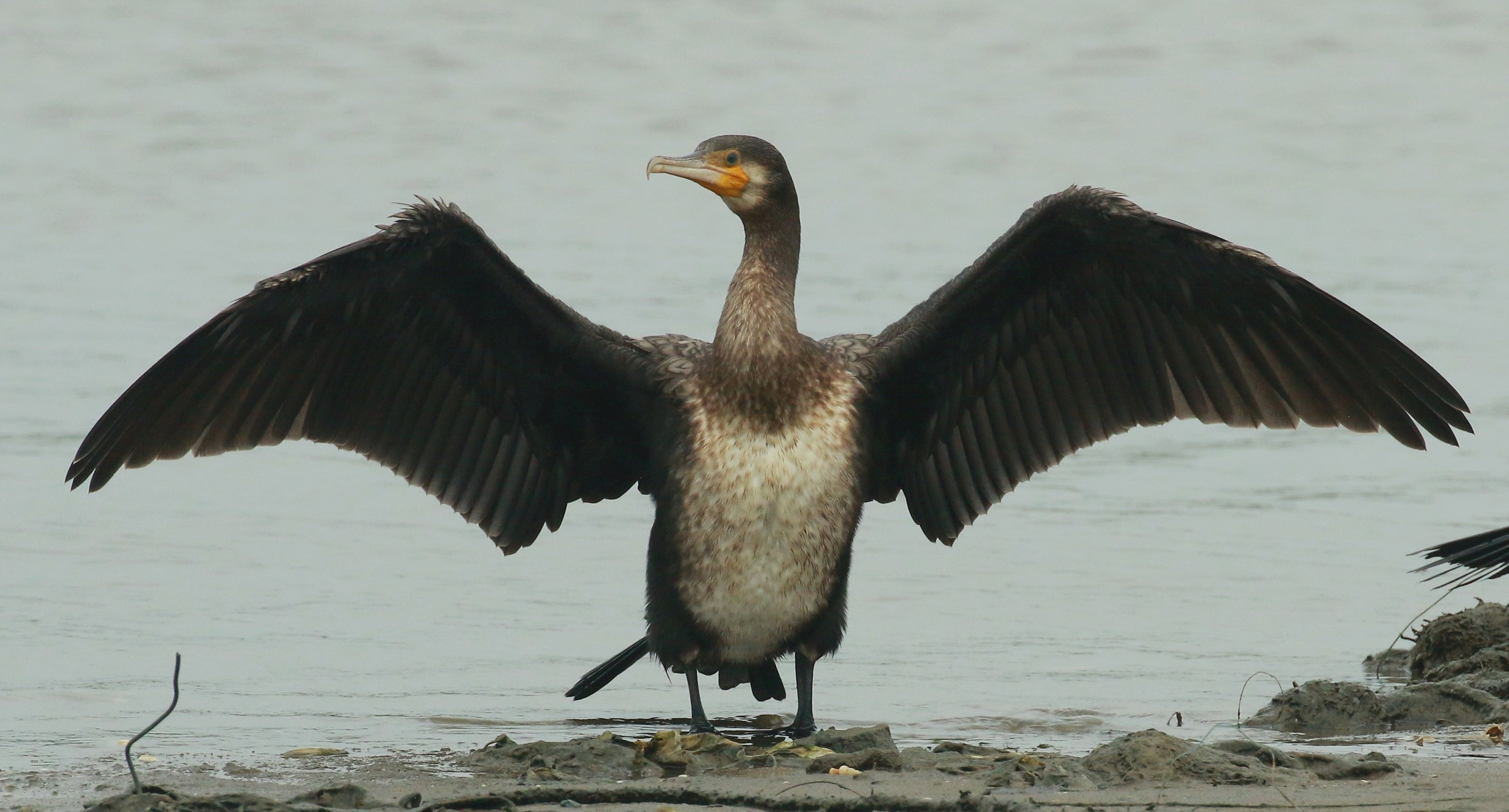
At Ponnani, Malappuram, Kerala, India

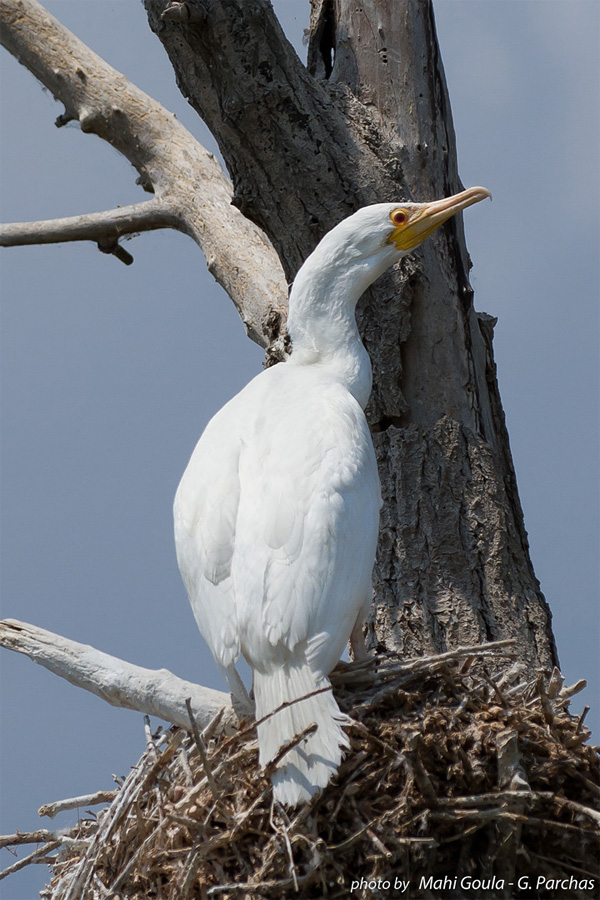
Albino at Lake Kerkini, Greece

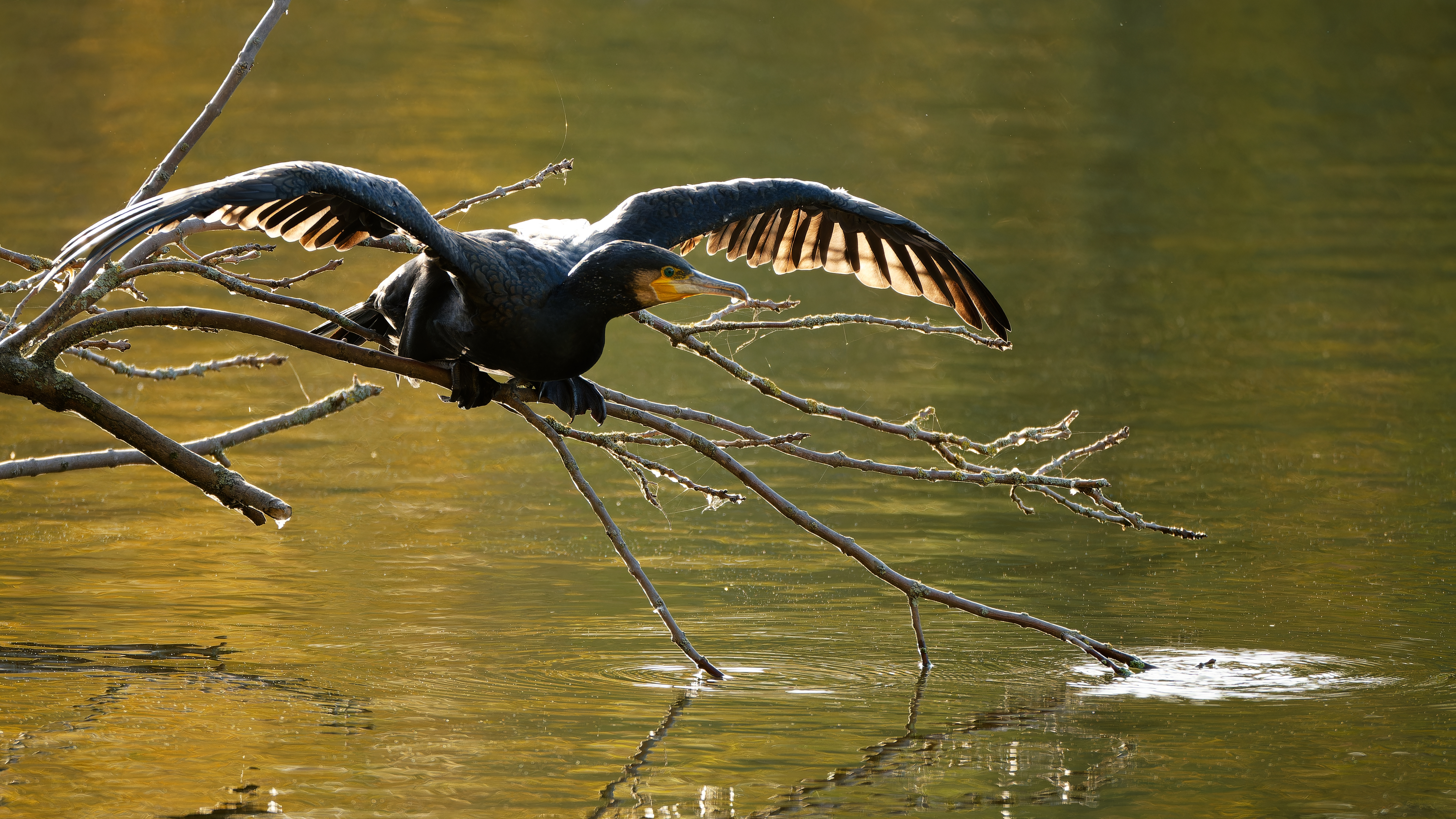
Great cormorant about to take off in Berlin, Germany

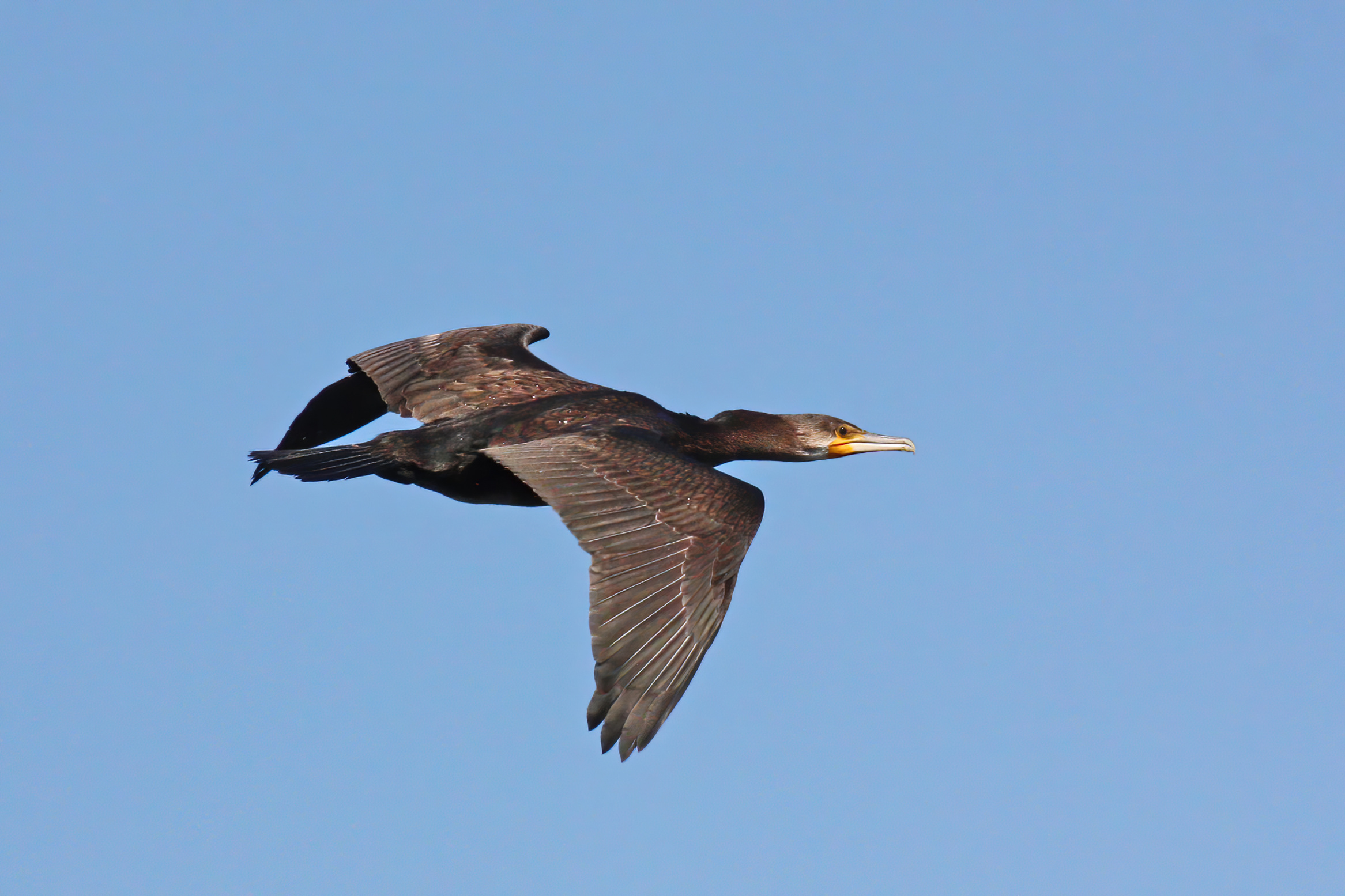
In flight, Farmoor Reservoir, Oxfordshire

Adut great cormorant (P. carbo) perched alongside Indian cormorants (P. fuscicollis), Maharashtra, India

=== Variation ===
The white filoplumes on the head in the breeding season vary with both the age of the bird, and the subspecies; older birds have more white filoplumes than younger birds, while nominate P. c. carbo tends to have fewer than P. c. sinensis, but there is much overlap. The extent of variation between individuals means it is not a very useful character for subspecies identification.

== Distribution ==
This is a very common and widespread bird species. It feeds at sea in inshore waters, in estuaries, and on freshwater lakes and rivers. Northern birds migrate south to escape waters that freeze in winter, moving to any coast or freshwater that is unfrozen and well-supplied with fish; in warmer areas, birds disperse locally. They only rarely cross larger bodies of water such as the North Sea.

The type subspecies, P. c. carbo, is found mainly in Atlantic waters and nearby inland areas, on northwestern European coasts, the Faroe Islands, Iceland and Greenland, and on the northeastern seaboard of North America. The widespread continental subspecies P. c. sinensis occurs on most of mainland Europe and east across the Palearctic to Siberia and southeastern Asia. The subspecies P. c. novaehollandiae is found in Australian and New Zealand waters.

== Behaviour ==
=== Breeding ===
The great cormorant nests in colonies near wetlands, rivers, and sheltered inshore waters. Pairs will use the same nest site to breed year after year. It builds its nest, which is made from sticks, in trees, on the ledges of cliffs, and on the ground on rocky islands that are free of predators. They lay a clutch of three to five eggs that measure 63 by 41 millimetres (2 1/2 by 1 5/8 in) on average. The eggs are a pale blue or green, and sometimes have a white chalky layer covering them. These eggs are incubated for a period of about 28 to 31 days.

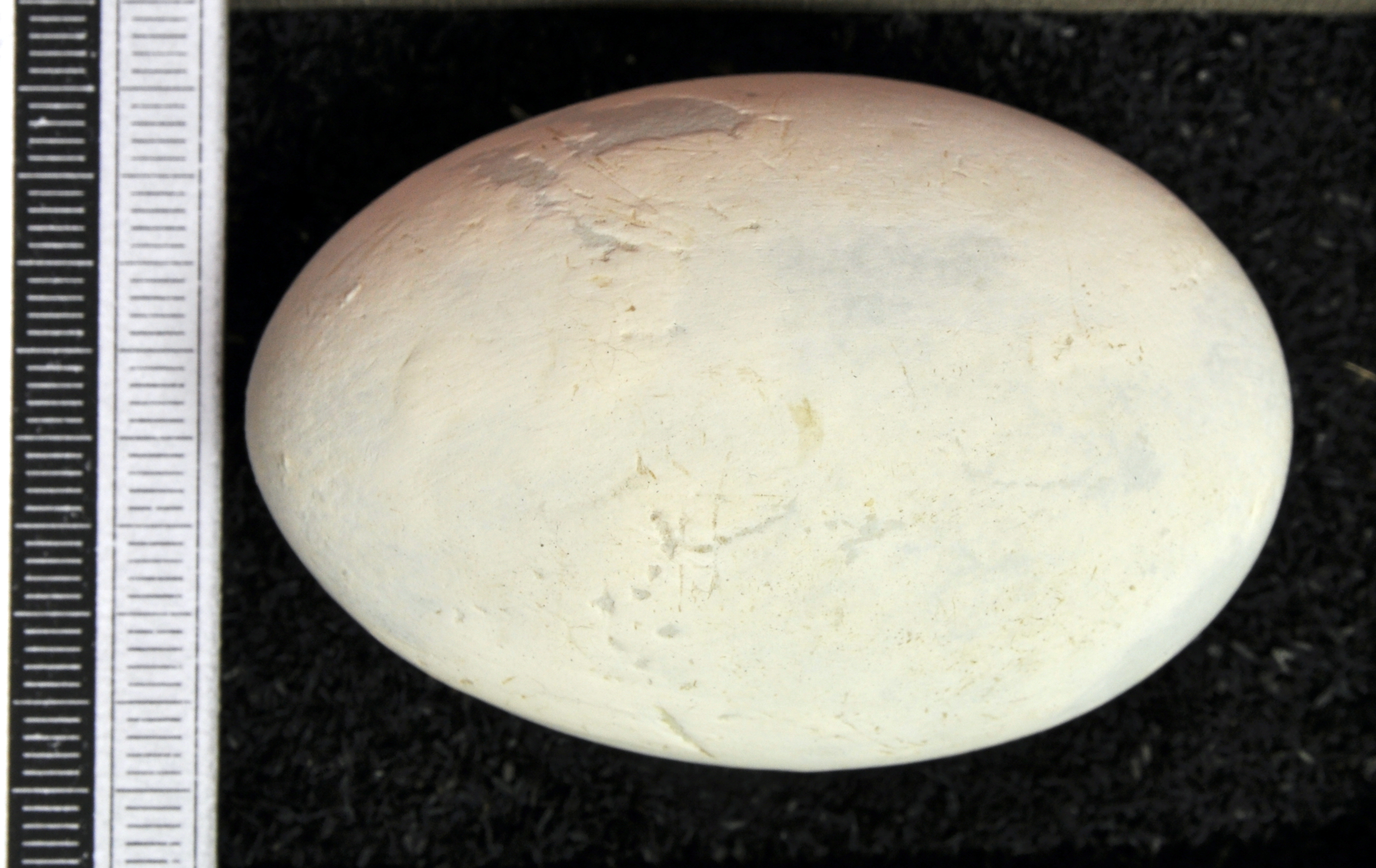
Egg, Collection Museum Wiesbaden

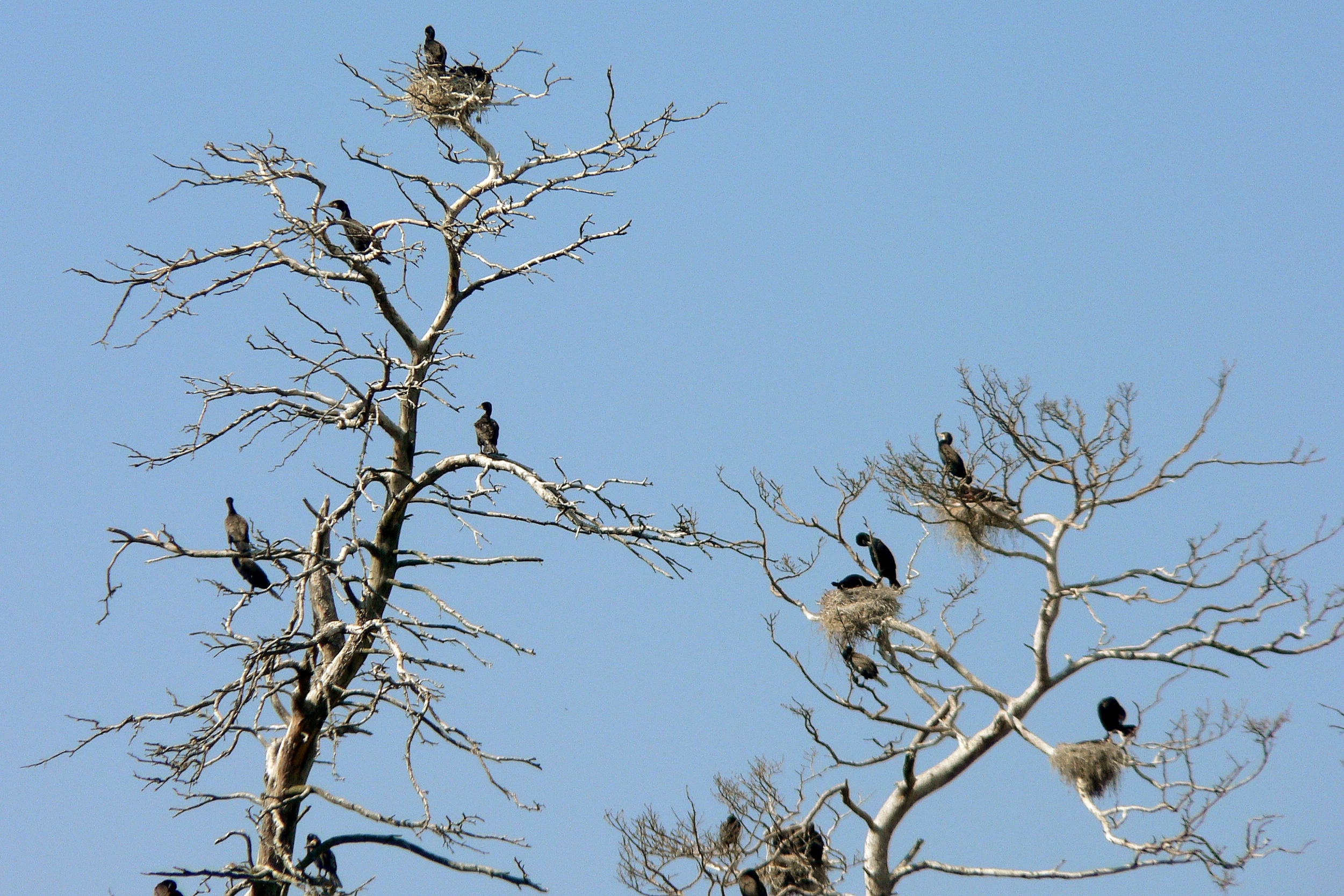
Colony in Juodkrantė, Lithuania, and damage to the trees in which they are nesting

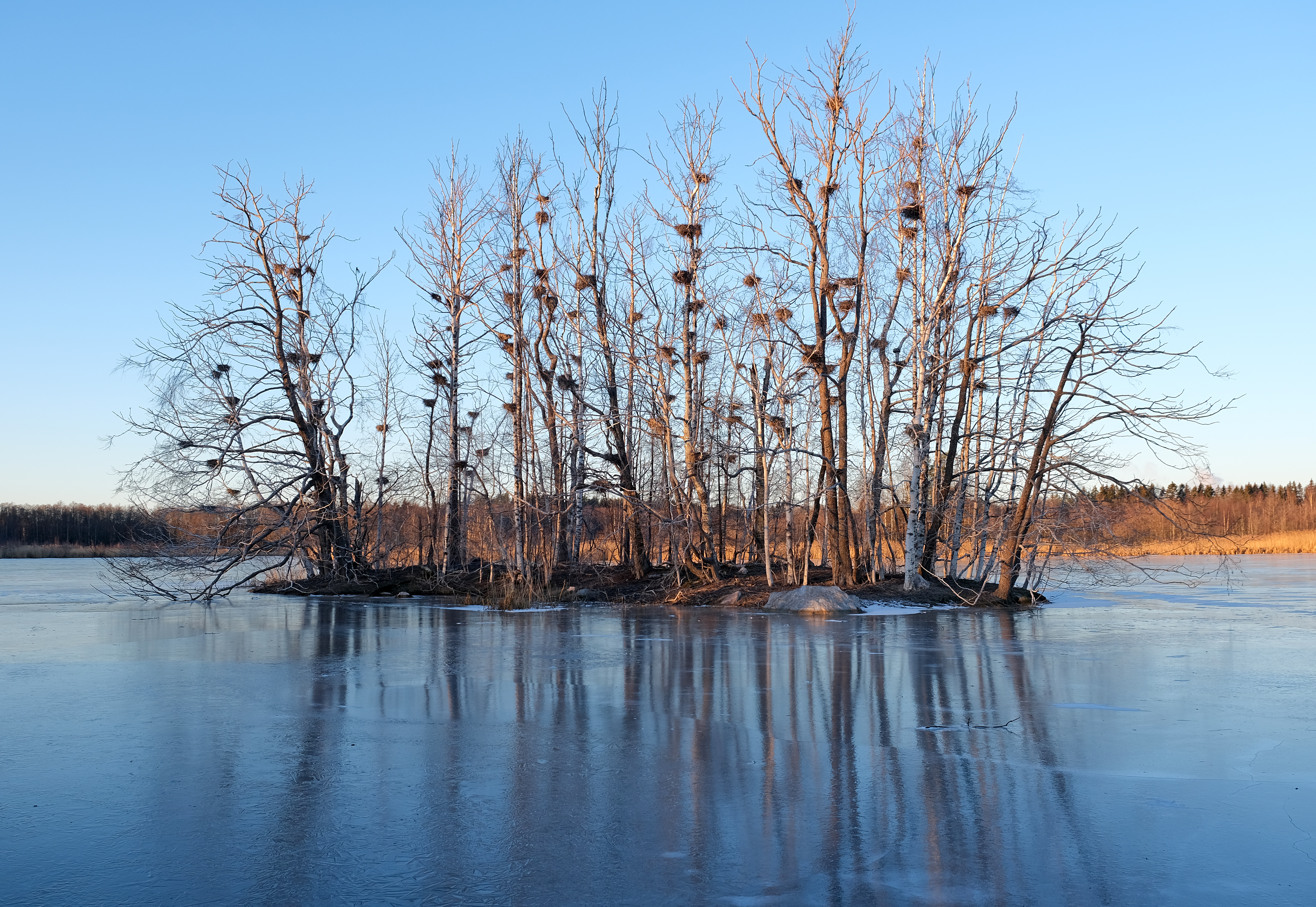
Colony in Finland

=== Food and feeding ===
The great cormorant feeds on fish caught through diving. Birds at the Chausey Islands feed primarily on wrasses, but also takes sand smelt, flathead and common soles. The average weight of fish taken by great cormorants increases with decreasing air and water temperature. Cormorants consume all fish of appropriate size that they are able to catch in summer and noticeably select for larger, mostly torpedo-shaped fish in winter. In winter, the foraging efficiency described for cormorants by various researchers is increased by capturing larger fish, not due to capturing more fish. In some freshwater systems, the take of fish by overwintering great cormorants was estimated to be up to 80 kg per ha per year (e.g. Vltava River, Czech Republic).

It forages by foot-propelled diving and capturing its prey in its beak. The duration of its dives varies from 1–3 minutes, with the bird diving to depths of up to a maximum of 9.5 metres (31 ft). About 60% of dives are to the benthic zone and about 10% are to the pelagic zone, with the rest of the dives being to zones in between the two. Studies suggest that their hearing has evolved for underwater usage, possibly aiding their detection of fish. These adaptations also have a cost on their hearing ability in air which is of lowered sensitivity.

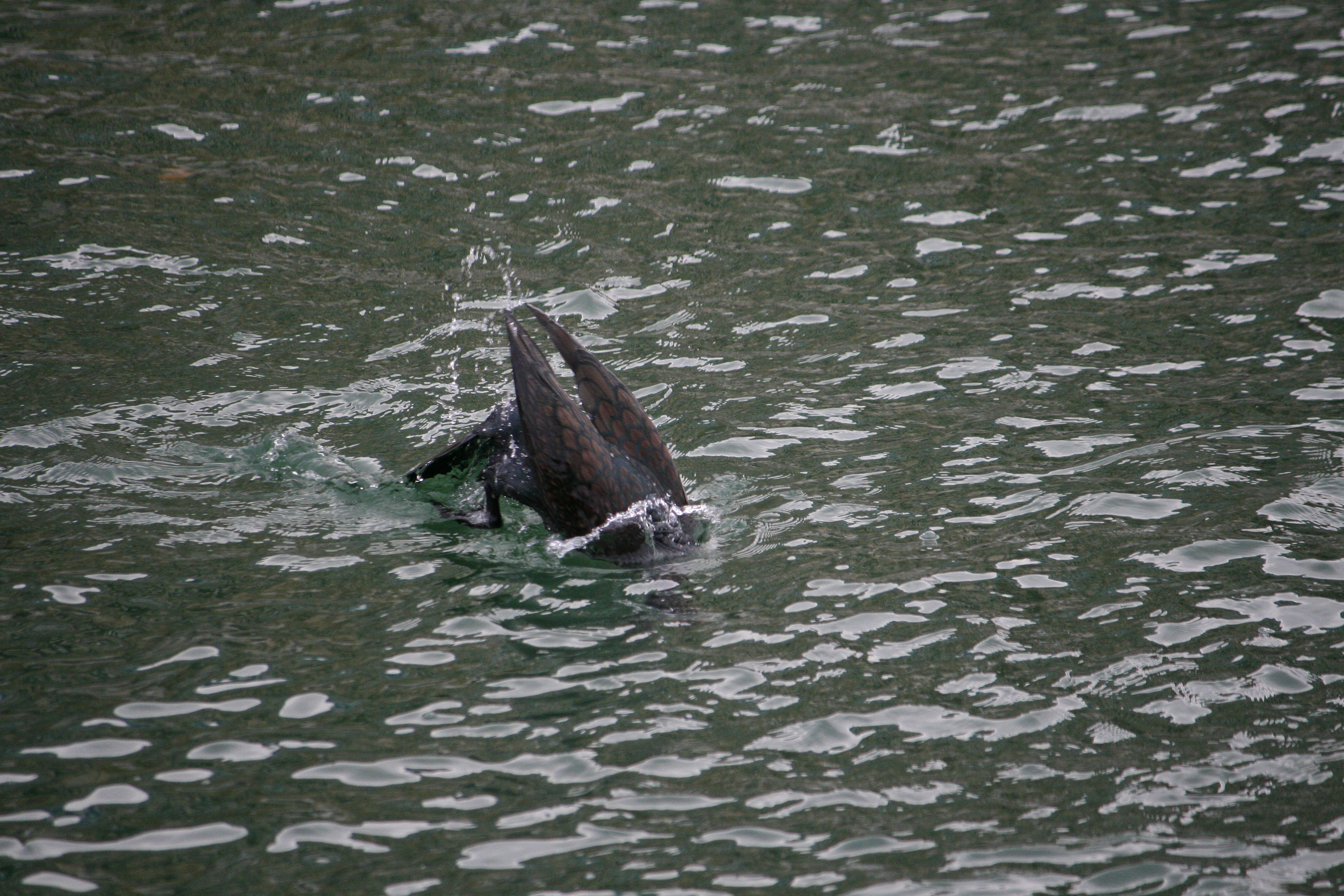
Diving in Dambovita River, Bucharest

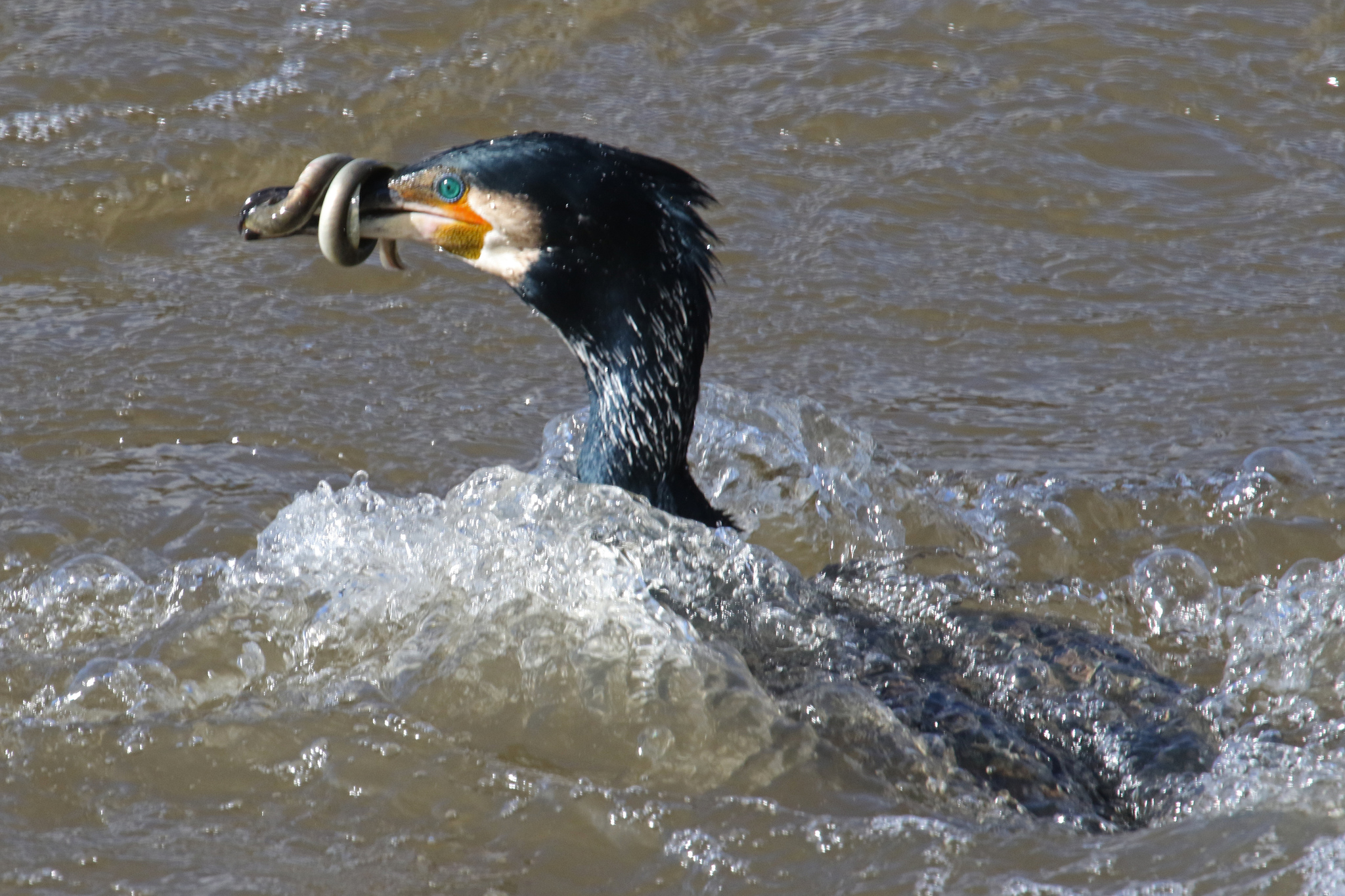
With a European eel, in England

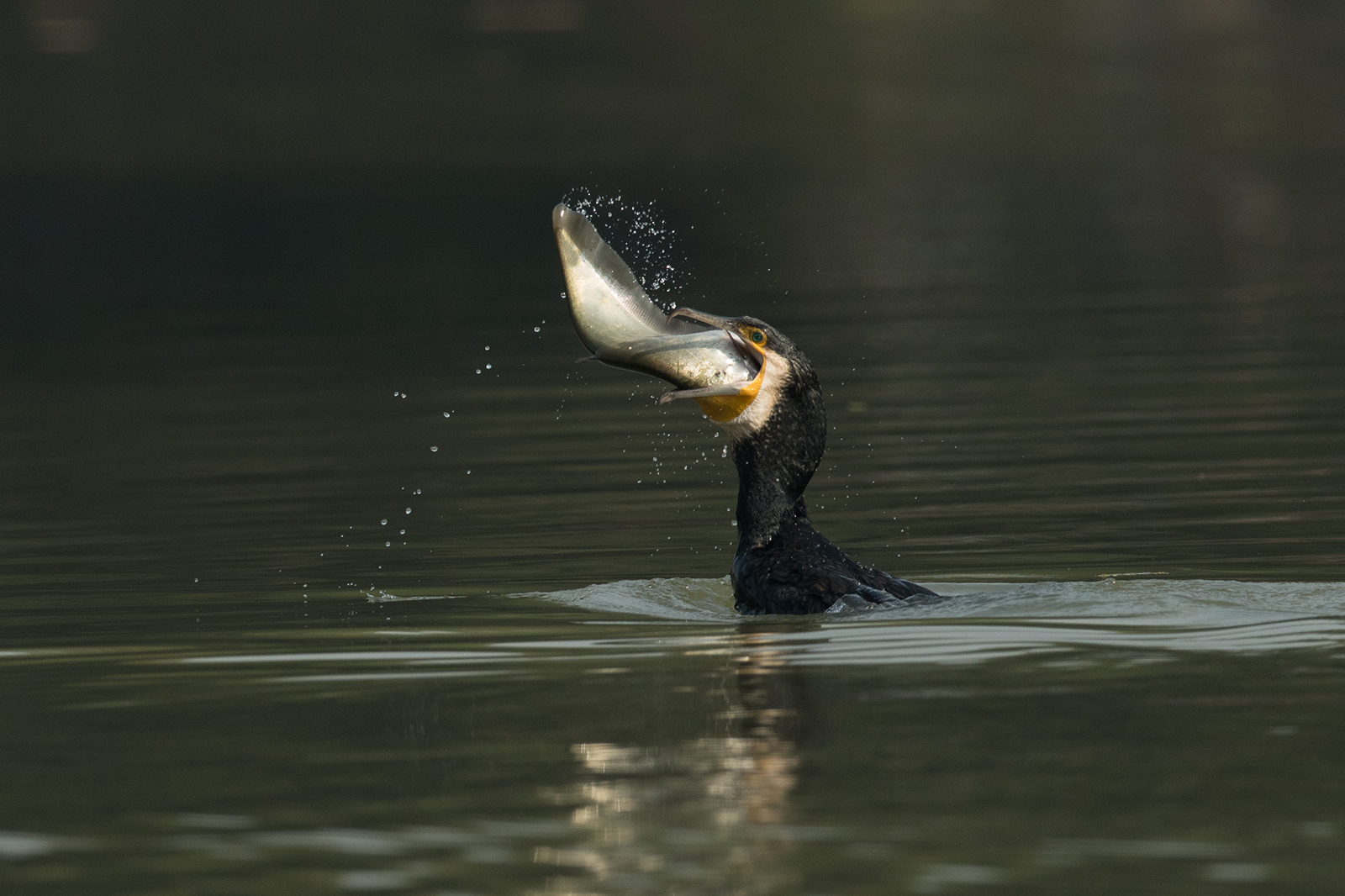
Swallowing a bronze featherback at Keoladeo Ghana National Park, Bharatpur

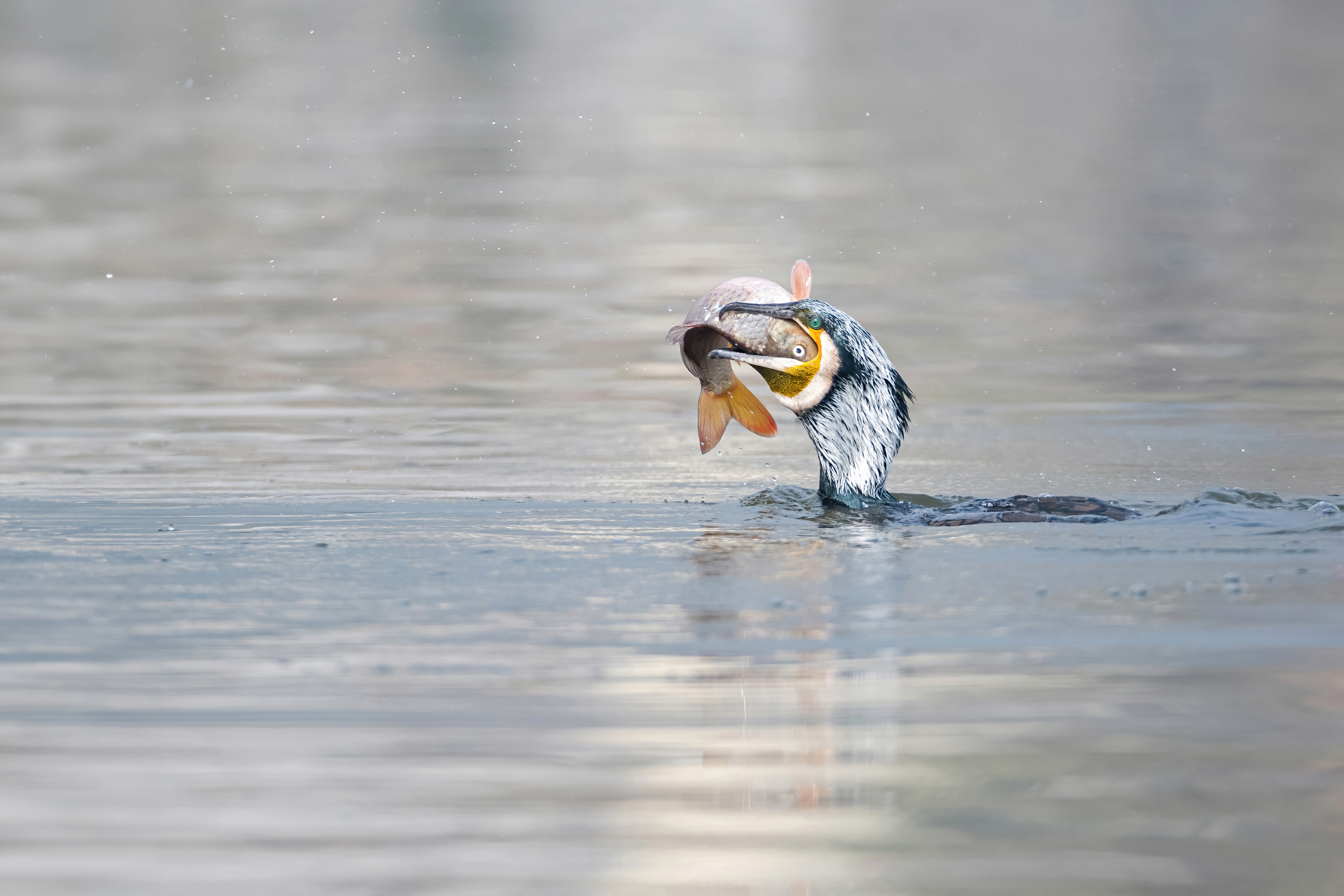
Eating a carp, in Taudaha Lake, Nepal

== Disease ==
Like many other colonial-breeding birds, great cormorant is vulnerable to the highly pathogenic avian influenza (HPAI) outbreaks, with mass mortality in numerous colonies in the Baltic Sea (where over 1,700 died in 2021–2022) and elsewhere.

== Relationships with humans ==
Many fishermen see in the great cormorant a competitor for fish. Because of this, it was hunted nearly to extinction in the past. Due to conservation efforts, its numbers increased. At the moment, there are about 1.2 million birds in Europe (based on winter counts; late summer counts would show higher numbers). Increasing populations have once again brought the cormorant into conflict with fisheries. For example, in Britain, where inland breeding was once uncommon, there are now increasing numbers of birds breeding inland, and many inland fish farms and fisheries now claim to be suffering high losses due to these birds. In the UK each year, some licences are issued to cull specified numbers of cormorants in order to help reduce predation; it is, however, still illegal to kill a bird without such a licence.

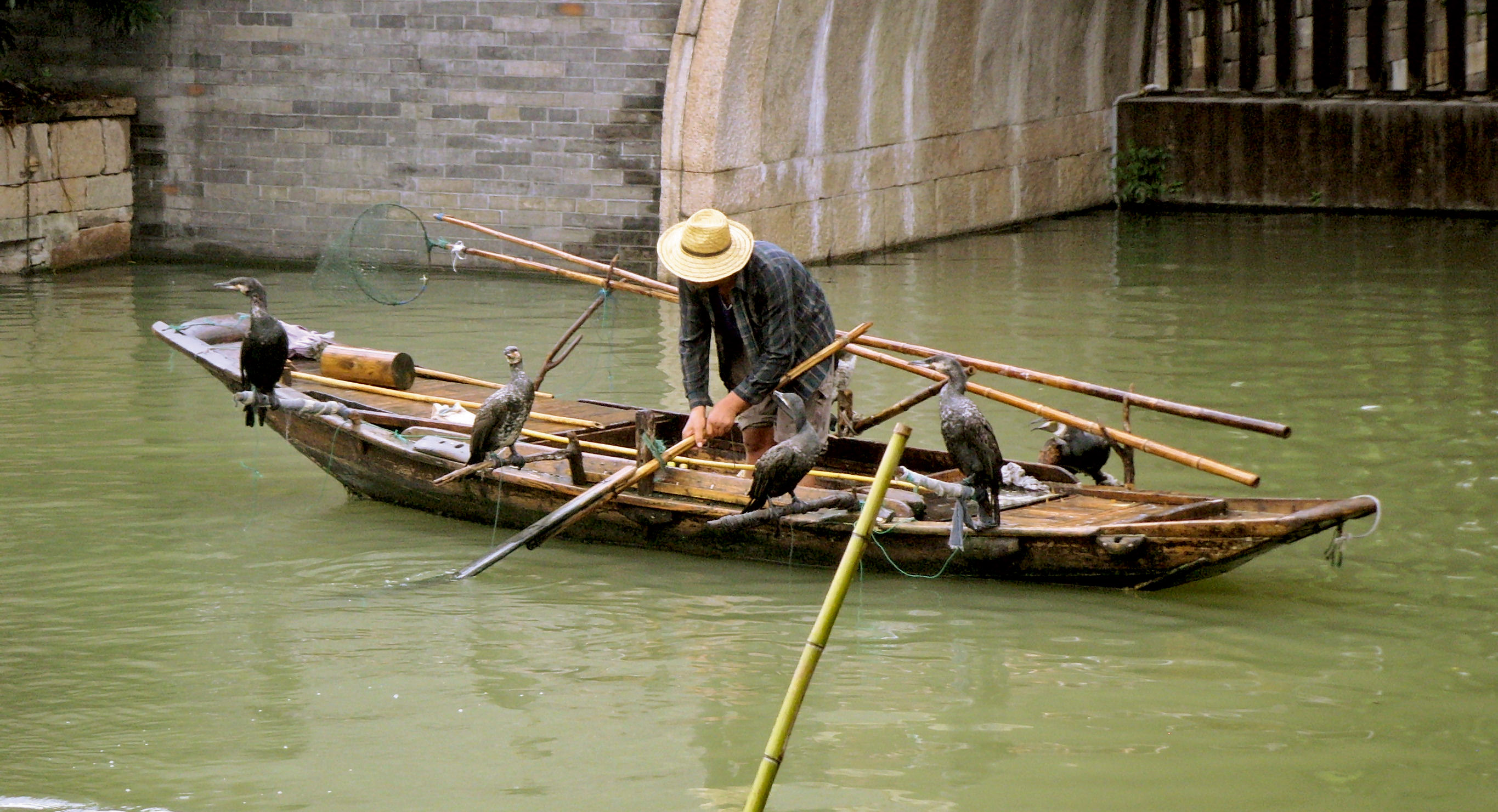
Cormorant fishing in Wuzhen Xizha, Zhejiang, China

Cormorant fishing is practised in China, Japan, and elsewhere around the globe. In this practice, fishermen tie a line around the throats of cormorants, tight enough to prevent swallowing the larger fish they catch, and deploy them from small boats. The cormorants catch fish without being able to fully swallow them, and the fishermen are able to retrieve the fish simply by forcing open the cormorants' mouths, apparently engaging the regurgitation reflex. To encourage its cooperation, the fisherman would reward the cormorant by letting it keep every eighth fish. The cormorants would eventually recognise this pattern and refuse to perform the eighth dive unless the fishing line was untied, and if the reward fish was not provided it would refuse to dive altogether.

In Norway, the cormorant is a traditional game bird. Each year approximately 10,000 cormorants are shot to be eaten. In North Norway, cormorants are traditionally seen as semi-sacred. It is regarded as good luck to have cormorants gather near your village or settlement. An old legend states that people who die far out at sea, whose bodies are never recovered, spend eternity on the island Utrøst – which can only occasionally be found by mortals. The inhabitants of Utrøst can only visit their homes in the shape of cormorants.

== Videos ==
Resting on a post in a port in Den Oever, the Netherlands

Stretching wings while sitting on a pole

Great cormorant hunting in Odessa

Great cormorant, drying wings at Lake Juniko (十二湖) in Aomori, Japan

Adult great cormorant in breeding plumage, Texel, Netherlands (2010)
